= Human embryonic development =

Development and formation of the human embryo

The initial stages of human embryonic development (embryogenesis)

Human embryonic development or human embryogenesis is the development and formation of the human embryo. It is characterised by the processes of cell division and cellular differentiation of the embryo that occurs during the early stages of development. In biological terms, the development of the human body entails growth from a one-celled zygote to an adult human being. Fertilization occurs when the sperm cell successfully enters and fuses with an egg cell (ovum). The genetic material of the sperm and egg then combine to form the single cell zygote and the germinal stage of development commences. Human embryonic development covers the first eight weeks of development, which have 23 stages, called Carnegie stages. At the beginning of the ninth week, the embryo is termed a fetus (spelled "foetus" in British English). In comparison to the embryo, the fetus has more recognizable external features and a more complete set of developing organs.

Human embryology is the study of this development during the first eight weeks after fertilization. The normal period of gestation (pregnancy) is about nine months or 40 weeks.

The germinal stage refers to the time from fertilization through the development of the early embryo until implantation is completed in the uterus. The germinal stage takes around 10 days. During this stage, the zygote divides in a process called cleavage. A blastocyst is then formed and implants in the uterus. Embryogenesis continues with the next stage of gastrulation, when the three germ layers of the embryo are formed. The processes of histogenesis, neurulation, and organogenesis follow.

The entire process of embryogenesis involves coordinated spatial and temporal changes in gene expression, cell growth, and cellular differentiation. A nearly identical process occurs in other species, especially among chordates.

== Germinal stage ==
=== Fertilization ===
Fertilization takes place when the spermatozoon has successfully entered the ovum and the two sets of genetic material carried by the gametes fuse together, resulting in the zygote (a single diploid cell). This usually takes place in the ampulla of one of the fallopian tubes. The zygote contains the combined genetic material carried by both the male and female gametes which consists of the 23 chromosomes from the nucleus of the ovum and the 23 chromosomes from the nucleus of the sperm. The 46 chromosomes undergo changes prior to the mitotic division which leads to the formation of the embryo having two cells.

Successful fertilization is enabled by three processes, which also act as controls to ensure species-specificity. The first is that of chemotaxis which directs the movement of the sperm towards the ovum. Secondly, an adhesive compatibility between the sperm and the egg occurs. With the sperm adhered to the ovum, the third process of acrosomal reaction takes place; the front part of the spermatozoan head is capped by an acrosome which contains digestive enzymes to break down the zona pellucida and allow its entry. The entry of the sperm causes calcium to be released which blocks entry to other sperm cells. A parallel reaction takes place in the ovum called the zona reaction. This sees the release of cortical granules that release enzymes which digest sperm receptor proteins, thus preventing polyspermy. The granules also fuse with the plasma membrane and modify the zona pellucida in such a way as to prevent further sperm entry.

=== Cleavage ===
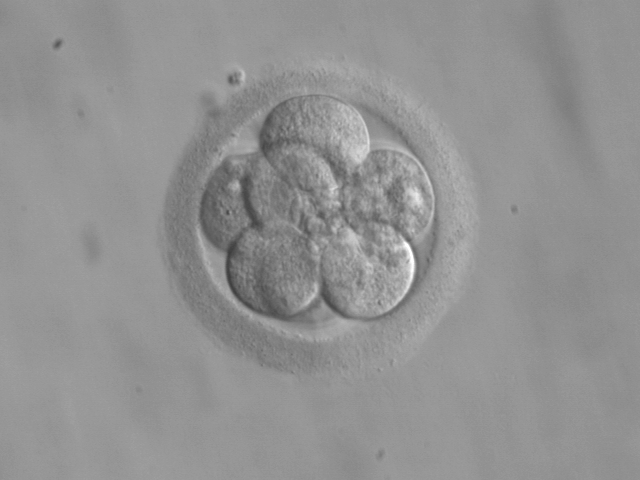
Eight-cell embryo, at three days

The beginning of the cleavage process is marked when the zygote divides through mitosis into two cells. This mitosis continues and the first two cells divide into four cells, then into eight cells and so on. Each division takes from 12 to 24 hours. The zygote is large compared to any other cell and undergoes cleavage without any overall increase in size. This means that with each successive subdivision, the ratio of nuclear to cytoplasmic material increases.

Initially, the dividing cells, called blastomeres (blastos Greek for sprout), are undifferentiated and aggregated into a sphere enclosed within the zona pellucida of the ovum. When eight blastomeres have formed, they start to compact. They begin to develop gap junctions, enabling them to develop in an integrated way and co-ordinate their response to physiological signals and environmental cues.

When the cells number around sixteen, the solid sphere of cells within the zona pellucida is referred to as a morula.

=== Blastulation ===
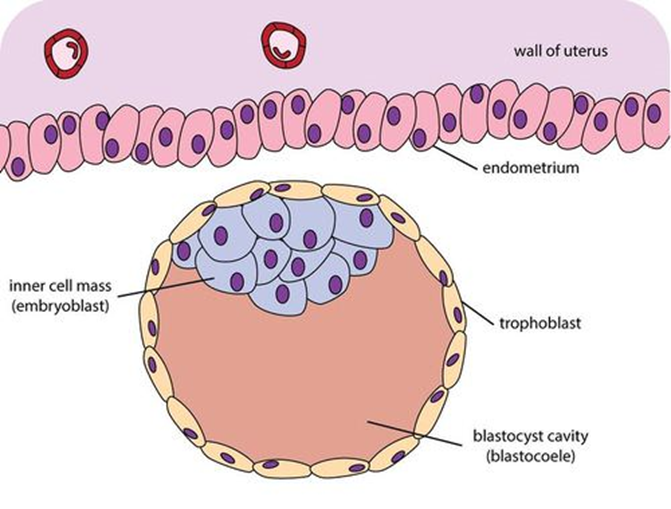
Blastocyst with an inner cell mass and trophoblast

Cleavage itself is the first stage in blastulation, the process of forming the blastocyst. Cells differentiate into an outer layer of cells called the trophoblast, and an inner cell mass. With further compaction the individual outer blastomeres, the trophoblasts, become indistinguishable. They are still enclosed within the zona pellucida. This compaction serves to make the structure watertight, containing the fluid that the cells will later secrete. The inner mass of cells differentiate to become embryoblasts and polarise at one end. They close together and form gap junctions, which facilitate cellular communication. This polarisation leaves a cavity, the blastocoel, creating a structure that is now termed the blastocyst. (In animals other than mammals, this is called the blastula).

The trophoblasts secrete fluid into the blastocoel. The resulting increase in size of the blastocyst causes it to hatch through the zona pellucida, which then disintegrates. This process is called zona hatching and it takes place on the sixth day of embryo development, immediately before the implantation process. The hatching of the human embryo is supported by proteases secreted by the cells of the blastocyst, which digest proteins of the zona pellucida, giving rise to a hole. Then, due to the rhythmic expansion and contractions of the blastocyst, an increase of the pressure inside the blastocyst itself occurs, the hole expands and finally the blastocyst can emerge from this rigid envelope.

The inner cell mass will give rise to the pre-embryo, the amnion, yolk sac and allantois, while the fetal part of the placenta will form from the outer trophoblast layer. The embryo plus its membranes is called the conceptus, and by this stage the conceptus has reached the uterus. The zona pellucida ultimately disappears completely, and the now exposed cells of the trophoblast allow the blastocyst to attach itself to the endometrium, where it will implant. The formation of the hypoblast and epiblast, which are the two main layers of the bilaminar germ disc, occurs at the beginning of the second week. Both the embryoblast and the trophoblast will turn into two sub-layers. The inner cells will turn into the hypoblast layer, which will surround the other layer, called the epiblast, and these layers will form the embryonic disc that will develop into the embryo.

The trophoblast will also develop two sub-layers: the cytotrophoblast, which is in front of the syncytiotrophoblast, which in turn lies within the endometrium. Next, another layer called the exocoelomic membrane or Heuser's membrane will appear and surround the cytotrophoblast, as well as the primitive yolk sac. The syncytiotrophoblast will grow and will enter a phase called lacunar stage, in which some vacuoles will appear and be filled by blood in the following days. The development of the yolk sac starts with the hypoblastic flat cells that form the exocoelomic membrane, which will coat the inner part of the cytotrophoblast to form the primitive yolk sac. An erosion of the endothelial lining of the maternal capillaries by the syncytiotrophoblastic cells results in the formation of the maternal sinusoids from where the blood will begin to penetrate and flow into and through the trophoblastic lacunae to give rise to the uteroplacental circulation. Subsequently, new cells derived from yolk sac will be established between trophoblast and exocoelomic membrane and will give rise to extra-embryonic mesoderm, which will form the chorionic cavity.

At the end of the second week of development, some cells of the trophoblast penetrate and form rounded columns into the syncytiotrophoblast. These columns are known as primary villi. At the same time, other migrating cells form into the exocoelomic cavity a new cavity named the secondary or definitive yolk sac, smaller than the primitive yolk sac.

=== Implantation ===
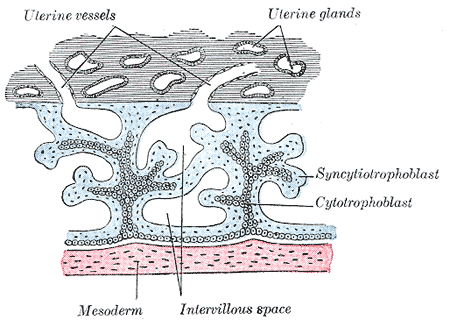
Trophoblast differentiation

After ovulation, the endometrial lining becomes transformed into a secretory lining in preparation of accepting the embryo. It becomes thickened, with its secretory glands becoming elongated, and is increasingly vascular. This lining of the uterine cavity (or womb) is now known as the decidua, and it produces a great number of large decidual cells in its increased interglandular tissue. The blastomeres in the blastocyst are arranged into an outer layer called the trophoblast. The trophoblast then differentiates into an inner layer, the cytotrophoblast, and an outer layer, the syncytiotrophoblast. The cytotrophoblast contains cuboidal epithelial cells and is the source of dividing cells, and the syncytiotrophoblast is a syncytial layer without cell boundaries.

The syncytiotrophoblast implants the blastocyst in the decidual epithelium by projections of chorionic villi, forming the embryonic part of the placenta. The placenta develops once the blastocyst is implanted, connecting the embryo to the uterine wall. The decidua here is termed the decidua basalis; it lies between the blastocyst and the myometrium and forms the maternal part of the placenta. The implantation is assisted by hydrolytic enzymes that erode the epithelium. The syncytiotrophoblast also produces human chorionic gonadotropin, a hormone that stimulates the release of progesterone from the corpus luteum. Progesterone enriches the uterus with a thick lining of blood vessels and capillaries so that it can oxygenate and sustain the developing embryo. The uterus liberates sugar from stored glycogen from its cells to nourish the embryo. The villi begin to branch and contain blood vessels of the embryo. Other villi, called terminal or free villi, exchange nutrients. The embryo is joined to the trophoblastic shell by a narrow connecting stalk that develops into the umbilical cord to attach the placenta to the embryo. Arteries in the decidua are remodelled to increase the maternal blood flow into the intervillous spaces of the placenta, allowing gas exchange and the transfer of nutrients to the embryo. Waste products from the embryo will diffuse across the placenta.

As the syncytiotrophoblast starts to penetrate the uterine wall, the inner cell mass (embryoblast) also develops. The inner cell mass is the source of embryonic stem cells, which are pluripotent and can develop into any one of the three germ layer cells, and which have the potency to give rise to all the tissues and organs.

=== Embryonic disc ===
The embryoblast forms an embryonic disc of two layers, the upper layer is called the epiblast and the lower layer, the hypoblast. The disc is stretched between what will become the amniotic cavity and the yolk sac. The epiblast is adjacent to the trophoblast and made of columnar cells; the hypoblast is closest to the blastocyst cavity and made of cuboidal cells. The epiblast migrates away from the trophoblast downwards, forming the amniotic cavity, the lining of which is formed from amnioblasts developed from the epiblast. The hypoblast is pushed down and forms the yolk sac (exocoelomic cavity) lining. Some hypoblast cells migrate along the inner cytotrophoblast lining of the blastocoel, secreting an extracellular matrix along the way. These hypoblast cells and extracellular matrix are called Heuser's membrane (or the exocoelomic membrane), and they cover the blastocoel to form the yolk sac (or exocoelomic cavity). Cells of the hypoblast migrate along the outer edges of this reticulum and form the extraembryonic mesoderm; this disrupts the extraembryonic reticulum. Soon pockets form in the reticulum, which ultimately coalesce to form the chorionic cavity (extraembryonic coelom).

== Gastrulation ==
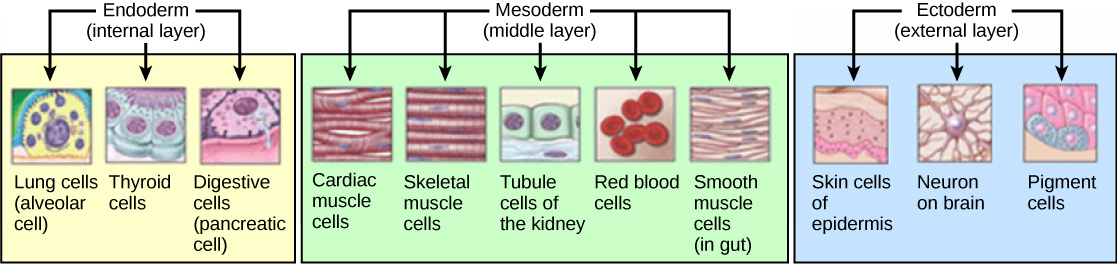
Histogenesis of the three germ layers

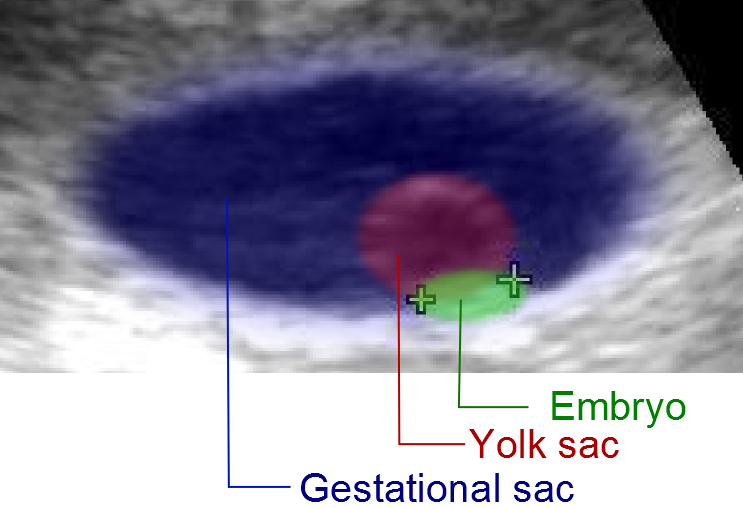
Artificially colored – gestational sac, yolk sac and embryo (measuring 3 mm at five weeks)

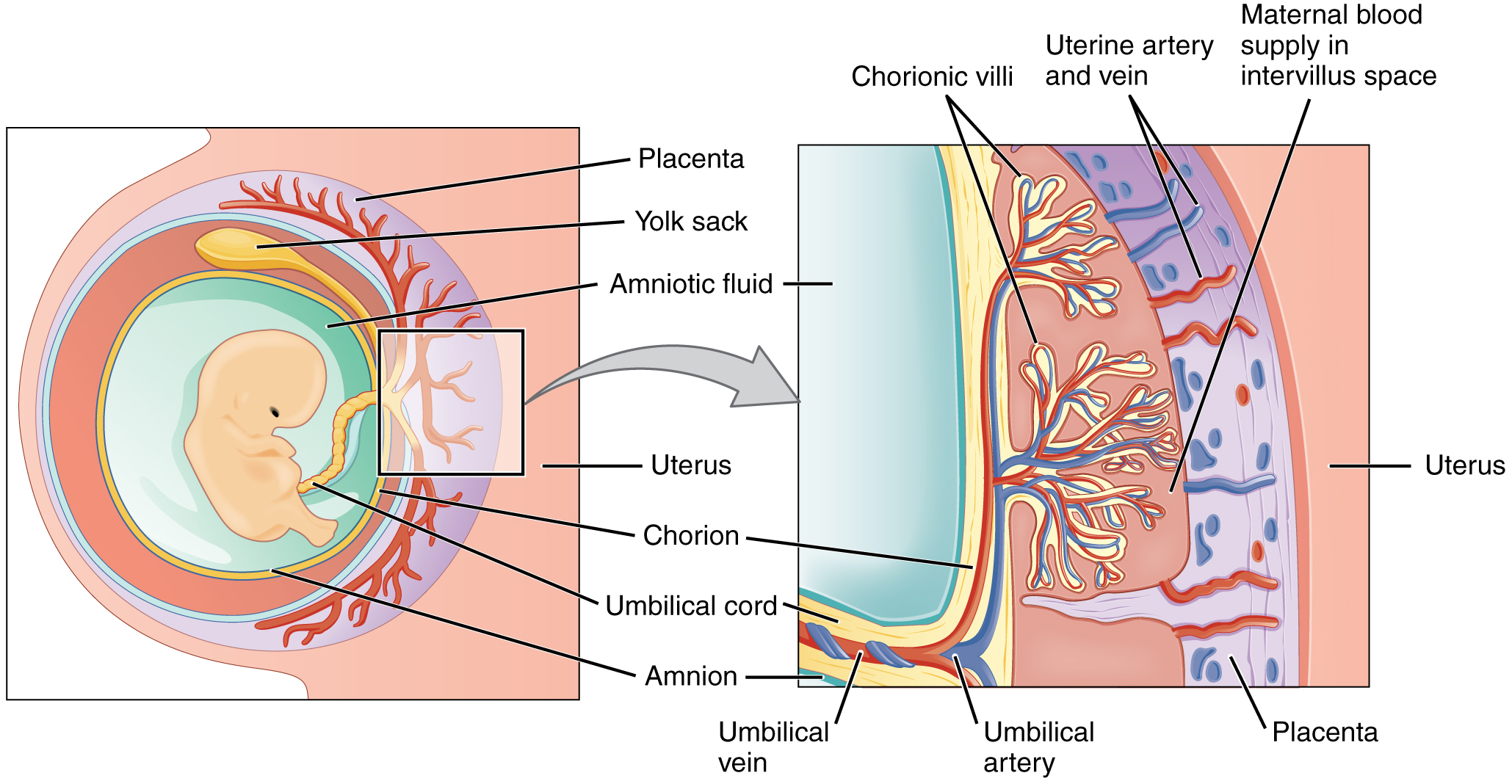
Embryo attached to placenta in amniotic cavity

The primitive streak, a linear collection of cells formed by the migrating epiblast, appears, and this marks the beginning of gastrulation, which takes place around the seventeenth day (week 3) after fertilization. The process of gastrulation reorganises the two-layer embryo into a three-layer embryo, and also gives the embryo its specific head-to-tail, and front-to-back orientation, by way of the primitive streak which establishes bilateral symmetry. A primitive node (or primitive knot) forms in front of the primitive streak which is the organiser of neurulation. A primitive pit forms as a depression in the centre of the primitive node which connects to the notochord which lies directly underneath. The node has arisen from epiblasts of the amniotic cavity floor, and it is this node that induces the formation of the neural plate which serves as the basis for the nervous system.

The neural plate will form opposite the primitive streak from ectodermal tissue which thickens and flattens into the neural plate. The epiblast in that region moves down into the streak at the location of the primitive pit where the process called ingression, which leads to the formation of the mesoderm takes place. This ingression sees the cells from the epiblast move into the primitive streak in an epithelial-mesenchymal transition; epithelial cells become mesenchymal stem cells, multipotent stromal cells that can differentiate into various cell types. The hypoblast is pushed out of the way. The epiblast keeps moving and forms a second layer, the mesoderm. The epiblast has now differentiated into the three germ layers of the embryo, so that the bilaminar disc is now a trilaminar disc, the gastrula.

The three germ layers are the ectoderm, mesoderm and endoderm, and are formed as three overlapping flat discs. It is from these three layers that all the structures and organs of the body will be derived through the processes of somitogenesis, histogenesis and organogenesis. The embryonic endoderm is formed by invagination of epiblastic cells that migrate to the hypoblast, while the mesoderm is formed by the cells that develop between the epiblast and endoderm. In general, all germ layers will derive from the epiblast. The upper layer of ectoderm will give rise to the outermost layer of skin, central and peripheral nervous systems, eyes, inner ear, and many connective tissues. The middle layer of mesoderm will give rise to the heart and the beginning of the circulatory system as well as the bones, muscles and kidneys. The inner layer of endoderm will serve as the starting point for the development of the lungs, intestines, thyroid, pancreas and bladder.

Following ingression, a blastopore develops where the cells have ingressed, in one side of the embryo and it deepens to become the archenteron, the first formative stage of the gut. As in all deuterostomes, the blastopore becomes the anus whilst the gut tunnels through the embryo to the other side where the opening becomes the mouth. With a functioning digestive tube, gastrulation is now completed and the next stage of neurulation can begin.

== Neurulation ==
Neural plate

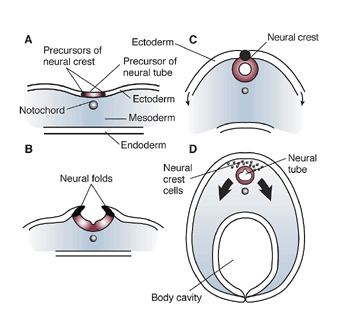
Neural tube development

Following gastrulation, the ectoderm gives rise to epithelial and neural tissue, and the gastrula is now referred to as the neurula. The neural plate that has formed as a thickened plate from the ectoderm, continues to broaden and its ends start to fold upwards as neural folds. Neurulation refers to this folding process whereby the neural plate is transformed into the neural tube, and this takes place during the fourth week. They fold, along a shallow neural groove which has formed as a dividing median line in the neural plate. This deepens as the folds continue to gain height, when they will meet and close together at the neural crest. The cells that migrate through the most cranial part of the primitive line form the paraxial mesoderm, which will give rise to the somitomeres that in the process of somitogenesis will differentiate into somites that will form the sclerotomes, the syndetomes, the myotomes and the dermatomes to form cartilage and bone, tendons, dermis (skin), and muscle. The intermediate mesoderm gives rise to the urogenital tract and consists of cells that migrate from the middle region of the primitive line. Other cells migrate through the caudal part of the primitive line and form the lateral mesoderm, and those cells migrating by the most caudal part contribute to the extraembryonic mesoderm.

The embryonic disc begins flat and round, but eventually elongates to have a wider cephalic part and narrow-shaped caudal end. At the beginning, the primitive line extends in cephalic direction and 18 days after fertilization returns caudally until it disappears. In the cephalic portion, the germ layer shows specific differentiation at the beginning of the fourth week, while in the caudal portion it occurs at the end of the fourth week. Cranial and caudal neuropores become progressively smaller until they close completely (by day 26) forming the neural tube.

== Development of organs and organ systems ==
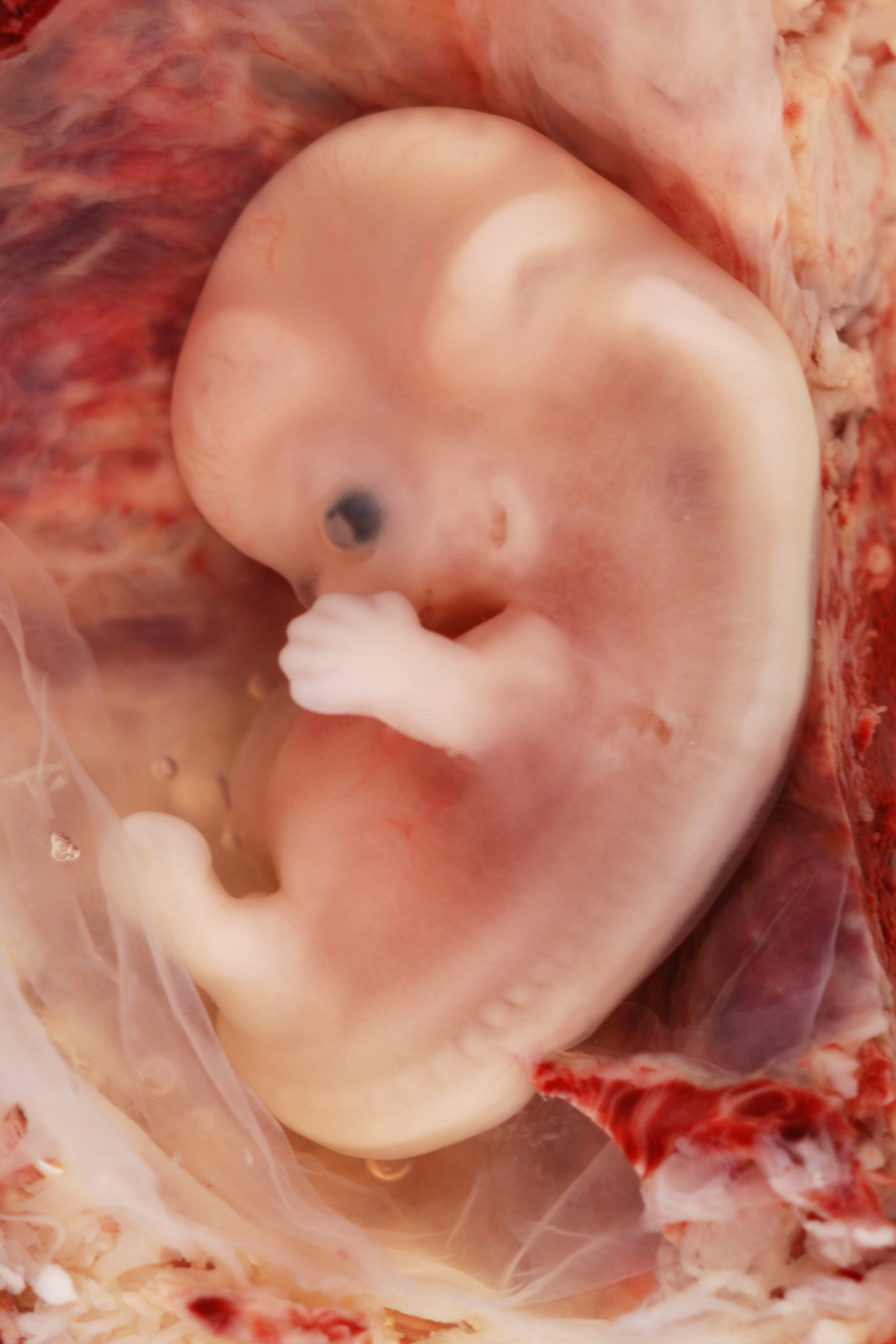
Nine-week-old human embryo from an ectopic pregnancy

Organogenesis is the development of the organs that begins during the third to eighth week, and continues until birth. Sometimes full development, as in the lungs, continues after birth. Different organs take part in the development of the many organ systems of the body.

=== Blood ===
Haematopoietic stem cells that give rise to all the blood cells develop from the mesoderm. The development of blood formation takes place in clusters of blood cells, known as blood islands, in the yolk sac. Blood islands develop outside the embryo, on the umbilical vesicle, allantois, connecting stalk, and chorion, from mesodermal hemangioblasts.

In the centre of a blood island, hemangioblasts form the haematopoietic stem cells that are the precursor to all types of blood cell. In the periphery of a blood island the hemangioblasts differentiate into angioblasts, the precursors to the blood vessels.

=== Heart and circulatory system ===
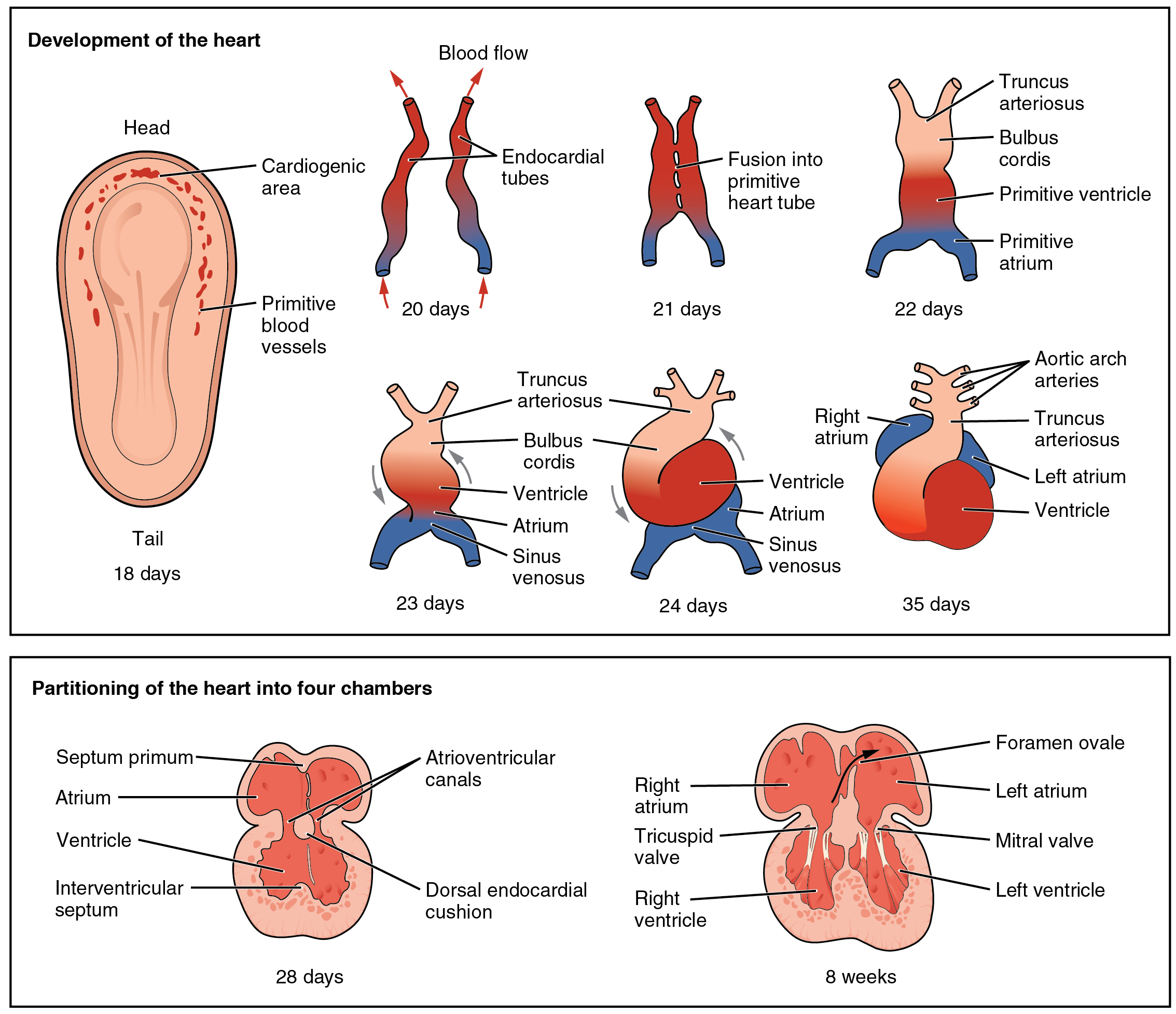

The heart is the first functional organ to develop and starts to beat and pump blood at around 22 days. Cardiac myoblasts and blood islands in the splanchnopleuric mesenchyme on each side of the neural plate give rise to the cardiogenic region.This is a horseshoe-shaped area near to the head of the embryo. By day 19, following cell signalling, two strands begin to form as tubes in this region, as a lumen develops within them. These two endocardial tubes grow and by day 21 have migrated towards each other and fused to form a single primitive heart tube, the tubular heart. This is enabled by the folding of the embryo which pushes the tubes into the thoracic cavity.

Also at the same time that the endocardial tubes are forming, vasculogenesis (the development of the circulatory system) has begun. This starts on day 18 with cells in the splanchnopleuric mesoderm differentiating into angioblasts that develop into flattened endothelial cells. These join to form small vesicles called angiocysts which join up to form long vessels called angioblastic cords. These cords develop into a pervasive network of plexuses in the formation of the vascular network. This network grows by the additional budding and sprouting of new vessels in the process of angiogenesis. Following vasculogenesis and the development of an early vasculature, a stage of vascular remodelling takes place.

The tubular heart quickly forms five distinct regions. From head to tail, these are the infundibulum, bulbus cordis, primitive ventricle, primitive atrium, and the sinus venosus. Initially, all venous blood flows into the sinus venosus, and is propelled from tail to head to the truncus arteriosus. This will divide to form the aorta and pulmonary artery; the bulbus cordis will develop into the right (primitive) ventricle; the primitive ventricle will form the left ventricle; the primitive atrium will become the front parts of the left and right atria and their appendages, and the sinus venosus will develop into the posterior part of the right atrium, the sinoatrial node and the coronary sinus.

Cardiac looping begins to shape the heart as one of the processes of morphogenesis, and this completes by the end of the fourth week. Programmed cell death (apoptosis) at the joining surfaces enables fusion to take place. In the middle of the fourth week, the sinus venosus receives blood from the three major veins: the vitelline, the umbilical and the common cardinal veins.

During the first two months of development, the interatrial septum begins to form. This septum divides the primitive atrium into a right and a left atrium. Firstly it starts as a crescent-shaped piece of tissue which grows downwards as the septum primum. The crescent shape prevents the complete closure of the atria allowing blood to be shunted from the right to the left atrium through the opening known as the ostium primum. This closes with further development of the system but before it does, a second opening (the ostium secundum) begins to form in the upper atrium enabling the continued shunting of blood.

A second septum (the septum secundum) begins to form to the right of the septum primum. This also leaves a small opening, the foramen ovale which is continuous with the previous opening of the ostium secundum. The septum primum is reduced to a small flap that acts as the valve of the foramen ovale and this remains until its closure at birth. Between the ventricles the septum inferius also forms which develops into the muscular interventricular septum.

=== Digestive system ===
The digestive system starts to develop from the third week and by the twelfth week, the organs have correctly positioned themselves. As a result of the cephalocaudal and lateral folding of the embryo, a portion of the endoderm-lined yolk sac cavity is incorporated into the embryo to form the primitive gut. In the cephalic and caudal parts of the embryo, the primitive gut forms a tube, the foregut and hindgut, respectively. The middle part, the midgut, remains temporally connected to the yolk sac by means of the vitelline duct.

The foregut gives rise to the esophagus, the trachea, lung buds, the stomach, and the duodenum proximal to the entrance of the bile duct. In addition, the liver, pancreas, and biliary apparatus develop as outgrowths of the endodermal epithelium of the upper part of the duodenum. Since the upper part of the foregut is divided by the tracheoesophageal septum into the esophagus posteriorly and the trachea and lung buds anteriorly, deviation of the septum may result in abnormal openings between the trachea and esophagus. The epithelial liver cords and biliary system growing out into the septum transversum differentiate into parenchyma. Hematopoietic cells (present in the liver in greater numbers before birth than afterward), Kupffer cells, and connective tissue cells originate in the mesoderm. The pancreas develops from a ventral bud and a dorsal bud that later fuse to form the definitive pancreas. Sometimes, the two parts surround the duodenum (annular pancreas), causing constriction of the gut.

The midgut forms the primary intestinal loop, from which originates the distal duodenum to the entrance of the bile duct. The loop continues to the junction of the proximal two-thirds of the transverse colon with the distal third. At its apex, the primary loop remains temporarily in open connection with the yolk sac through the vitelline duct. During the sixth week, the loop grows so rapidly that it protrudes into the umbilical cord (physiological herniation). In the 10th week, it returns into the abdominal cavity. While these processes are occurring, the midgut loop rotates 270° counterclockwise. Common abnormalities at this stage of development include remnants of the vitelline duct, failure of the midgut to return to the abdominal cavity, malrotation, stenosis, and duplication of parts.

The hindgut gives rise to the region from the distal third of the transverse colon to the upper part of the anal canal. The distal part of the anal canal originates from the ectoderm. The hindgut enters the posterior region of the cloaca (future anorectal canal), and the allantois enters the anterior region (future urogenital sinus). The urorectal septum divides the two regions and breakdown of the cloacal membrane covering this area provides communication to the exterior for the anus and urogenital sinus. The upper part of the anal canal is derived from endoderm of the hindgut. The lower part (one-third) is derived from ectoderm around the proctodeum. Ectoderm, in the region of the proctodeum on the surface of part of the cloaca, proliferates and invaginates to create the anal pit. Subsequently, degeneration of the cloacal membrane establishes continuity between the upper and lower parts of the anal canal. Abnormalities in the size of the posterior region of the cloaca shift the entrance of the anus anteriorly, causing rectovaginal and rectourethral fistulas and atresias.

=== Respiratory system ===
The respiratory system develops from the lung bud, which appears in the ventral wall of the foregut about four weeks into development. The lung bud forms the trachea and two lateral growths known as the bronchial buds, which enlarge at the beginning of the fifth week to form the left and right main bronchi. These bronchi in turn form secondary (lobar) bronchi; three on the right and two on the left (reflecting the number of lung lobes). Tertiary bronchi form from secondary bronchi.

While the internal lining of the larynx originates from the lung bud, its cartilages and muscles originate from the fourth and sixth pharyngeal arches.

=== Urinary system ===
==== Kidneys ====
Three different kidney systems form in the developing embryo: the pronephros, the mesonephros and the metanephros. Only the metanephros develops into the permanent kidney. All three are derived from the intermediate mesoderm.

===== Pronephros =====
The pronephros derives from the intermediate mesoderm in the cervical region. It is not functional and degenerates before the end of the fourth week.

===== Mesonephros =====
The mesonephros derives from intermediate mesoderm in the upper thoracic to upper lumbar segments. Excretory tubules are formed and enter the mesonephric duct, which ends in the cloaca. The mesonephric duct atrophies in females, but participate in development of the reproductive system in males.

===== Metanephros =====
The metanephros appears in the fifth week of development. An outgrowth of the mesonephric duct, the ureteric bud, penetrates metanephric tissue to form the primitive renal pelvis, renal calyces and renal pyramids. The ureter is also formed.

==== Bladder and urethra ====
Between the fourth and seventh weeks of development, the urorectal septum divides the cloaca into the urogenital sinus and the anal canal. The upper part of the urogenital sinus forms the bladder, while the lower part forms the urethra.

=== Reproductive system ===
The gonads form in the fourth and fifth weeks from the urogenital ridges and stay indifferent until about the sixth week. In embryos with a Y chromosome the SRY gene turns the gonad into a testis, whose hormones cause the Mullerian ducts to regress and the Wolffian ducts to form the male internal genitalia; without SRY an ovary develops and the Mullerian ducts form the fallopian tubes, uterus and upper vagina. The external genitalia look the same in both sexes until about the ninth week.

=== Integumentary system ===
The superficial layer of the skin, the epidermis, is derived from the ectoderm. The deeper layer, the dermis, is derived from mesenchyme.

The formation of the epidermis begins in the second month of development and it acquires its definitive arrangement at the end of the fourth month. The ectoderm divides to form a flat layer of cells on the surface known as the periderm. Further division forms the individual layers of the epidermis.

The mesenchyme that will form the dermis is derived from three sources:

- The mesenchyme that forms the dermis in the limbs and body wall derives from the lateral plate mesoderm
- The mesenchyme that forms the dermis in the back derives from paraxial mesoderm
- The mesenchyme that forms the dermis in the face and neck derives from neural crest cells

=== Nervous system ===
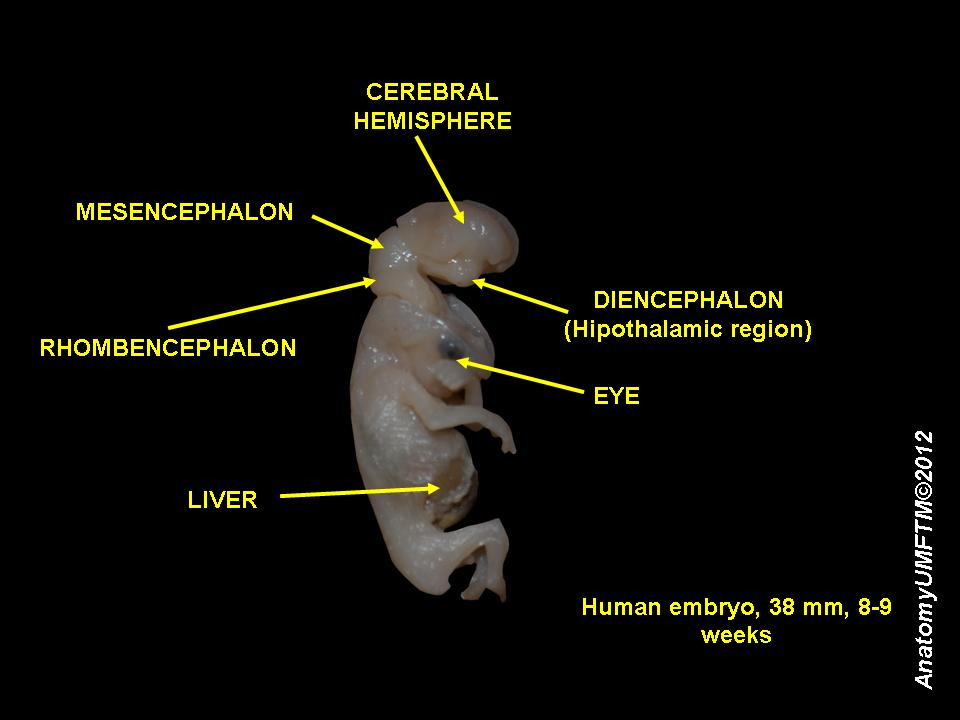
Development of brain in eight-week-old embryo

Late in the fourth week, the superior part of the neural tube bends ventrally as the cephalic flexure at the level of the future midbrain—the mesencephalon. Above the mesencephalon is the prosencephalon (future forebrain) and beneath it is the rhombencephalon (future hindbrain).

Cranial neural crest cells migrate to the pharyngeal arches as neural stem cells, where they develop in the process of neurogenesis into neurons.

The optical vesicle (which eventually becomes the optic nerve, retina and iris) forms at the basal plate of the prosencephalon. The alar plate of the prosencephalon expands to form the cerebral hemispheres (the telencephalon) whilst its basal plate becomes the diencephalon. Finally, the optic vesicle grows to form an optic outgrowth.

== Development of physical features ==
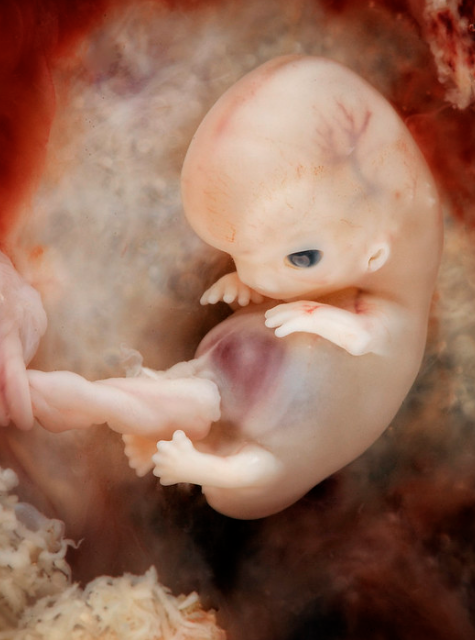
Human embryo at 7-8 weeks from conception.

=== Face and neck ===
From the third to the eighth week the face and neck develop. They consist of three different layers: the ectoderm; the mesoderm and the endoderm.

In the fourth week the pharyngeal arches form, which contribute to the physical appearance of the embryo due to them being the main components of what becomes the face and neck. The tongue also begins to develop in the fourth week.

The thyroid also forms in this early stage and descends to where it will remain at the seventh week; it does not, however, begin functioning until the third month when it starts producing colloid.

The nasal pits will begin to deepen further and form nasal sacs in the sixth week, these will grow in front of the brain and start of disconnected from the oral cavity because of the oronasal membrane.The membrane does then disappear in the seventh week which connects the two.

=== Ears ===
The inner ear, middle ear and outer ear have distinct embryological origins.

==== Inner ear ====
At about 22 days into development, the ectoderm on each side of the rhombencephalon thickens to form otic placodes. These placodes invaginate to form otic pits, and then otic vesicles. The otic vesicles then form ventral and dorsal components.

The ventral component forms the saccule and the cochlear duct. In the sixth week of development the cochlear duct emerges and penetrates the surrounding mesenchyme, travelling in a spiral shape until it forms 2.5 turns by the end of the eighth week. The saccule is the remaining part of the ventral component. It remains connected to the cochlear duct via the narrow ductus reuniens.

The dorsal component forms the utricle and semicircular canals.

==== Middle ear ====
The first pharyngeal pouch lengthens and expands to form the tubotympanic recess. This recess differentiates to form most of the tympanic cavity of the middle ear, and all of the Eustachian or auditory tube. The narrow auditory tube connects the tympanic cavity to the pharynx.

The bones of the middle ear, the ossicles, derive from the cartilages of the pharyngeal arches. The malleus and incus derive from the cartilage of the first pharyngeal arch, whereas the stapes derives from the cartilage of the second pharyngeal arch.

==== Outer ear ====
The external auditory meatus develops from the dorsal portion of the first pharyngeal cleft. Six auricular hillocks, which are mesenchymal proliferations at the dorsal aspects of the first and second pharyngeal arches, form the auricle of the ear.

=== Eyes ===
The eyes begin to develop from the third week to the tenth week. The neural ectoderm, the surface ectoderm, and the periocular mesenchyme contribute to the development of the eye.

Movements of embryo at nine weeks gestational age

=== Limbs ===
At the end of the fourth week limb development begins. Limb buds appear on the ventrolateral aspect of the body. They consist of an outer layer of ectoderm and an inner part consisting of mesenchyme which is derived from the parietal layer of lateral plate mesoderm. Ectodermal cells at the distal end of the buds form the apical ectodermal ridge, which creates an area of rapidly proliferating mesenchymal cells known as the progress zone. Cartilage (some of which ultimately becomes bone) and muscle develop from the mesenchyme.

== Clinical significance ==
Toxic exposures in the embryonic period can be the cause of major congenital malformations, since the precursors of the major organ systems are now developing.

Each cell of the preimplantation embryo has the potential to form all of the different cell types in the developing embryo. This cell potency means that some cells can be removed from the preimplantation embryo and the remaining cells will compensate for their absence. This has allowed the development of a technique known as preimplantation genetic diagnosis, whereby a small number of cells from the preimplantation embryo created by IVF, can be removed by biopsy and subjected to genetic diagnosis. This allows embryos that are not affected by defined genetic diseases to be selected and then transferred to the pregnant woman's uterus.

Sacrococcygeal teratomas, tumours formed from different types of tissue, that can form, are thought to be related to primitive streak remnants, which ordinarily disappear.

First arch syndromes are congenital disorders of facial deformities, caused by the failure of neural crest cells to migrate to the first pharyngeal arch.

Spina bifida a congenital disorder is the result of the incomplete closure of the neural tube.

Vertically transmitted infections can be passed from the pregnant woman to the unborn child at any stage of its development.

Hypoxia, a condition of inadequate oxygen supply, can be a serious consequence of a preterm or premature birth.

== See also ==
- Embryo loss
- Aorta-gonad-mesonephros
- CDX2
- Developmental biology
- Drosophila embryogenesis
- Embryomics
- Human tooth development
- List of human cell types derived from the germ layers
- Potential person
- Recapitulation theory
- The Human Embryo
- Timeline of human prenatal development

== Additional images ==
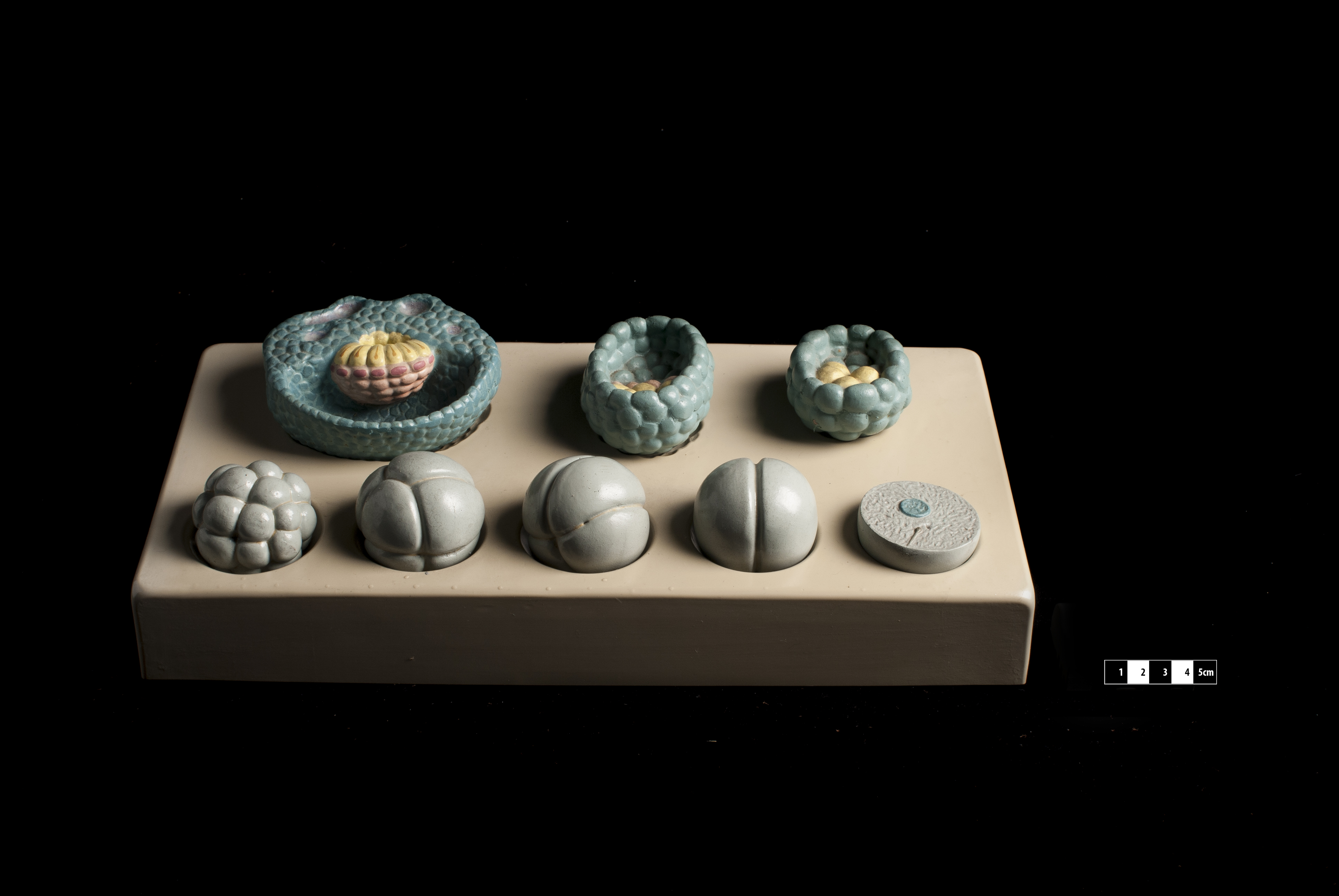
Representing different stages of embryogenesis

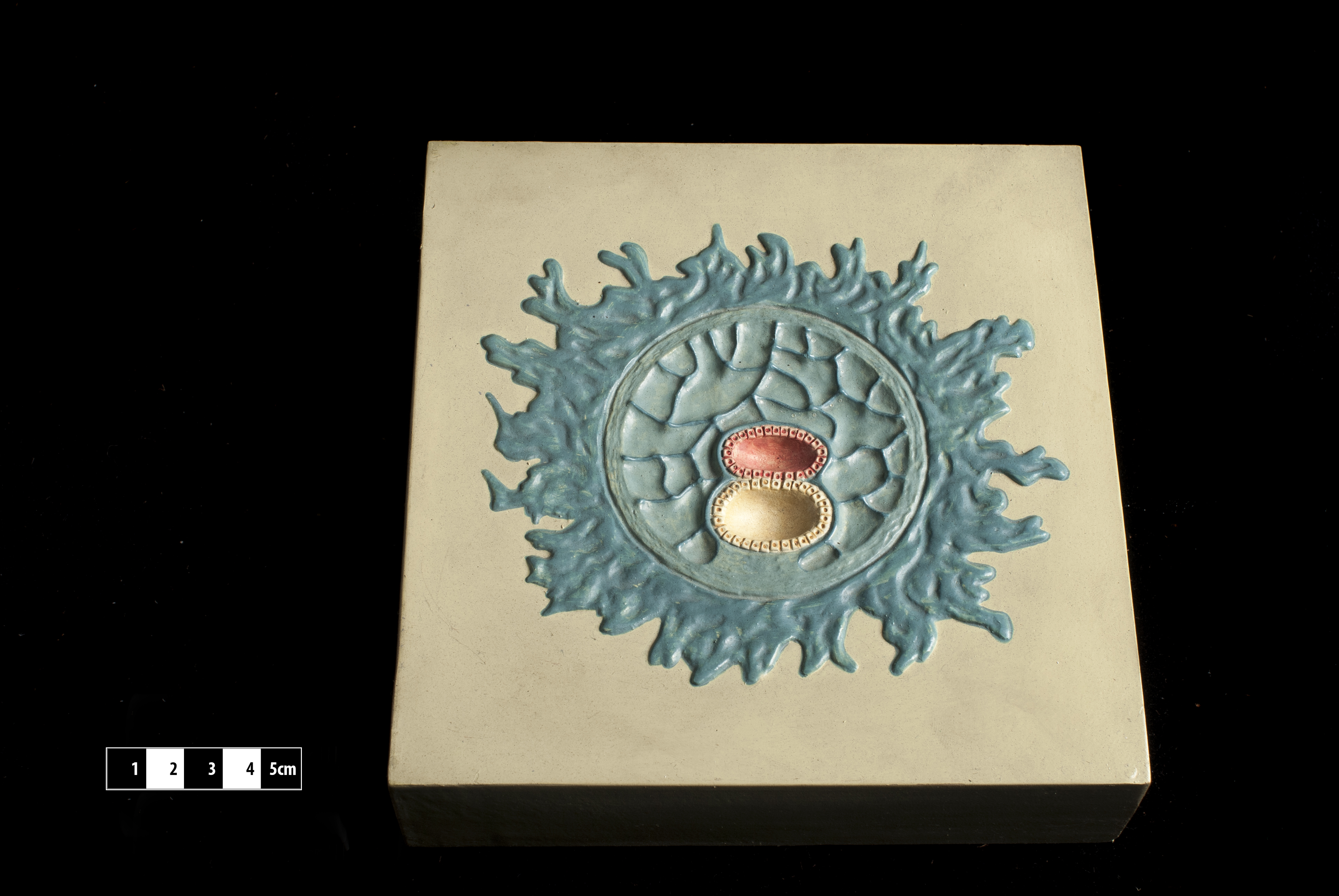
Early stage of the gastrulation process

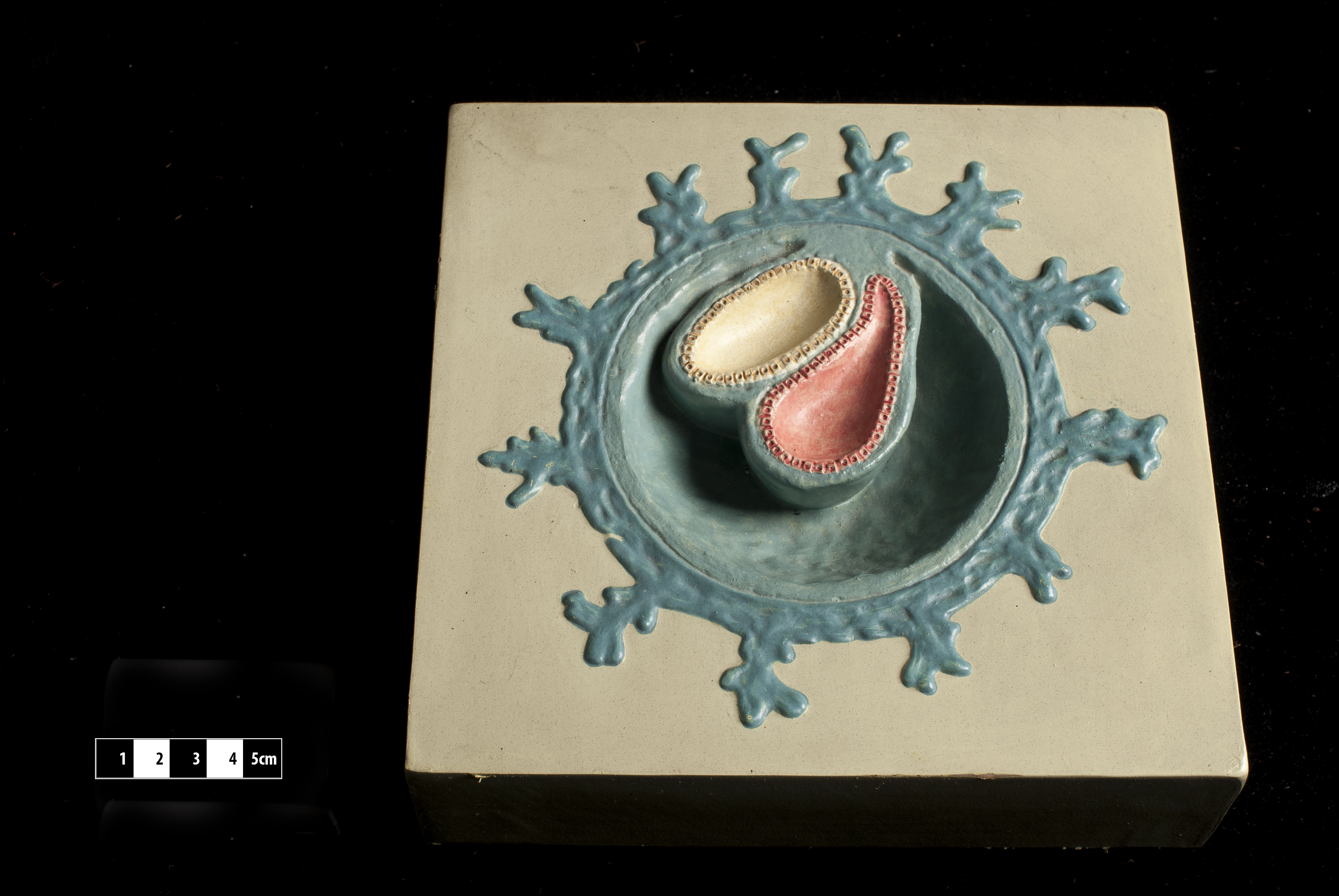
Phase of the gastrulation process

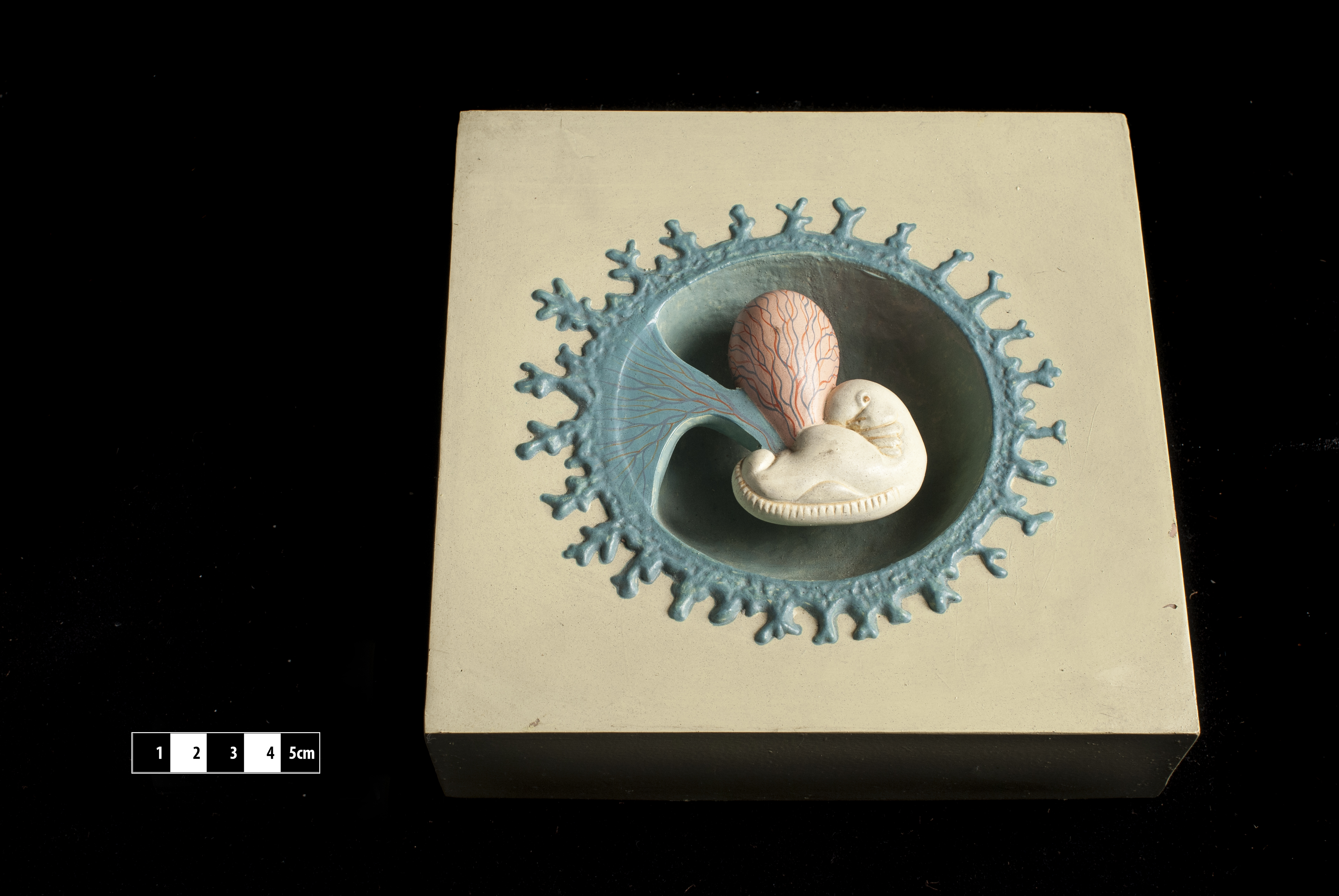
Top of the form of the embryo

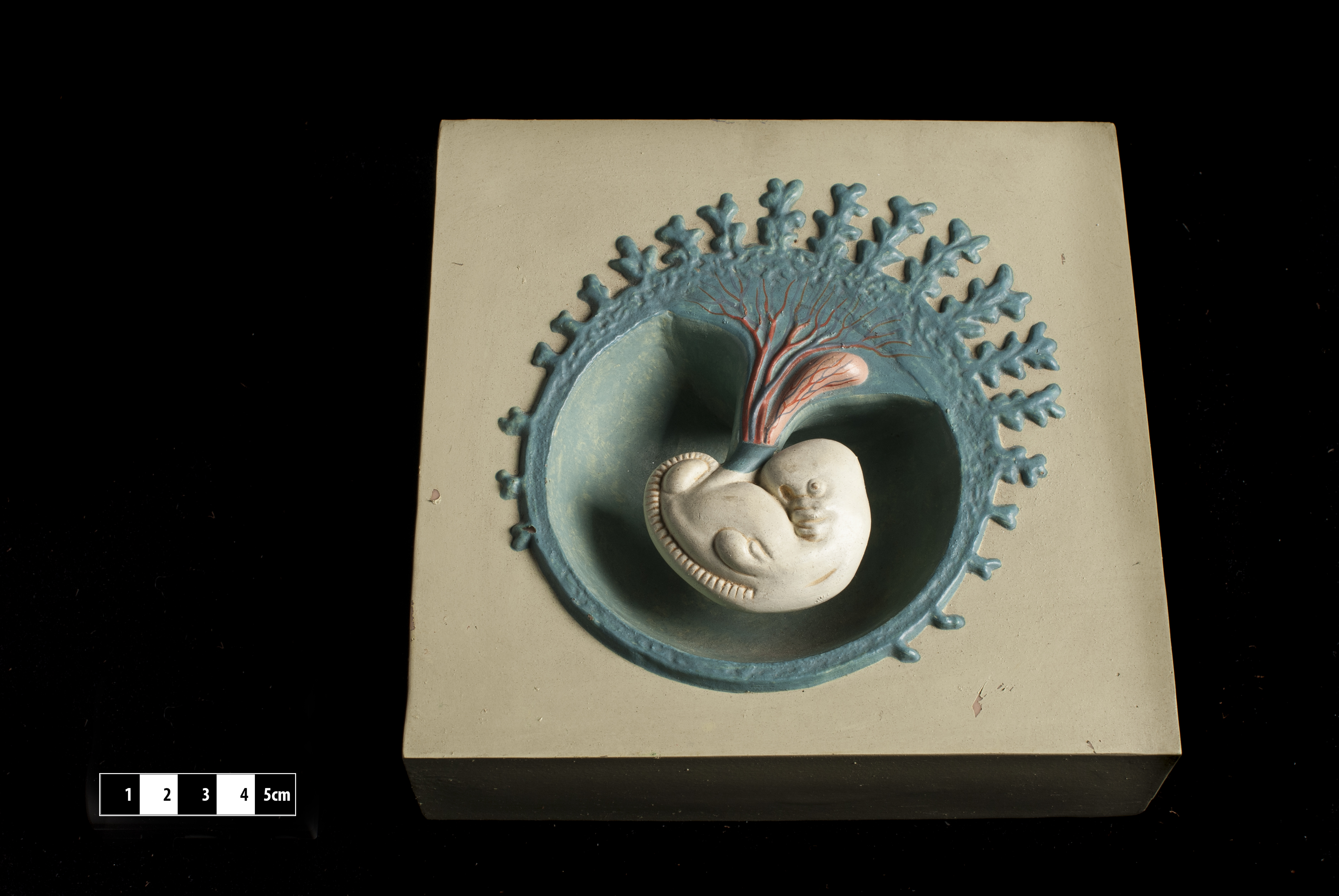
Establishment of embryo medium

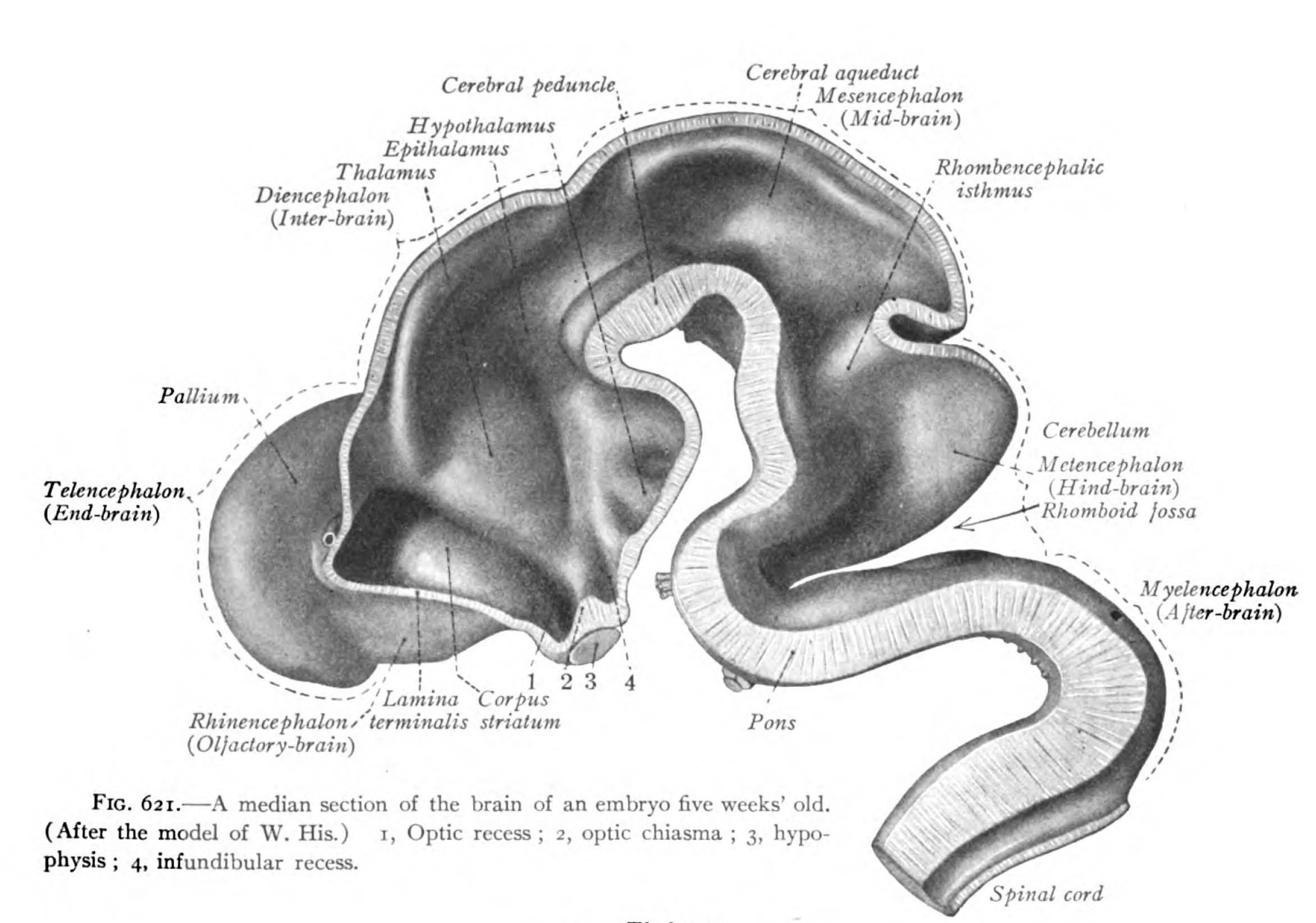
Spinal cord at five weeks

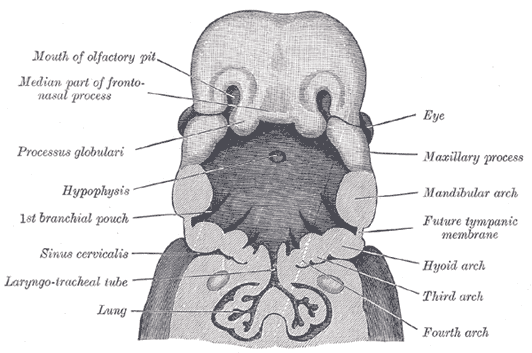
Head and neck at 32 days
