= Blighted ovum =

Anembryonic gestation
- Other names: Anembryonic gestation, anembryonic pregnancy
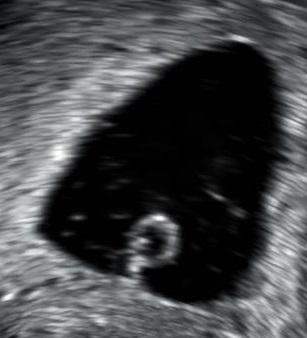
- Transvaginal ultrasonography showing a gestational sac with a diameter of 28 mm, corresponding to a gestational age of approximately 7 weeks and 5 days. It contains a yolk sac (protruding from its lower part) but no embryo, even after scanning across all planes of the gestational sac, thus being diagnostic of an anembryonic gestation.
- Specialty: Obstetrics

A blighted ovum is a pregnancy in which the embryo is reabsorbed or never develops at all. In a normal pregnancy, an embryo would be visible on an ultrasound by six weeks after the woman's last menstrual period. Anembryonic gestation is one of the causes of miscarriage of a pregnancy and accounts for roughly half of first-trimester miscarriages. A blighted ovum cannot result in a viable pregnancy.

A blighted ovum or anembryonic gestation is characterized by a normal-appearing gestational sac, but the absence of an embryo. It likely occurs as a result of early embryonic death with continued development of the trophoblast. When small, the sac cannot be distinguished from the early normal pregnancy, as there may be a yolk sac, though a fetal pole is not seen. In anembryonic pregnancy, levels of the pregnancy hormone human chorionic gonadotropin (hCG) typically rise for a time, which can cause positive pregnancy test results and pregnancy symptoms such as tender breasts. Because of the presence of hCG, an ultrasound is typically necessary to diagnose an anembryonic pregnancy. For diagnosis, the sac must be of sufficient size that the absence of normal embryonic elements is established. The criteria depends on the type of ultrasound exam performed. A transvaginal ultrasound provides a better view of early pregnancy than a transabdominal ultrasound. Generally, a transvaginal ultrasound is used to investigate a suspected case of blighted ovum. A pregnancy is anembryonic if a transvaginal ultrasound reveals a sac with a mean gestational sac diameter (MGD) greater than 25 mm and no yolk sac, or an MGD >25 mm with no embryo. A transabdominal ultrasound can be used to diagnose anembryonic pregnancy if a gestational sac can be identified, but is empty. An anembryonic pregnancy is never viable, as in viable pregnancy the embryo must form with the gestational sac.

== See also ==
- Ovum
- Products of conception
