= Bilaminar embryonic disc =

Embryonic cell structure

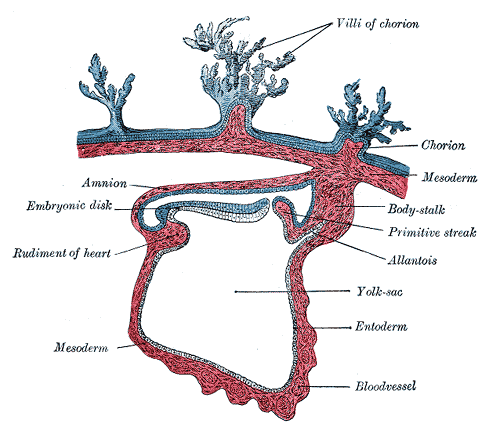
- Section through the embryo. (Bilaminar disc is labeled as embryonic disk.)

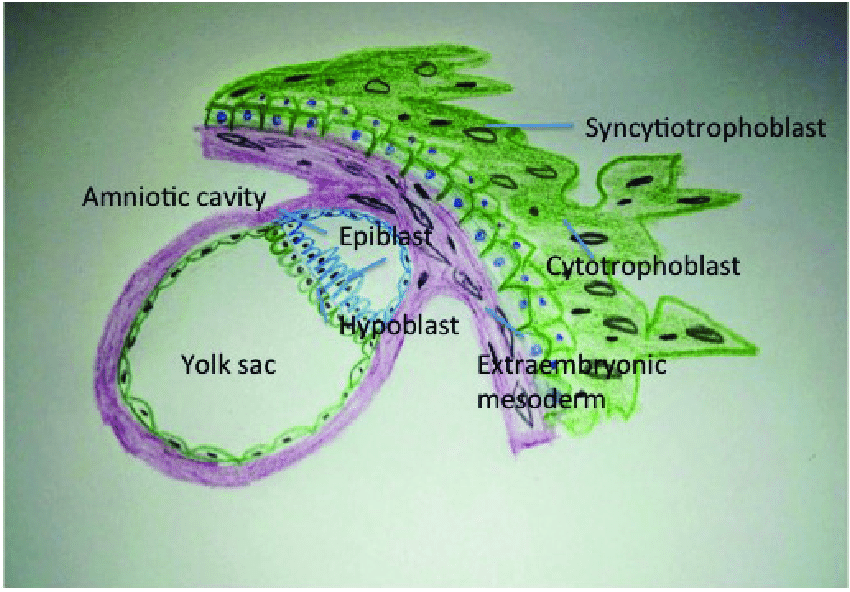
- Embryonic disc at implantation site with epiblast expanded to form the amniotic cavity

Details
- Days: 13
- Precursor: Inner cell mass
- Gives rise to: Human embryo

Identifiers
- TE: embryonic disc_by_E6.0.1.1.3.0.1 E6.0.1.1.3.0.1

The bilaminar embryonic disc, bilaminar blastoderm or embryonic disc is the distinct two-layered structure of cells formed in an embryo. In the development of the human embryo this takes place by day eight. It is formed when the inner cell mass, also known as the embryoblast, forms a bilaminar disc of two layers, an upper layer called the epiblast (primitive ectoderm) and a lower layer called the hypoblast (primitive endoderm), which will eventually form into fetus. These two layers of cells are stretched between two fluid-filled cavities at either end: the primitive yolk sac and the amniotic sac.

The epiblast is adjacent to the trophoblast and made of columnar epithelial cells; the hypoblast is closest to the blastocoel (blastocystic cavity) and made of cuboidal cells. As the two layers become evident, a basement membrane forms between the layers. This distinction of layers of the bilaminar disc defines the primitive dorso ventral axis and polarity in embryogenesis.

The epiblast migrates away from the trophoblast downwards, forming the amniotic cavity in between, the lining of which is formed from amnioblasts developed from the epiblast. The hypoblast is pushed down and forms the yolk sac (exocoelomic cavity) lining. Some hypoblast cells migrate along the inner cytotrophoblast lining of the blastocoel, secreting an extracellular matrix along the way. These hypoblast cells and extracellular matrix are called Heuser's membrane (or the exocoelomic membrane), and they cover the blastocoel to form the yolk sac (or exocoelomic cavity). Cells of the hypoblast migrate along the outer edges of this reticulum and form the extraembryonic mesoderm; this disrupts the extraembryonic reticulum. Soon pockets form in the reticulum, which ultimately coalesce to form the chorionic cavity (extraembryonic coelom).

== Initial formation ==
The one-celled zygote, a eukaryotic cell formed by a fertilization event between two gametes at the start of embryonic development, undergoes cleavage by mitosis as it travels through the fallopian tube to the uterus. As the zygote undergoes cell division to form two, then four, then eight and then 16 cells (typically by day four after fertilization), it becomes a ball of cells called a morula. During these cellular divisions, the zygote remains the same size, but the number of cells increase. The morula enters the uterus after three or four days—during which a cavity, called the blastocoel, is formed to produce the blastocyst. Once the blastocyst is formed, it undergoes implantation into the endometrium. During implantation the blastocyst, which contains the inner cell mass, undergoes cellular differentiation into the two layers of the bilaminar embryonic disc. One of which is the epiblast, also known as the primitive ectoderm. The epiblast is the outer layer of the bilaminar embryonic disc and consists of columnar cells. The hypoblast, also known as the primitive endoderm, is the inner layer, closest to the endometrium, which consists of cuboidal cells. The epiblast will develop into the 'embryo proper', and the hypoblast into the outer layer of fetal membranes (extraembryonic membranes). The blastocyst serves as a source of nutrients for the growing cells by diffusion from the surrounding fluid.

== Amniotic sac formation ==
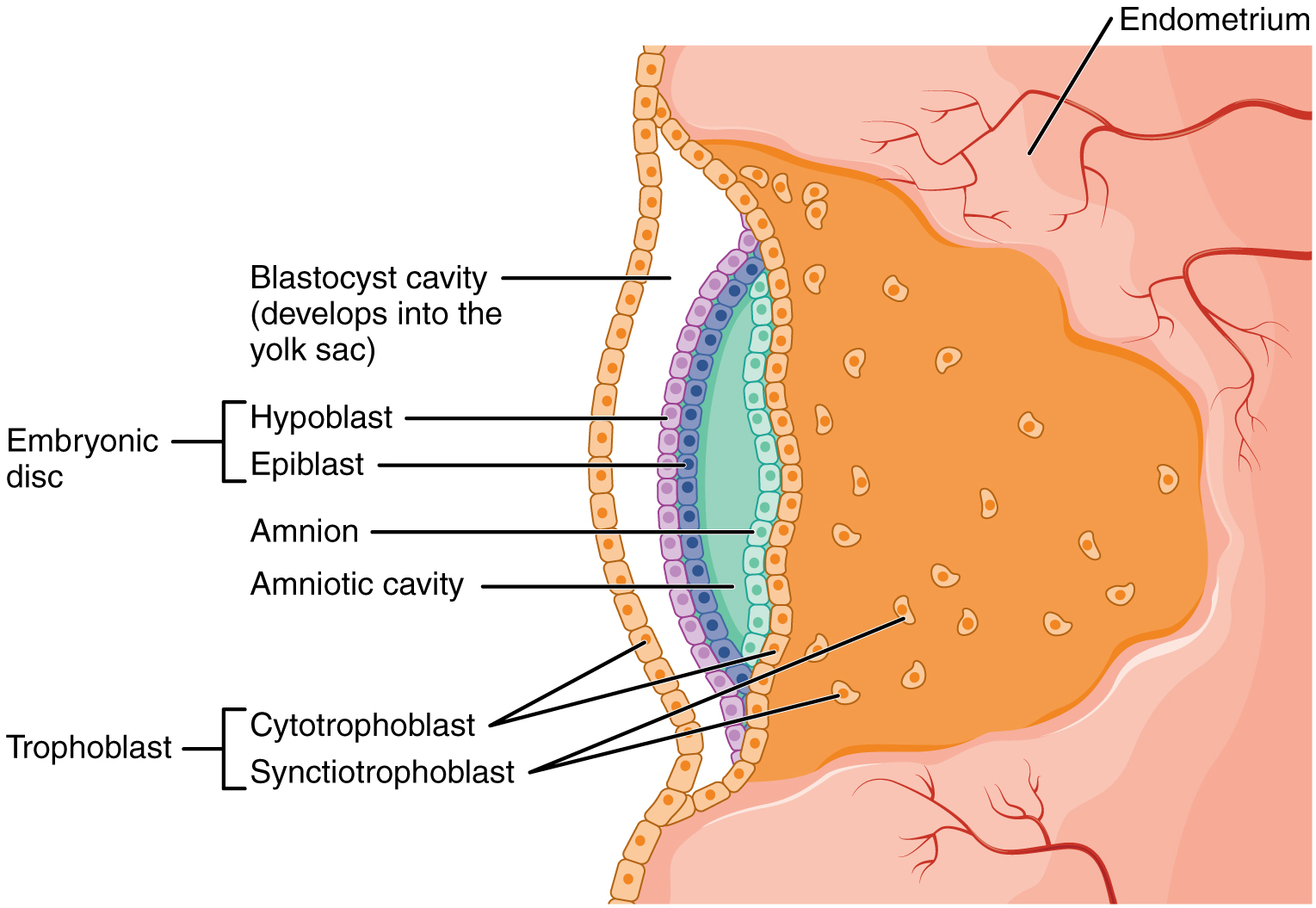
Image showing the bilaminar embryonic disc with its surrounding structures by day eight of embryonic development

Beginning on day eight, the amniotic sac is the first new cavity to form during the second week of development. Fluid collects between the epiblast and the hypoblast, which splits the epiblast into two portions. The layer at the embryonic pole grows around the amniotic sac, creating a barrier from the cytotrophoblast. This becomes known as the amnion, which is one of the four fetal membranes and the cells it comprises are referred to as amnioblasts. Although the amniotic sac is initially smaller than the blastocyst it becomes larger by week eight until the entire embryo is encompassed by the amnion.

== Yolk sac and gestational sac formation ==
The process of the formation of the gestational sac (chorionic cavity or extraembryonic coelom) and the yolk sac (umbilical vesicle) is still debated. The main theory states that formation of the membranes of the yolk sac begins with an increase in production of hypoblast cells, followed by different patterns of migration. On day eight, the first portion of hypoblast cells begin their migration and make what is known as the primary yolk sac, or Heuser's membrane (exocoelomic membrane). By day 12, the primary yolk sac has been disestablished by a new batch of migrating hypoblast cells that now contribute to the definitive yolk sac.

While the primary yolk sac is forming, extraembryonic mesoderm migrate into the blastocyst cavity and fill it with loosely packed cells. When the extraembryonic mesoderm is separated into two portions, a new gap arises called the gestational sac. This new cavity is responsible for detaching the embryo and, its amnion and yolk sac, from the far wall of the blastocyst, which is now named the chorion. When the extraembryonic mesoderm splits into two layers, the amnion, yolk sac and chorion also become double-layered. The amnion and chorion are composed of extraembryonic ectoderm and mesoderm, whereas the yolk sac is composed of extraembryonic endoderm and mesoderm. By day 13, the connecting stalk, a dense portion of extraembryonic mesoderm, restrains the embryonic disc in the gestational sac.

=== Yolk sac during development ===
Like the amnion, the yolk sac is a fetal membrane that surrounds a cavity. Formation of the definitive yolk sac occurs after the extraembryonic mesoderm splits, and it becomes a double layered structure with hypoblast-derived endoderm on the inside and mesoderm surrounding the outside. The definitive yolk sac contributes greatly to the embryo during the fourth week of development, and executes critical functions for the embryo. One of which being the formation of blood, or hematopoiesis. Also, primordial germ cells are first found in the wall of the yolk sac before primordial germ cell migration. After the fourth week of development, the growing embryonic disc becomes much larger than the yolk sac and eventually involutes before birth. Uncommonly, the yolk sac may persist as the vitelline duct and cause a congenital out pouching of the digestive tract called Meckel's diverticulum.

== Epiblast cells during gastrulation ==
In the third week, gastrulation begins with the formation of the primitive streak. Gastrulation occurs when pluripotent stem cells differentiate into the three germ cell layers: ectoderm, mesoderm and endoderm. During gastrulation, cells of the epiblast migrate towards the primitive streak, enter it, and then move apart from it through a process called ingression.

=== Definitive endoderm development ===
On day 16, epiblast cells that are next to the primitive streak experience epithelial-to-mesenchymal transformation as they ingress through the primitive streak. The first wave of epiblast cells takes over the hypoblast, which slowly becomes replaced by new cells that eventually constitute the definitive endoderm. The definitive endoderm is what makes the lining of the gut and other associated gut structures.

=== Intraembryonic mesoderm development ===
Also beginning on day 16, some of the ingressing epiblast cells make their way into the area between the epiblast and the newly forming definitive endoderm. This layer of cells becomes known as intraembryonic mesoderm. After the cells have moved bilaterally from the primitive streak and matured, four divisions of intraembryonic mesoderm are made: cardiogenic mesoderm, paraxial mesoderm, intermediate mesoderm and lateral plate mesoderm.

=== Ectoderm development ===
After the definitive endoderm and intraembryonic mesoderm formations are complete, the remaining epiblast cells do not ingress through the primitive streak; rather they remain on the outside and form the ectoderm. It is not long until the ectoderm becomes the neural plate and surface ectoderm. Due to the fact that an embryo develops cranial to caudal, the formation of ectoderm does not happen at the same rate during development. The more inferior portion of the primitive streak will still have epiblast cells ingressing to make intraembryonic mesoderm, while the more superior portion has already stopped ingressing. However, eventually gastrulation finishes and the three germ layers are complete.
