= Timeline of human prenatal development =

Gestational age is the time that has passed since the onset of the last menstruation, which generally or as standard occurs 2 weeks before the actual fertilization. Embryonic age, in contrast measures the actual age of the embryo or fetus from the time of fertilization. Nevertheless, menstruation has historically been the only means of estimating embryonal/fetal age, and is still the presumed measure if not else specified. However, the actual duration between last menstruation and fertilization may in fact differ from the standard 2 weeks by several days.

Thus, the first week of embryonic age is already week three counting with gestational age.

Furthermore, the number of the week is one more than the actual age of the embryo/fetus. For example, the embryo is 0 whole weeks old during the 1st week after fertilization.

The following table summarizes the various expression systems during week number x of gestation.

	Week number	Initial age (whole weeks)
Gestational	x	x-1
Embryonic	x-2	x-3

== Changes by weeks of gestation ==
=== Embryonic stage ===
==== Week 3 ====
Gestational age: 2 weeks and 0 days until 2 weeks and 6 days old. 15–21 days from last menstruation.

Embryonic age: Week nr 1. 0 (whole) weeks old. 1–7 days from fertilization.

- Fertilization of the ovum to form a new human organism, the human zygote. (day 1 of fertilization)
- The zygote undergoes mitotic cellular divisions, but does not increase in size. This mitosis is also known as cleavage. A hollow cavity forms marking the blastocyst stage. (day 1.5–3 of fertilization.)
- The blastocyst contains only a thin rim of trophoblast cells and a clump of cells at one end known as the "embryonic pole" which include embryonic stem cells.
- The embryo hatches from its protein shell (zona pellucida) and performs implantation onto the endometrial lining of the mother's uterus. (day 5–6 of fertilization.)
- If separation into identical twins occurs, 1/3 of the time it will happen before day 5.

==== Week 4 ====
Gestational age: 3 weeks and 0 days until 3 weeks and 6 days old. 22–28 days from last menstruation.

Embryonic age: Week nr 2. 1 week old. 8–14 days from fertilization.

- Trophoblast cells surrounding the embryonic cells proliferate and invade deeper into the uterine lining. They will eventually form the placenta and embryonic membranes. The blastocyst is fully implanted day 7–12 of fertilization.
- Formation of the yolk sac.
- The embryonic cells flatten into a disk, two cells thick.
- If separation into identical twins occurs, 2/3 of the time it will happen between days 5 and 9. If it happens after day 9, there is a significant risk of the twins being conjoined.
- Primitive streak develops. (day 13 of fertilization).
- Primary stem villi appear. (day 13 of fertilization).

==== Week 5 ====
Gestational age: 4 weeks and 0 days until 4 weeks and 6 days old. 29–35 days from last menstruation.

Embryonic age: Week nr 3. 2 weeks old. 15–21 days from fertilization.

- A notochord forms in the center of the embryonic disk. (day 16 of fertilization.)
- Gastrulation commences. (day 16 of fertilization.)
- A neural groove (future spinal cord) forms over the notochord with a brain bulge at one end. Neuromeres appear. (day 18 of fertilization.)
- Somites, the divisions of the future vertebra, form. (day 20 of fertilization.)
- Primitive heart tube is forming. Vasculature begins to develop in embryonic disc. (day 20 of fertilization.)

==== Week 6 ====
Gestational age: 5 weeks and 0 days until 5 weeks and 6 days old. 36–42 days from last menstruation.

Embryonic age: Week nr 4. 3 weeks old. 22–28 days from fertilization.

- The embryo measures 4 mm (1/8 in) in length and begins to curve into a C shape.
- The heart bulges, further develops, and begins to beat in a regular rhythm. Septum primum appears.
- Pharyngeal arches, grooves which will form structures of the face and neck, form.
- The neural tube closes.
- The ears begin to form as otic pits.
- Arm buds and a tail are visible.
- Lung bud, the first traits of the lung appear.
- Hepatic plate, the first traits of the liver appear.
- Buccopharyngeal membrane ruptures. This is the future mouth.
- Cystic diverticulum, which will become the gallbladder, and dorsal pancreatic bud, which will become the pancreas appear.
- Urorectal septum begins to form. Thus, the rectal and urinary passageways become separated.
- Anterior and posterior horns differentiate in the spinal cord.
- Spleen appears.
- Ureteric buds appear.

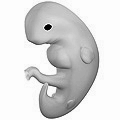
Embryo at 4 weeks after fertilization. This reconciles to Pregnancy Week 6.

==== Week 7 ====
Gestational age: 6 weeks and 0 days until 6 weeks and 6 days old. 43–49 days from last menstruation.

Embryonic age: Week nr 5. 4 weeks old. 29–35 days from fertilization.

- The embryo measures 8 mm (0.31 in) in length and weighs about 1 gram.
- Optic vesicles and optic cups form the start of the developing eye.
- Nasal pits form.
- The brain divides into 5 vesicles, including the early telencephalon.
- Leg buds form and hands form as flat paddles on the arms.
- Rudimentary blood moves through primitive vessels connecting to the yolk sac and chorionic membranes.
- The metanephros, precursor of the definitive kidney, starts to develop.
- The initial stomach differentiation begins.

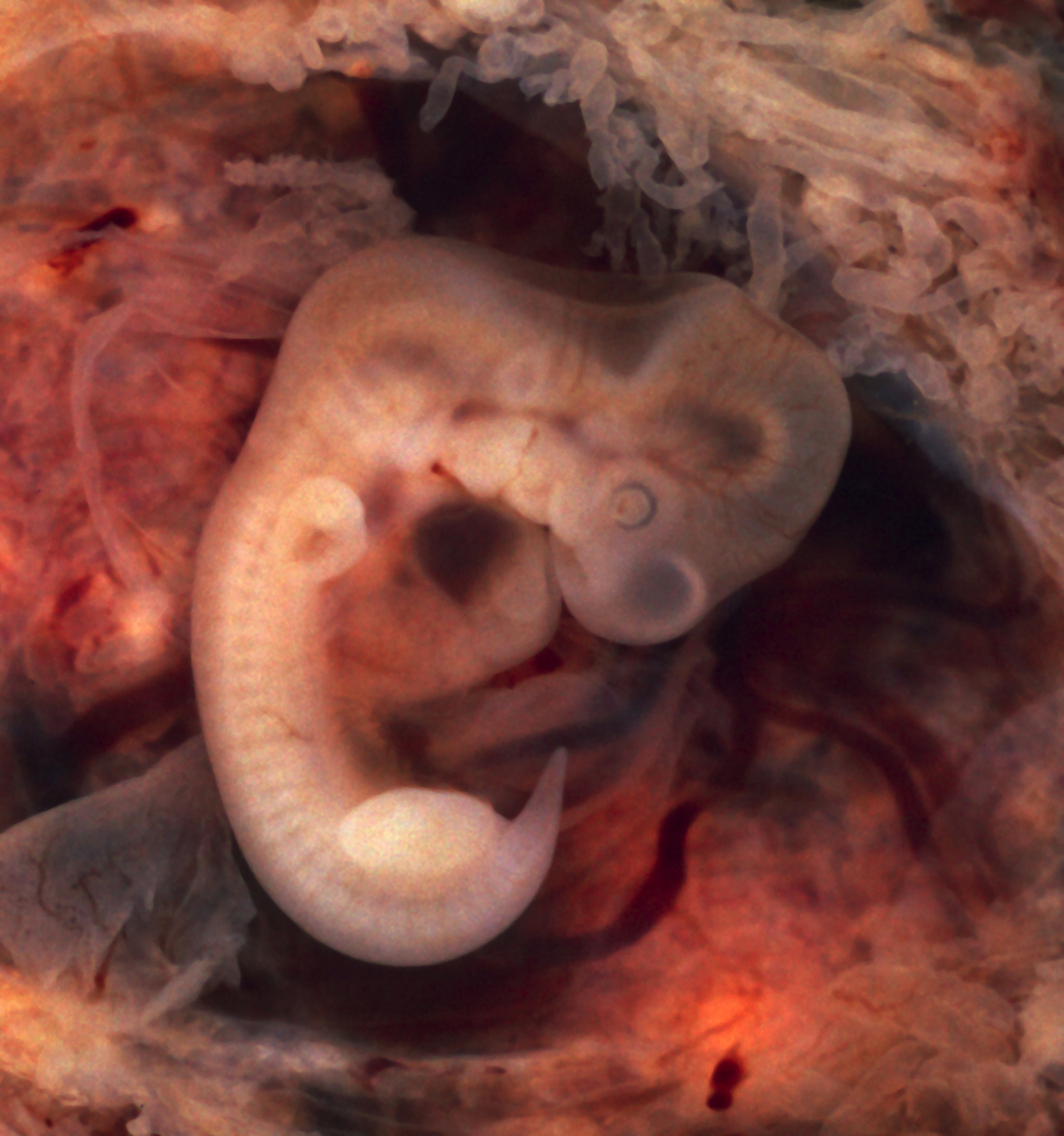
A 10mm embryo from an ectopic pregnancy, still in the oviduct. This embryo is about five weeks old (or from the seventh week of menstrual age). This reconciles to Pregnancy Week 7.

==== Week 8 ====
Gestational age: 7 weeks and 0 days until 7 weeks and 6 days old. 50–56 days from last menstruation.

Embryonic age: Week nr 6. 5 weeks old. 36–42 days from fertilization.

- The embryo measures 13 mm (1/2 in) in length.
- Lungs begin to form.
- The brain continues to develop.
- Arms and legs have lengthened with foot and hand areas distinguishable.
- The hands and feet have digits, but may still be webbed.
- The gonadal ridge begins to be perceptible.
- The lymphatic system begins to develop.
- Main development of sex organs starts.

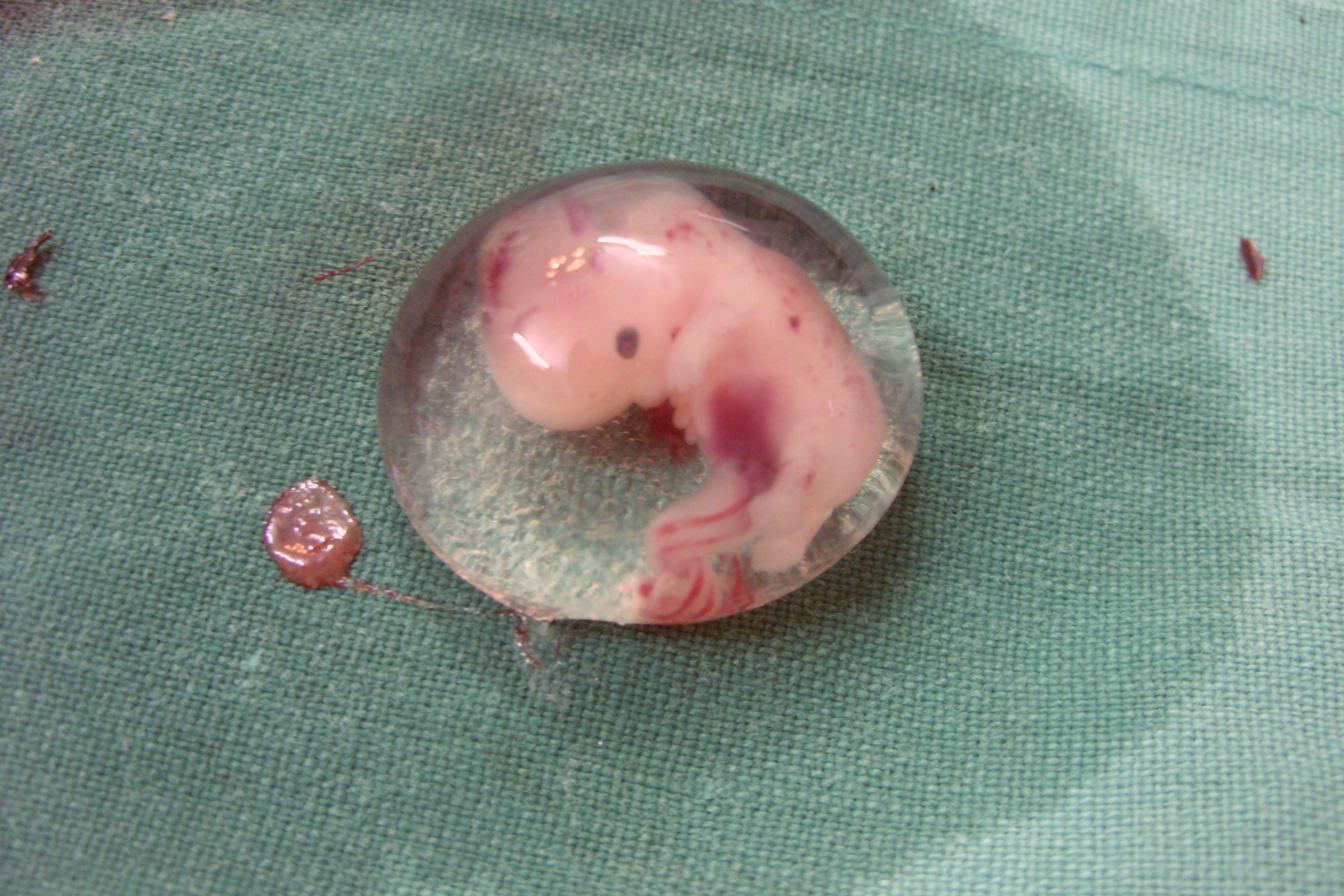
A six-week embryonic age intact human embryo. Reconciled as Pregnancy Week 8.

==== Week 9 ====
Gestational age: 8 weeks and 0 days until 8 weeks and 6 days old. 57–63 days from last menstruation.

Embryonic age: Week nr 7. 6 weeks old. 43–49 days from fertilization.

- The embryo measures 18 mm (3/4 in) in length.
- Fetal heart tone (the sound of the heart beat) can be heard using doppler.
- Nipples and hair follicles begin to form.
- Location of the elbows and toes are visible.
- Spontaneous limb movements may be detected by ultrasound.
- All essential organs have at least begun.
- The vitelline duct normally closes.

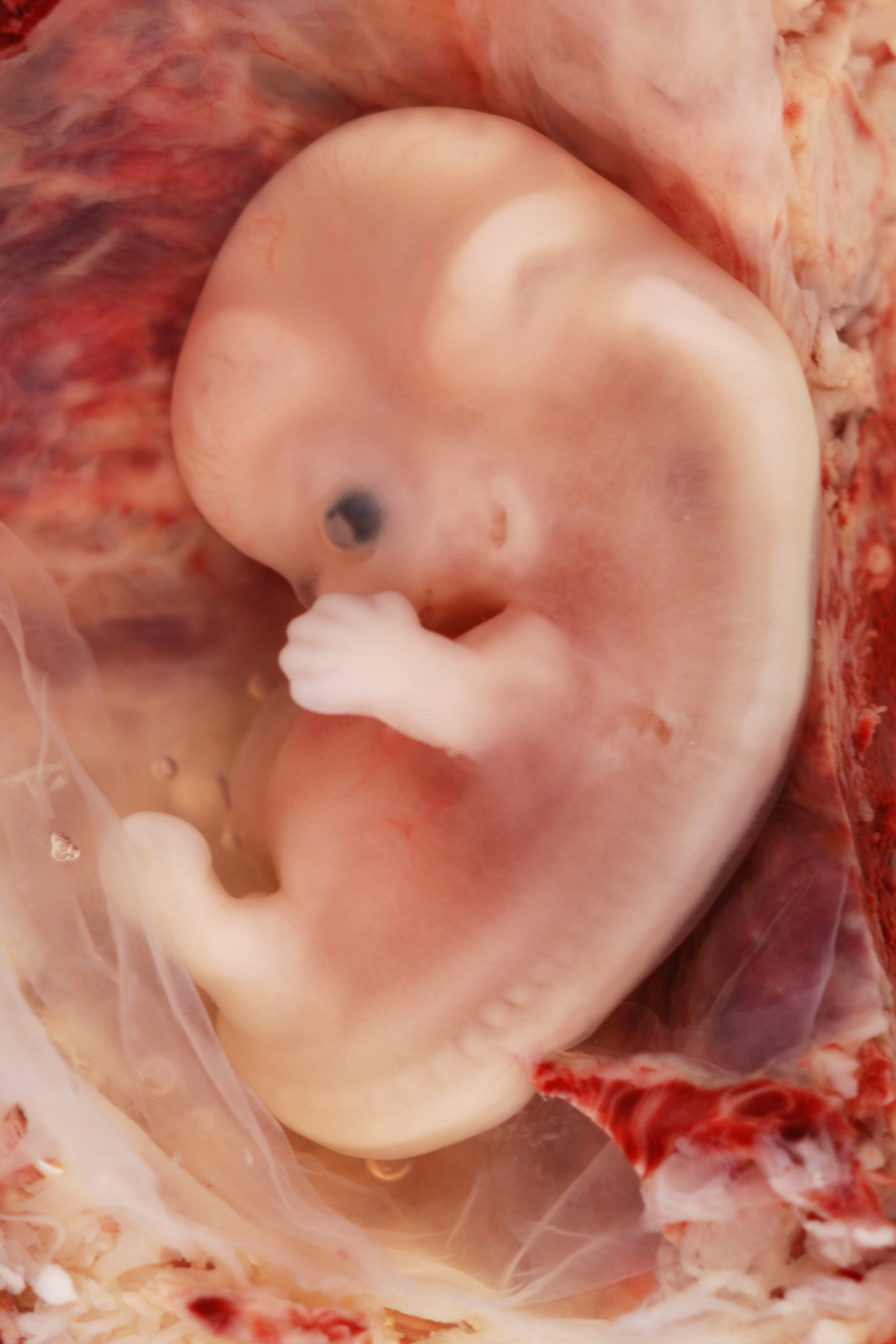
This embryo is also from an ectopic pregnancy, this one in the cornu (the part of the uterus to which the Fallopian tube is attached). The features are consistent with a developmental age of seven weeks. Reconciled as Pregnancy Week 9.

=== Fetal stage ===
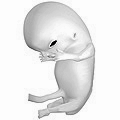
Fetus at 8 weeks after fertilization.

==== Weeks 10 to 12 ====
Gestational age: 9 weeks and 0 days until 11 weeks and 6 days old.

Embryonic age: 7 weeks and 0 days until 9 weeks and 6 days old.

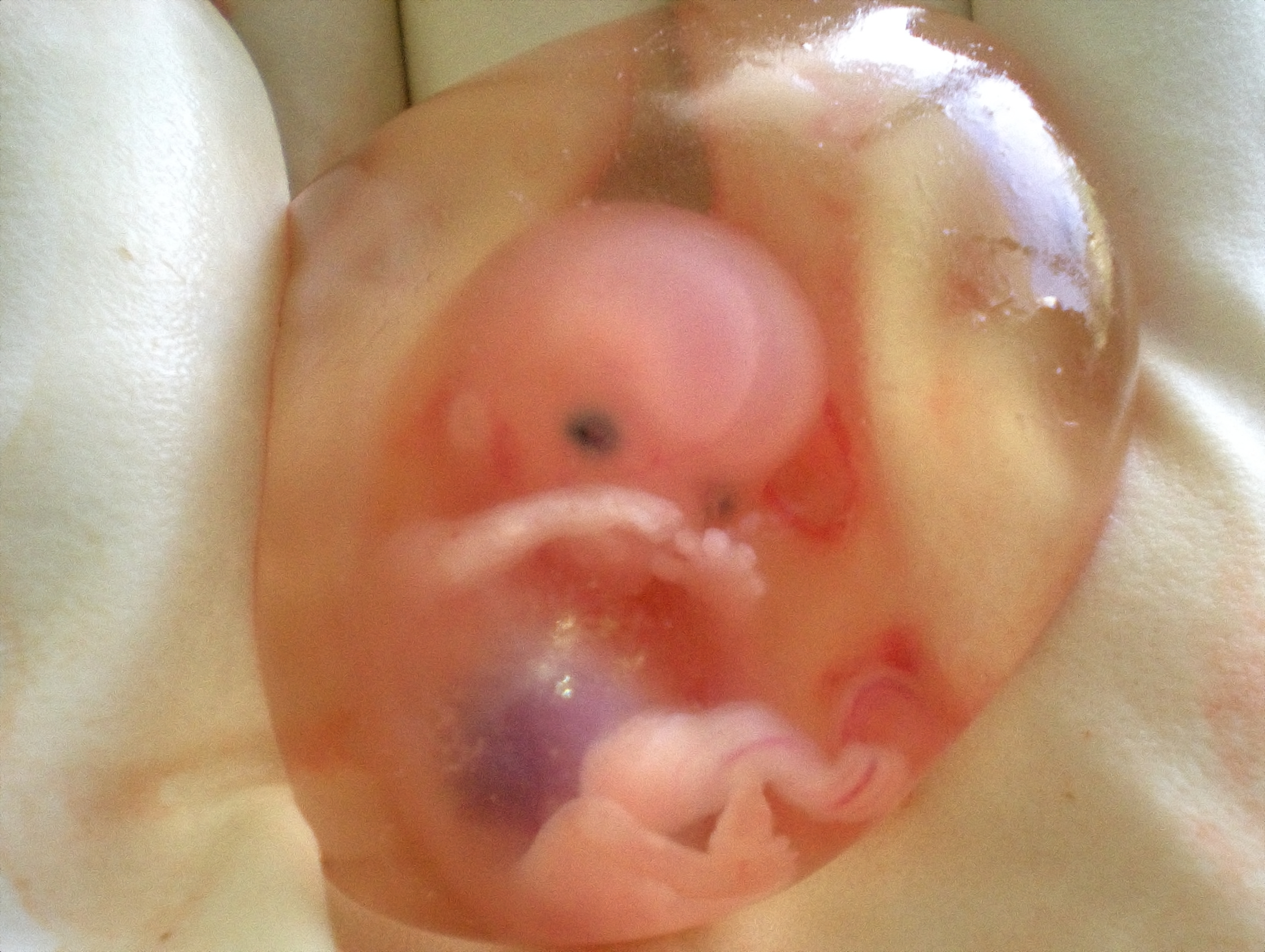
Fetus at 10 weeks

- Embryo measures 30–80 mm (1.2–3.1 in) in length.
- Ventral and dorsal pancreatic buds fuse during the 8th week
- Intestines rotate.
- Facial features continue to develop.
- The eyelids are more developed.
- The external features of the ear begin to take their final shape.
- The head comprises nearly half of the fetus' size.
- The face is well formed.
- The eyelids close and will not reopen until about the 27th week.
- Tooth buds, which will form the baby teeth, appear.
- The limbs are long and thin.
- The fetus can make a fist with its fingers.
- Genitals appear well differentiated.
- Red blood cells are produced in the liver.
- Heartbeat can be detected by ultrasound.

==== Weeks 13 to 16 ====
Gestational age: 12 weeks and 0 days until 15 weeks and 6 days old.

Embryonic age: 10 weeks and 0 days until 13 weeks and 6 days old.

- The fetus reaches a length of about 15 cm (6 in).
- A fine hair called lanugo develops on the head.
- Fetal skin is almost transparent.
- More muscle tissue and bones have developed, and the bones become harder.
- The fetus makes active movements.
- Sucking motions are made with the mouth.
- Meconium is made in the intestinal tract.
- The liver and pancreas produce fluid secretions.
- From week 13, sex prediction by obstetric ultrasonography is almost 100% accurate.
- At week 15, main development of external genitalia is finished.

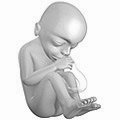
Fetus at 18 weeks after fertilization.

==== Week 21 ====
Gestational age: 20 weeks old.

Embryonic age: 18 weeks old.

- The fetus reaches a length of 20 cm (8 in).
- Lanugo covers the entire body.
- Eyebrows and eyelashes appear.
- Nails appear on fingers and toes.
- The fetus is more active with increased muscle development.
- "Quickening" usually occurs (the mother and others can feel the fetus moving).
- The fetal heartbeat can be heard with a stethoscope.

==== Week 23 ====
Gestational age: 22 weeks old.

Embryonic age: 20 weeks old.

- The fetus reaches a length of 28 cm (11 in).
- The fetus weighs about 500g.
- Eyebrows and eyelashes are well formed.
- All of the eye components are developed.
- The fetus has a hand and startle reflex.
- Footprints and fingerprints continue forming.
- Alveoli (air sacs) are forming in lungs.

==== Week 26 ====
Gestational age: 24 weeks old.

Embryonic age: Week nr 25. 24 weeks old.

- The fetus reaches a length of 32.5 cm (13 in).
- The fetus weighs about 650 g (1 lb 7 oz).
- The brain develops rapidly.
- The nervous system develops enough to control some body functions.
- The eyelids open and close.
- The cochleae are now developed, though the myelin sheaths in neural portion of the auditory system will continue to develop until 18 months after birth.
- The respiratory system, while immature, has developed to the point where gas exchange is possible.

==== Week 31 ====
Gestational age: 30 weeks old.

Embryonic age: Week nr 29. 28 weeks old.

- The fetus reaches a length of about 38–43 cm (15–17 in).
- The fetus weighs about 1.5 kg (3 lb 5 oz).
- The amount of body fat rapidly increases.
- Rhythmic breathing movements occur, but lungs are not fully mature.
- Thalamic brain connections, which mediate sensory input, form.
- Bones are fully developed, but are still soft and pliable.
- The fetus begins storing a lot of iron, calcium and phosphorus.

==== Week 35 ====
Gestational age: 34 weeks old.

Embryonic age: Week nr 33. 32 weeks old.

- The fetus reaches a length of about 40–48 cm (16–19 in).
- The fetus weighs about 2.5 to 3 kg (6 lb 10 oz)to 6 lb 12 oz).
- Lanugo begins to disappear.
- Body fat increases.
- Fingernails reach the end of the fingertips.
- A baby born at 36 weeks has a high chance of survival, but may require medical interventions.

==== Weeks 36 to 40 ====
Gestational age: 35 and 0 days until 39 weeks and 6 days old.

Embryonic age: Weeks nr 34–38. 33–37 weeks old.

- The fetus is considered full-term at the end of the 39th week of gestational age.
- It may be 48 to 53 cm (19 to 21 in) in length.
- The lanugo is gone except on the upper arms and shoulders.
- Fingernails extend beyond fingertips.
- Small breast buds are present on both sexes.
- Head hair is now coarse and thickest.

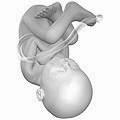
Fetus at 38 weeks after fertilization.
