= Fetal pole =

Thickening on the margin of the yolk sac of a fetus during pregnancy

The fetal pole is a thickening on the margin of the yolk sac of a fetus during pregnancy. It is usually identified at six weeks with vaginal ultrasound and at six and a half weeks with abdominal ultrasound. However, it is not unheard of for the fetal pole to not be visible until about 9 weeks. The fetal pole may be seen at 2–4 mm crown-rump length (CRL).
