= The Human Embryo =

1990 book by G.R. Dunstan

The Human Embryo: Aristotle and the Arabic and European Traditions
- Author: Canon G. R. Gunstan
- Language: English
- Publisher: University of Exeter Press
- Publication date: 1990

The Human Embryo: Aristotle and the Arabic and European Traditions is a book looking at the philosophy and religious viewpoints of human reproduction over the ages by the Reverend Canon G. R. Dunstan and published by University of Exeter Press in 1990. It specialises in the study of the human embryo both historically and from different cultural viewpoints. The largest section is devoted to the understanding of the embryo in the Middle Ages, with seven articles alone reinterpreting Dante's passages on the animation of the embryo.
