= Vitelline duct =

Narrow tube connecting the yolk sac and midgut lumen of a fetus

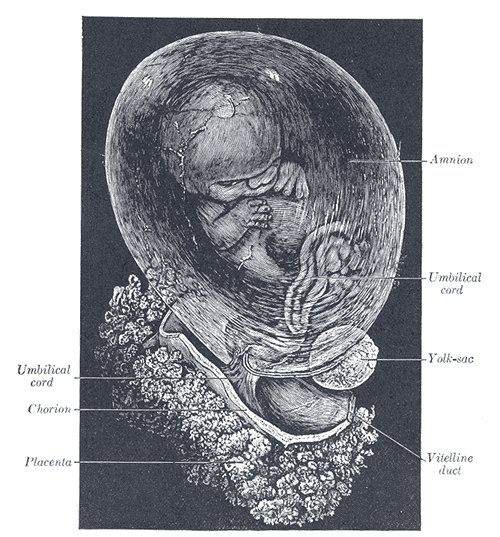
- Fetus of about eight weeks, enclosed in the amnion. (Vitelline duct labeled at lower right.)

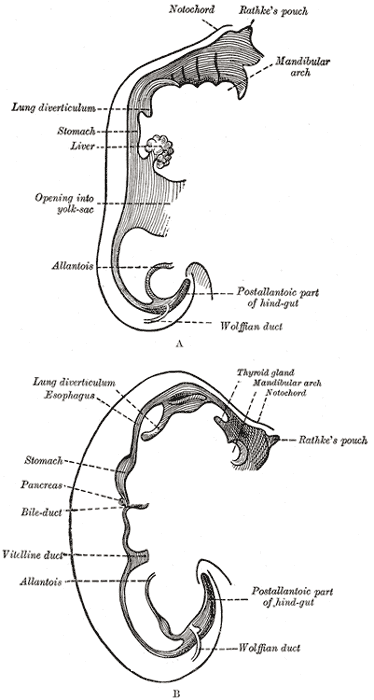
- Sketches in profile of two stages in the development of the human digestive tube. (Vitelline duct labeled on bottom image.)

Details
- Days: 28
- Precursor: Midgut, yolk sac

Identifiers
- Latin: ductus vitellinus
- MeSH: D014816

In the human embryo, the vitelline duct, also known as the vitellointestinal duct, the yolk stalk, the omphaloenteric duct, or the omphalomesenteric duct, is a long narrow tube that joins the yolk sac to the midgut lumen of the developing fetus. It appears at the end of the fourth week, when the yolk sac (also known as the umbilical vesicle) presents the appearance of a small pear-shaped vesicle.

== Function ==
=== Obliteration ===
Generally, the duct fully obliterates (narrows and disappears) during the 5–6th week of fertilization age (9th week of gestational age), but a failure of the duct to close is termed a vitelline fistula. This results in discharge of meconium from the navel (umbilicus). About two percent of fetuses exhibit a type of vitelline fistula characterized by persistence of the proximal part of the vitelline duct as a diverticulum protruding from the small intestine, Meckel's diverticulum, which is typically situated within two feet of the ileocecal junction and may be attached by a fibrous cord to the abdominal wall at the umbilicus.

=== Persistence ===
The yolk sac can be seen in the afterbirth as a small, somewhat oval-shaped body, the diameter of which varies from 1 mm to 5 mm. It is situated between the amnion and the chorion and may lie on the placenta or at a varying distance from it.

== Clinical significance ==
=== Meckel's diverticulum ===
Sometimes a narrowing of the lumen of the ileum is seen opposite the site of attachment of the duct. On this site of attachment, sometimes a pathological Meckel's diverticulum may be present.

A mnemonic used to recall details of a Meckel's diverticulum is as follows: "2 inches long, within 2 feet of ileocecal valve, 2 times as common in males than females, 2% of population, 2% symptomatic, 2 types of ectopic tissue: gastric and pancreatic". In the decades since the mnemonic was developed, further epidemiology has found the incidence of symptomatic diverticulae to be 4%, not 2%, and the incidence to be 2–5x greater in males than females, but the mnemonic is still helpful.

== Additional images ==
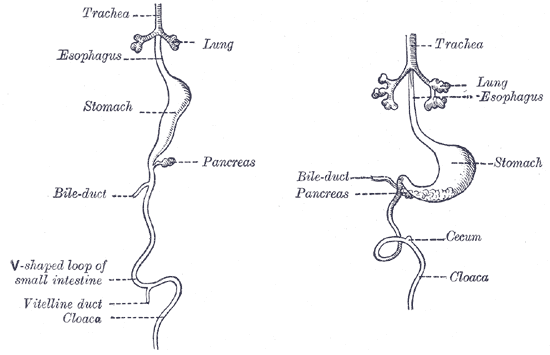
Front view of two successive stages in the development of the digestive tube.
