= Heuser's membrane =

Cells formed during embryonic development

Details
- Days: 12
- Gives rise to: extraembryonic coelom

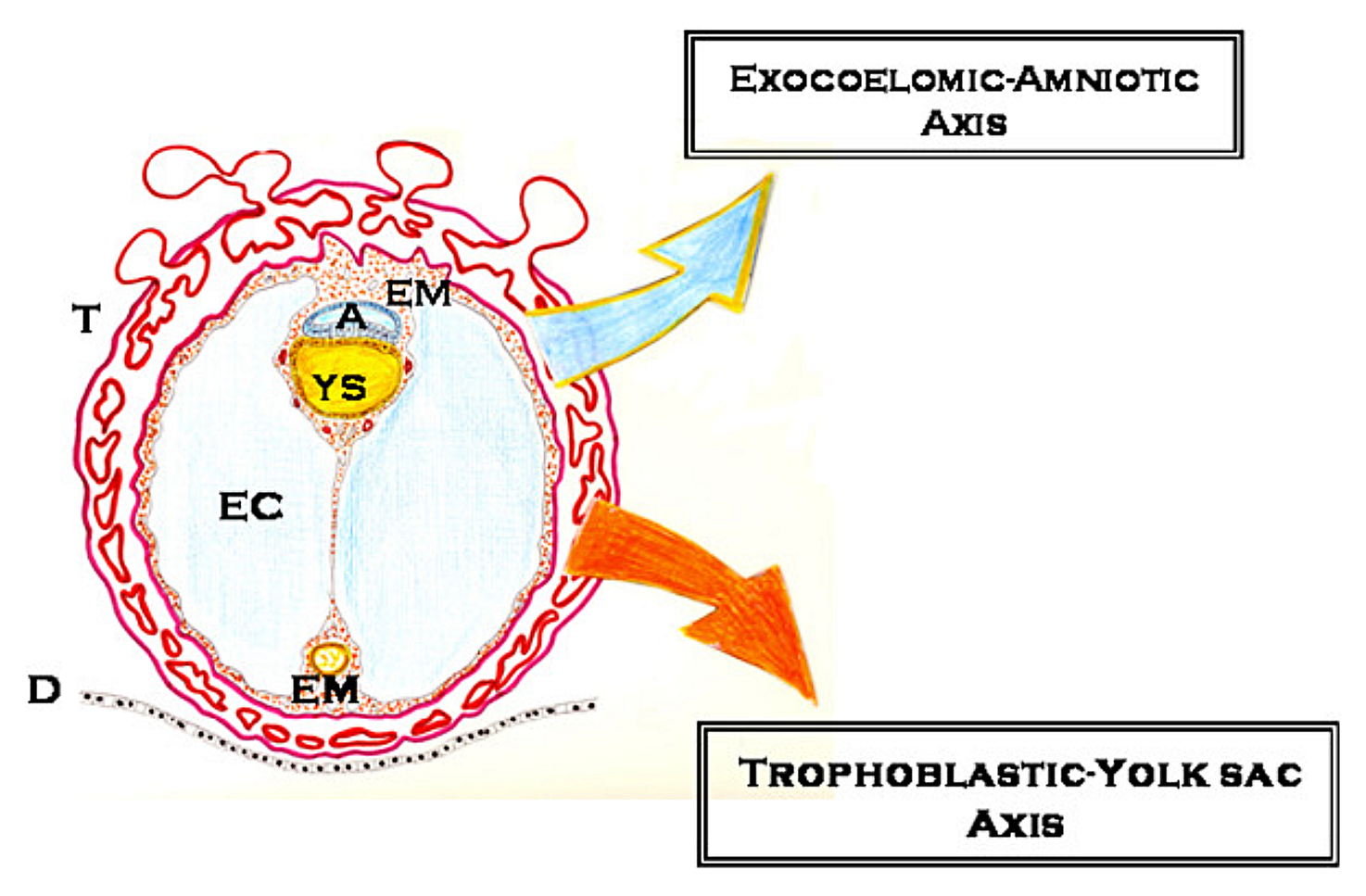
A: amnion; EC: exocoelomic cavity; EM: extraembryonic mesoderm; D: decidua; T: trophoblast; YS: secondary yolk sac.

Heuser's membrane (or the exocoelomic membrane) is a short lived combination of hypoblast cells and extracellular matrix.

At day 9-10 of embryonic development, cells from the hypoblast begin to migrate to the embryonic pole, forming a layer of cells just beneath the cytotrophoblast, called Heuser's membrane. It surrounds the exocoelomic cavity (primary yolk sac), i.e. it lines the inner surface of the cytotrophoblast. At this point, the exocoelomic cavity replaces the blastocyst cavity.

At days 11 to 12, there is further delineation of the trophoblastic cells giving rise to a layer of loosely arranged cells that inserts between Heuser's membrane and both syncytiotrophoblast and cytotrophoblast.

The Heuser's membrane cells (hypoblast cells) that migrated along the inner cytotrophoblast lining of the blastocoel, secrete an extracellular matrix along the way. Cells of the hypoblast migrate along the outer edges of this reticulum and form the extraembryonic mesoderm (splanchnic and somatic); this disrupts the extraembryonic reticulum. Soon pockets form in the reticulum, which ultimately coalesce to form the chorionic cavity (extraembryonic coelom).
