= Gestational sac =

Cavity of fluid surrounding an embryo

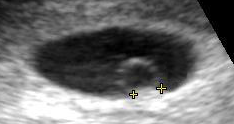
- Contents in the cavity of the uterus seen at approximately 5 weeks of gestational age by obstetric ultrasonography.

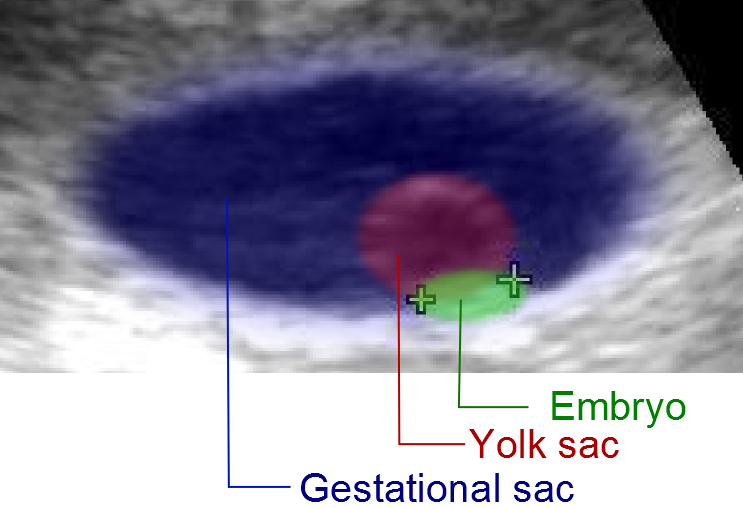
- Artificially colored, showing gestational sac, yolk sac and embryo (measuring 3 mm as the distance between the + signs).

Details
- Carnegie stage: 6a
- Days: 12
- Precursor: Heuser's membrane

Identifiers
- Latin: saccus gestationalis, coeloma extraembryonicum, cavitas chorionica
- MeSH: D058746
- TE: sac_by_E5.8.0.0.1.0.1 E5.8.0.0.1.0.1

The gestational sac is the large cavity of fluid surrounding the embryo. During early embryogenesis, it consists of the extraembryonic coelom, also called the chorionic cavity. The gestational sac is normally contained within the uterus. It is the only available structure that can be used to determine if an intrauterine pregnancy exists until the embryo can be identified.

On obstetric ultrasound, the gestational sac is a dark (anechoic) space surrounded by a white (hyperechoic) rim.

== Structure ==
The gestational sac is spherical in shape, and is usually located in the upper part (fundus) of the uterus. By approximately nine weeks of gestational age, due to folding of the trilaminar germ disc, the amniotic sac expands and occupy the majority of the volume of the gestational sac, eventually reducing the extraembryonic coelom (the gestational sac or the chorionic cavity) to a thin layer between the parietal somatopleuric and visceral splanchnopleuric layer of extraembryonic mesoderm.

=== Development ===
During embryogenesis, the extraembryonic coelom (or chorionic cavity) that constitutes the gestational sac is a portion of the conceptus consisting of a cavity between Heuser's membrane and the trophoblast.

During formation of the primary yolk sac, some of the migrating hypoblast cells differentiate into mesenchymal cells that fill the space between Heuser's membrane and the trophoblast, forming the extraembryonic mesoderm. As development progresses, small lacunae begin to form within the extraembryonic mesoderm which enlarges to become the extraembryonic coelom.

The Heuser's membrane cells (hypoblast cells) that migrated along the inner cytotrophoblast lining of the blastocoel, secrete an extracellular matrix along the way. Cells of the hypoblast migrate along the outer edges of this reticulum and form the extraembryonic mesoderm; this disrupts the extraembryonic reticulum. Soon pockets form in the reticulum, which ultimately coalesce to form the extraembryonic coelom.

The extraembryonic coelom divides the extraembryonic mesoderm into two layers: extraembryonic splanchnopleuric mesoderm, which lies adjacent to Heuser's membrane around the outside of the primary yolk sac, and extraembryonic somatopleuric mesoderm, which lies adjacent to the cytotrophoblast layer of the embryo.

The chorionic cavity is enclosed by the chorionic plate, which is composed of an inner layer of somatopleuric mesoderm and an outer layer of trophoblast cells.

== Clinical significance ==
=== Ultrasound ===
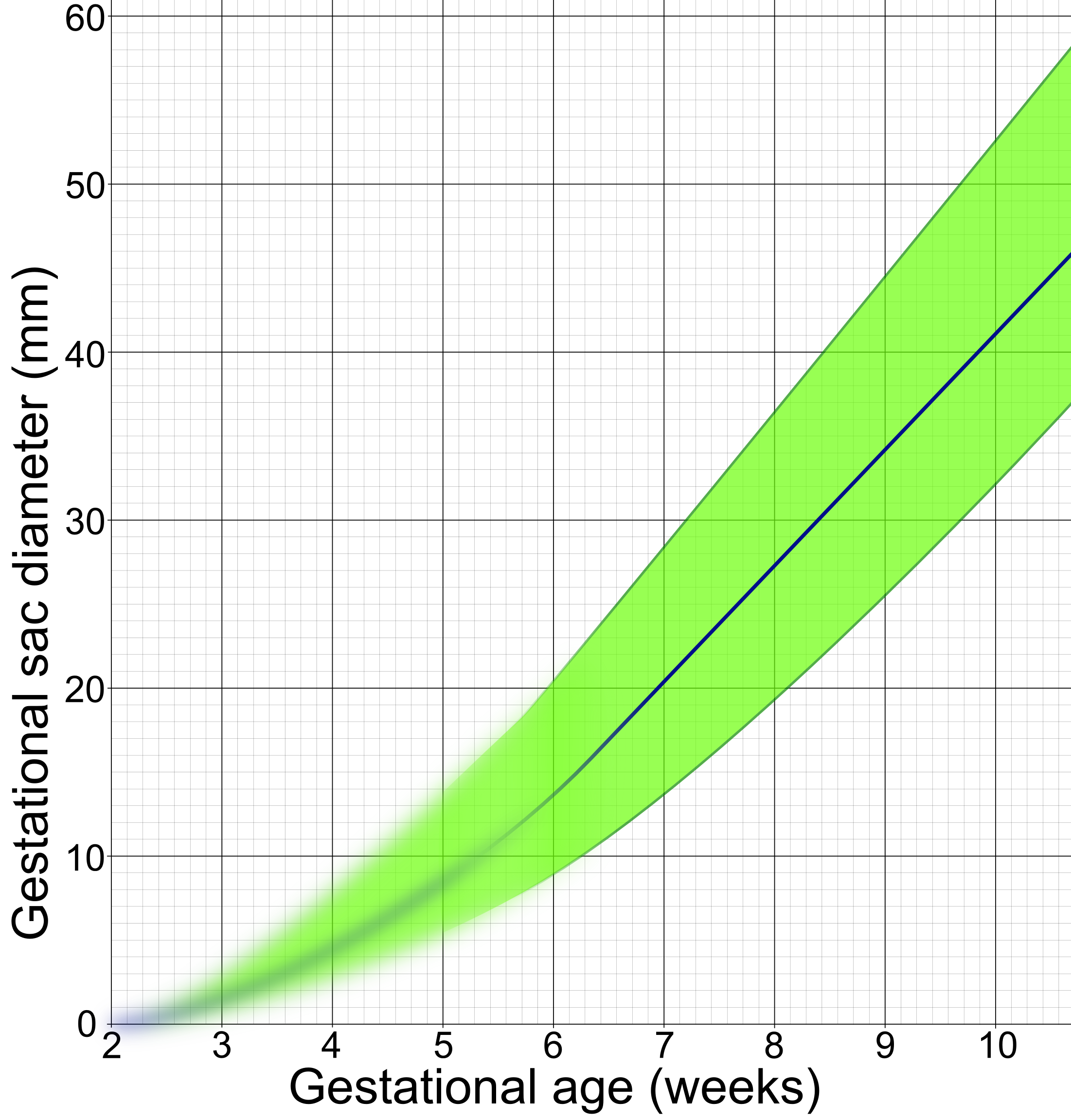
Mean gestational sac diameter by gestational age. The blue line is the mean, and the green area delimits the 5th and the 95th percentiles.

A: Gestational sac, B: Crown-rump length of embryo, C: Amniotic sac, D: Yolk sac

The mean sac diameter can effectively estimate the gestational age between 5 and 6 weeks, with an accuracy of about +/- 5 days.

The yolk sac and embryo should be readily identifiable when the gestational sac reaches a certain size — a yolk sac should be seen when the gestational sac is 20mm and a fetal pole should be seen when the gestational sac reaches 25mm.

Gestational sacs can be identified via ultrasound and are generally identified by the following four characteristics:

1. The sac has a round or elliptical shape in longitudinal and transverse views
2. The sac is surrounded by a white echogenic rim (choriodecidual reaction)
3. The sac is located in the uterine fundus
4. The sac is not implanted on the midline, but eccentrically (to one side of the uterine cavity line).

== See also ==
- Amniotic sac
- Intraembryonic coelom (involved in formation of body cavities like pleural, pericardial and peritoneal cavity)
