= Amniotic sac =

Sac in which the fetus develops in amniotes

The amniotic sac, also called the bag of waters or the membranes, is the sac in which the embryo and later fetus develops in amniotes. It is a thin but tough transparent pair of membranes that hold a developing embryo (and later fetus) until shortly before birth. The inner of these membranes, the amnion, encloses the amniotic cavity, containing the amniotic fluid and the embryo. The outer membrane, the chorion, contains the amnion and is part of the placenta. On the outer side, the amniotic sac is connected to the yolk sac, the allantois, and via the umbilical cord, the placenta.

The yolk sac, amnion, chorion, and allantois are the four extraembryonic membranes that lie outside of the embryo and are involved in providing nutrients and protection to the developing embryo. They form from the inner cell mass; the first to form is the yolk sac followed by the amnion which grows over the developing embryo. The amnion remains an important extraembryonic membrane throughout prenatal development. The third membrane is the allantois, and the fourth is the chorion which surrounds the embryo after about a month and eventually fuses with the amnion.

Amniocentesis is a medical procedure where fluid from the sac is sampled during fetal development, between 15 and 20 weeks of pregnancy, to be used in prenatal diagnosis of chromosomal abnormalities and fetal infections.

== Structure ==
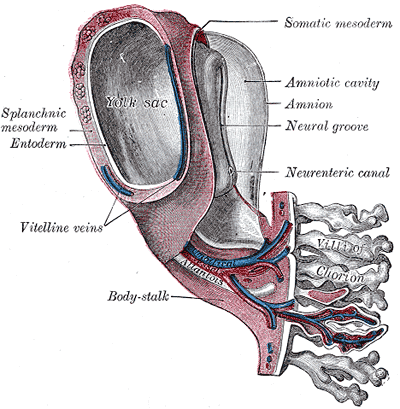
Amniotic cavity in human embryo 1.3 mm. long

The amniotic cavity is the closed sac between the embryo and the amnion, containing the amniotic fluid. The amniotic cavity is formed by the fusion of the parts of the amniotic fold, which first makes its appearance at the cephalic extremity and subsequently at the caudal end and sides of the embryo. As the amniotic fold rises and fuses over the dorsal aspect of the embryo, the amniotic cavity is formed.

=== Development ===
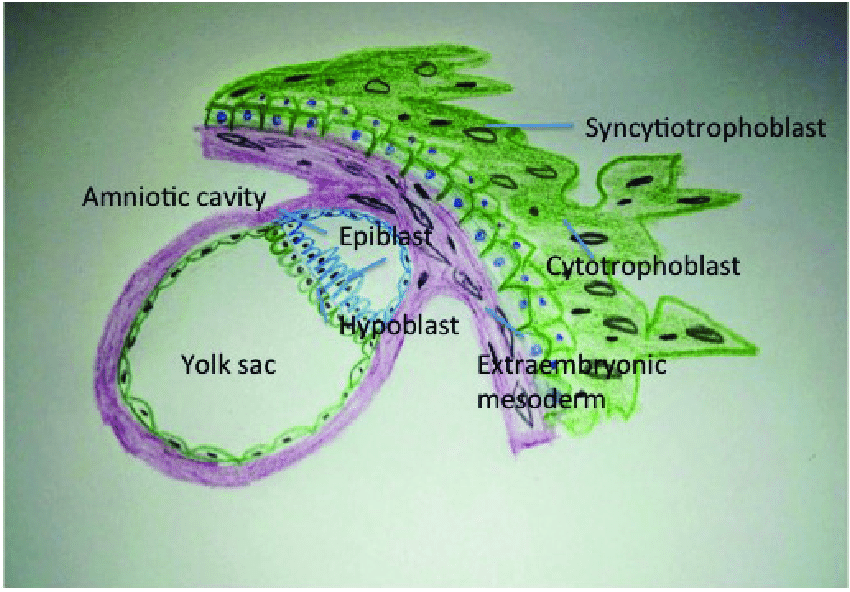
Bilaminar embryonic disc and amniotic cavity at implantation site

At the beginning of the second week, a cavity appears within the inner cell mass, and when it enlarges, it becomes the amniotic cavity. The floor of the amniotic cavity is formed by the epiblast. Epiblast migrates between the epiblastic disc and trophoblast. In this way the epiblastic cells migrate between the embryoblast and trophoblast. The floor is formed by the epiblast which later on transforms to ectoderm while the remaining cells which are present between the embryoblast and trophoblast are called amnioblasts (flattened cells). These cells are also derived from epiblast which is transformed into ectoderm.

The amniotic cavity is surrounded by an extraembryonic membrane, called the amnion. As the implantation of the blastocyst progresses, a small space appears in the embryoblast, which is the primordium of the amniotic cavity. Soon, amniogenic (amnion-forming cells) called amnioblasts separate from the epiblast and line the amnion, which encloses the amniotic cavity.

The epiblast forms the floor of the amniotic cavity and is continuous peripherally with the amnion. The hypoblast forms the roof of the exocoelomic cavity and is continuous with the thin exocoelomic membrane. This membrane along with hypoblast forms the primary yolk sac. The embryonic disc now lies between the amniotic cavity and the primary yolk sac. Cells from the yolk sac endoderm form a layer of connective tissue, the extraembryonic mesoderm, which surrounds the amnion and yolk sac.

=== Birth ===
If, after birth, the complete amniotic sac or big parts of the membrane remain coating the newborn, this is called a caul.

When seen in the light, the amniotic sac is shiny and very smooth, but tough.

Once the baby is pushed out of the mother's uterus, the umbilical cord, placenta, and amniotic sac are pushed out in the afterbirth.

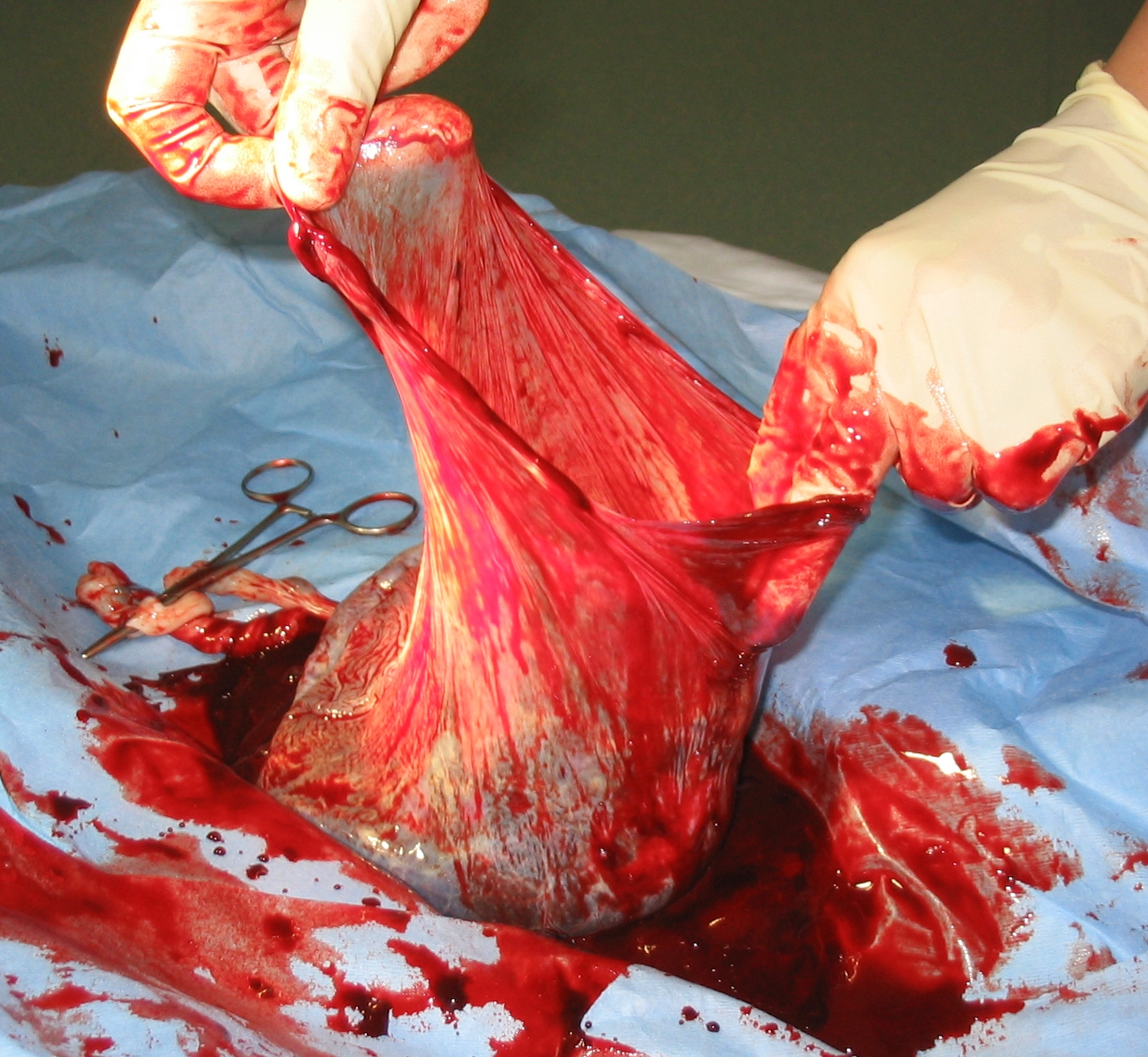
The amniotic sac opened during afterbirth examination

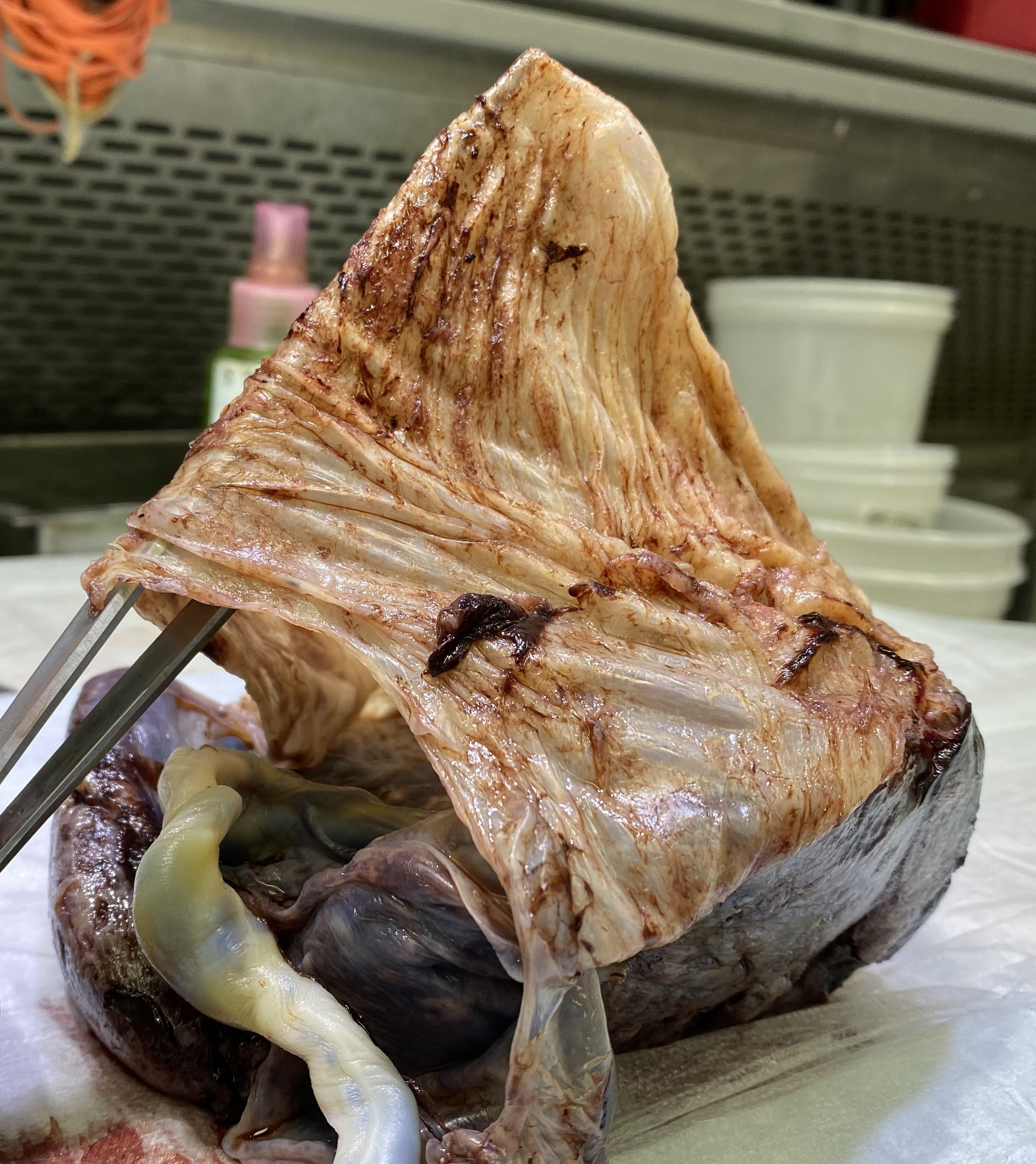
Placenta with attached fetal membranes (ruptured at the margin at the left in the image).

== Function ==
The amniotic sac and its filling provide a liquid that surrounds and cushions the fetus. It is a site of exchange of essential substances, such as oxygen, between the umbilical cord and the fetus. It allows the fetus to move freely within the walls of the uterus. Buoyancy is also provided.

== Clinical significance ==
Chorioamnionitis is inflammation of the amniotic sac (chorio- + amnion + -itis), usually because of infection. It is a risk factor for neonatal sepsis.

During labor, the amniotic sac must break so that the child can be born. This is known as rupture of membranes (ROM). Normally, it occurs spontaneously at full term either during or at the beginning of labor. A premature rupture of membranes (PROM) is a rupture of the amnion that occurs prior to the onset of labor. An artificial rupture of membranes (AROM), also known as an amniotomy, may be clinically performed using an amnihook or amnicot in order to induce or to accelerate labour.

The amniotic sac has to be punctured to perform amniocentesis. This is fairly routine procedure, but can lead to infection of the amniotic sac in a very small number of cases. Infection more commonly arises vaginally.

== See also ==
- Gestational sac
