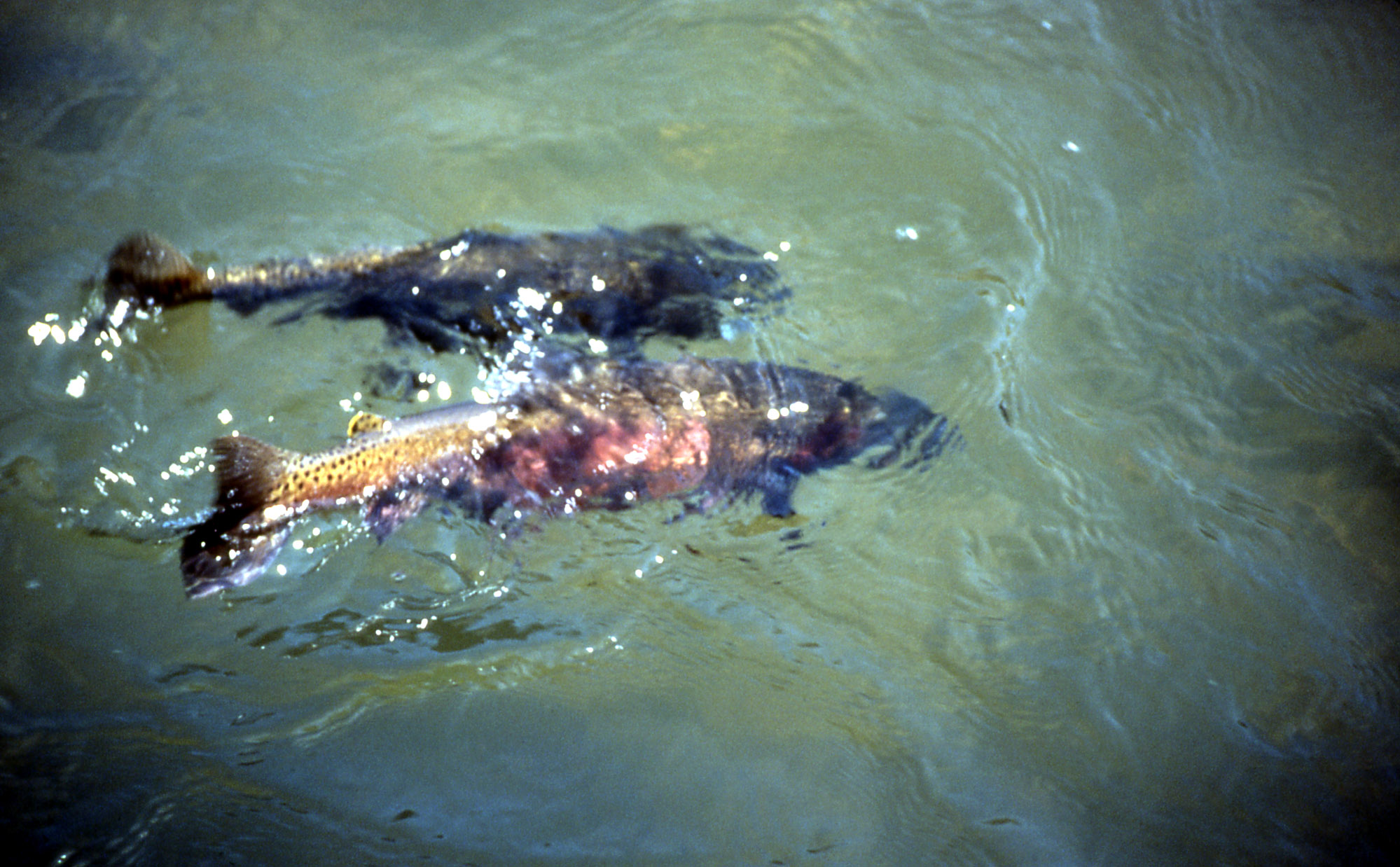
- Trout spawning showing typical anamniote external fertilization
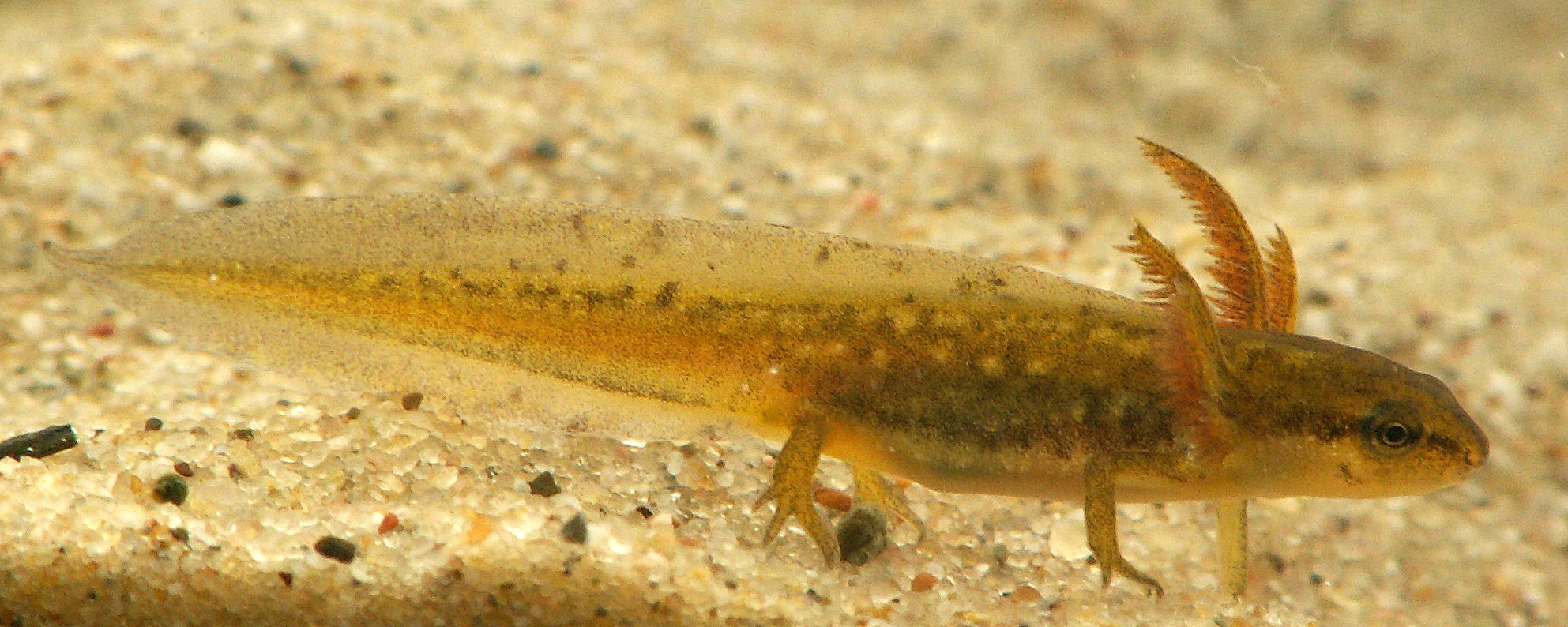
- Anamniotes have a distinct larval stage, such as in the smooth newt.

Scientific classification
- Kingdom: Animalia
- Phylum: Chordata
- Clade: Olfactores
- Subphylum: Vertebrata

Groups included
- All non-amniote vertebrates: "Agnatha"; †"Placodermi"; †"Acanthodii"; Chondrichthyes; Osteichthyes; Actinopterygii; Sarcopterygii (excluding amniotes); Amphibia

= Anamniotes =

Group of vertebrates consisting of amphibians and fish

The anamniotes are an informal group of vertebrates comprising all fish and amphibians, which lay their eggs in aquatic environments. They are distinguished from the amniotes (reptiles, birds and mammals), which can reproduce on dry land either by laying shelled eggs or by carrying fertilized eggs within the female. Older sources, particularly before the 20th century, may refer to anamniotes as "lower vertebrates" and amniotes as "higher vertebrates", based on the antiquated idea of the evolutionary great chain of being.

The name "anamniote" is a back-formation word created by adding the prefix an- to the word amniote, which in turn refers to the amnion, an extraembryonic membrane present during the amniotes' embryonic development. It serves as a biochemical barrier that shields the embryo from environmental fluctuations by regulating the oxygen, carbon dioxide and metabolic waste exchanges and secreting a cushioning fluid. As the name suggests, anamniote embryos lack an amnion during embryonic development, and therefore rely on the presence of external water to provide oxygen and help dilute and excrete waste products (particularly ammonia) via diffusion in order for the embryo to complete development without being intoxicated by their own metabolites. This means anamniotes are almost always dependent on an aqueous (or at least very moist) environment for reproduction and are thus restricted to spawning in or near water bodies. They are also highly sensitive to chemical and temperature variation in the surrounding water, and are also more vulnerable to egg predation and parasitism.

During their life cycle, all anamniote classes pass through a completely aquatic egg stage, as well as an aquatic larval stage during which all hatchlings are gill-dependent and morphologically resemble tiny finless fish (known as a fry or a tadpole for fish and amphibians, respectively), before metamorphosizing into juvenile and adult forms (which might be aquatic, semiaquatic or even terrestrial), thus indicating their physiological homology.

== Anamniote traits ==
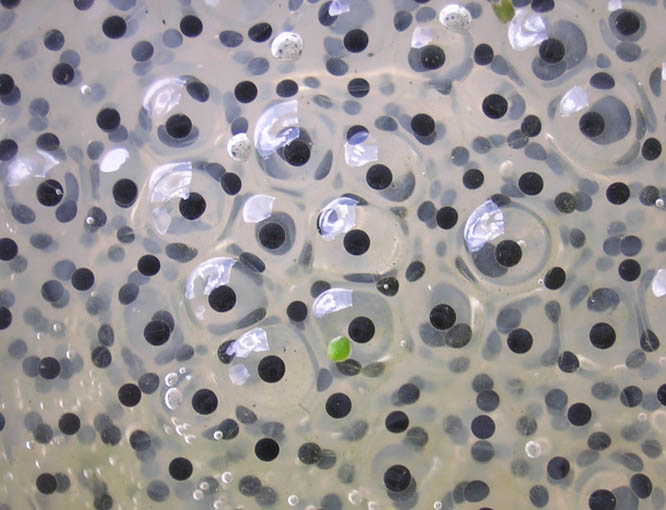
Anamniote eggs from a frog.

The group is characterized by retaining the primitive vertebrate condition in several traits:

- Absence of an amnion
- Absence or rudimentary condition of the allantois
- Permeable skin allowing diffusion of water and gases directly through the skin.
- Presence at some period of life of gills.

== History of discovery ==
The features unifying the anamniotes was first noted by Thomas Henry Huxley in 1863, who coined the phrase Ichtioid or Ichthyopsida ("fish-face") for the group. It is a taxonomic classification just below the level of Vertebrata, though Huxley presented the Ichthyopsida as an informal unit and never ventured to forward a Linnaean rank for the group. The term Ichthyopsida means fish-face or fish-like as opposed to the Sauropsida or lizard-face animals (reptiles and birds) and the mammals. The group representing an evolutionary grade rather than a clade, the term anamniote is now used as an informal way of denoting the physical property of the group, rather than as a systematic unit.
