= Conceptus =

Embryo plus its appendages

Identifiers
- TE: E1.0.2.6.4.0.3

A conceptus (from Latin: concipere, to conceive) is an embryo and its appendages (adnexa), the associated membranes, placenta, and umbilical cord; the products of conception or, more broadly, "the product of conception at any point between fertilization and birth." The conceptus includes all structures that develop from the zygote, both embryonic and extraembryonic. It includes the embryo as well as the embryonic part of the placenta and its associated membranes: amnion, chorion (gestational sac), allantois and yolk sac.
