= Chorioallantoic membrane =

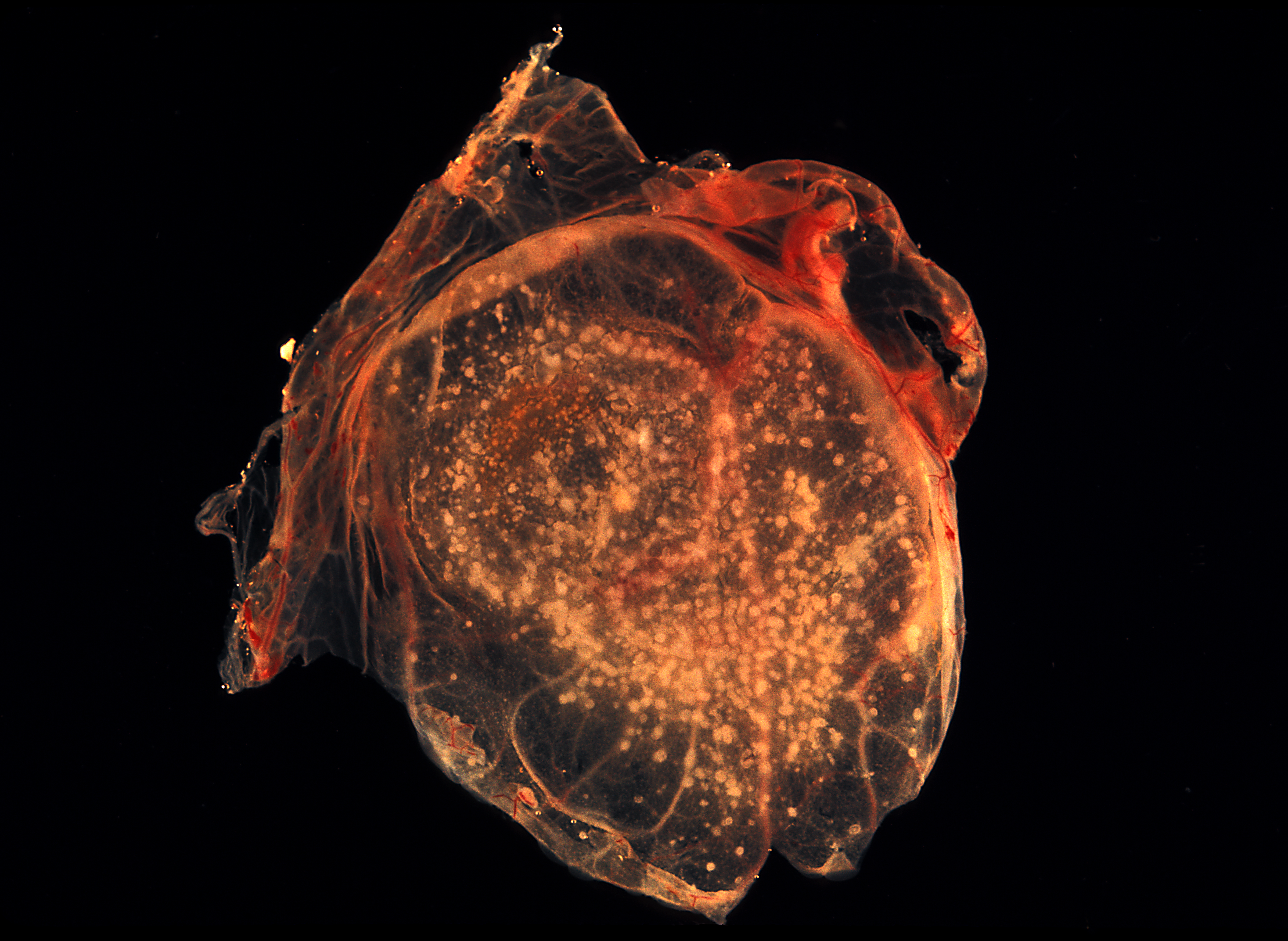
- The chorioallantoic membrane of a developing chick covered with Smallpox virus pocks

Identifiers
- MeSH: D049033

The chorioallantoic membrane (CAM), also known as the chorioallantois, is a highly vascularized membrane found in the eggs of certain amniotes like birds and reptiles. It is formed by the fusion of the mesodermal layers of two extra-embryonic membranes – the chorion and the allantois. It is the avian homologue of the mammalian placenta. It is the outermost extra-embryonic membrane which lines the non-vascular egg shell membrane.

== Structure ==
The chorioallantoic membrane is composed of three layers. The first is the chorionic epithelium that is the external layer present immediately below the shell membrane. It consists of epithelial cells that arise from chorionic ectoderm. The second is the intermediate mesodermal layer that consists of mesenchymal tissue formed by the fusion of the mesodermal layer of the chorion and the mesodermal layer of the allantois. This layer is highly vascularized and rich in stromal components. The third is the allantoic epithelium that consists of epithelial cells arising from the allantoic endoderm. It forms a part of the wall of the allantoic sac.

Both the epithelial layers are separated from the mesodermal layer by basement membranes.

== Function ==
The Chorioallantoic membrane performs the following functions:

The CAM functions as the site of gaseous exchange for oxygen and carbon dioxide between the growing embryo and the environment. Blood capillaries and sinuses are found in the intermediate mesodermal layer allows close contact (within 0.2 μm) with air found in pores of the shell membrane of the egg.

The chorionic epithelial layer contains the calcium transporting region of the CAM, and thus is responsible for the transport of calcium ions from the egg shell into the embryo for the purpose of ossification of the bones of the developing embryo. The CAM also helps in maintaining the acid-base homeostasis in the embryo. Finally the allantoic epithelium serves a barrier to the allantoic cavity, and acts in a selectively permeable manner by permitting the absorption of water and electrolytes, as well as maintains a barrier against the toxins and waste materials stored inside the allantoic cavity.

== Development ==
The development of the CAM is similar to that of the allantois in mammals. Its growth starts from day 3 of embryonic development. Development of the allantois occurs extra embryonically from the ventral wall of the endodermal hindgut. Partial fusion of the chorion and allantois occurs between days 5 and 6. By day 10, there is an extensive formation of capillary network. The complete differentiation of the CAM is complete by day 13.

== Cultivation protocols ==
Chorioallantoic membranes can be cultivated either outside (ex-ovo) or inside the shell (in-ovo).

=== Ex-ovo ===
Here, the embryo is grown outside of the shell. In this method, the eggs are first kept in inside a humidified incubator for up to a period of 3 days, to ensure that the position of the embryo is opposite to the position where the egg will be subsequently cracked. A small hole is made on the side of the air chamber to equilibrate the pressure, followed by the cracking of the egg on a petri-dish.

This method is ideal for visualizing the growing embryo and their manipulation without limitations in accessing the embryo during the different stages of development. However the process requires aseptic conditions. There are also problems associated with the handling of the embryo, as the yolk membrane is prone to rupture both during and after the culture.

=== In-ovo ===
Here, the embryo is grown within the confines of the egg shell. In this method, fertilized eggs are rotated inside an incubator for three days in order to prevent the embryo from sticking to the membranes of the shell. A hole is then created on the eggshell and wrapped with a film to prevent dehydration and infections. The egg is then maintained in a static position until further use. This step prevents the CAM from sticking to the shell membrane. At day 7 post-fertilisation, the hole is extended in order to access the CAM.

This method offers several advantages over the ex-vivo method as the physiological environment for the developing embryo remains virtually unchanged. It is easier to maintain sterility as well the integrity of the CAM and the embryo when they are present inside the shell. However good technical skills are required for this method. The presence of the shell around the developing embryo makes access to the embryo difficult. There are also limitations in the observing and imaging of the developing embryo.

== Applications ==
CAM provides several features such as ease of access, and the rapid development of the membrane structure, presence of an immunodeficient environment, ease of visualization for imaging techniques ranging from microscopic to PET scans. Thus, it makes for a suitable model for a number of research applications in the field of biological and biomedical research:

- Vascular development and angiogenesis.
- Xenograft studies.
- Study of tumour growth and differentiation.
- Wound repair studies.
- Toxicology studies.
- Eye Irritation studies
- Nanomaterials assessments.
- Drug delivery.
- Study of molecules affecting with angiogenic and anti-angiogenic activities.
- Culturing of viruses like Herpes Simplex Virus, etc.
- Drug screening studies.
- Radiotherapy related studies.
- Allergenicity and toxicity studies.
- Helminth cultivation.
- Oncological investigations.

== Advantages ==
The advantages of using CAM are:

- It is easy to use as compared to other animal models.
- Assays can be visualized real time using very simple to highly complex visualizing techniques.
- Rapid vascular growth.
- Cost effective, easy to access.
- The circulatory system is completely accessible making the delivery of intravenous molecules easy.
- Assays take relatively less time.
- Easily reproducible and reliable.

== Disadvantages ==
Despite the numerous advantages, there are a number of disadvantages associated with the use CAMs:

- Sensitivity to modifications in environmental conditions.
- Limited availability of reagents like antibodies due to avian origin.
- Non-specific inflammatory reaction after 15 days of development.
- Difficulty of distinguishing the formation of new capillaries from the already existing vascular network.
- Differences in metabolism of drugs as compared to mammals.
