= Cutis =

Cutis may refer to several unrelated biological structures:

- Cutis (anatomy), the outermost layers of skin
- Cutis (mycology), a type of pileipellis in a fungus

== Other ==
- Cutis (journal), an academic journal of dermatology published by Frontline Medical Communications
- Cutiş, a village in Almașu Commune, Sălaj County, Romania
