= Fetal membranes =

Amnion and chorion which surround and protect a developing fetus

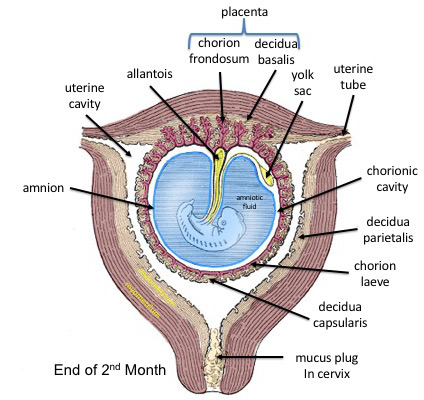
- Fetal membranes at end of second month with chorion shown in its two subdivisions

Details

Identifiers
- Latin: adnexa fetalia
- TE: membranes_by_E6.0.2.0.0.0.1 E6.0.2.0.0.0.1

The fetal membranes are the four extraembryonic membranes associated with the developing embryo and fetus in humans and other mammals. They are the amnion, chorion, allantois, and yolk sac. The amnion and the chorion are the chorioamniotic membranes that make up the amniotic sac, which surrounds and protects the embryo. The fetal membranes are four of six accessory organs developed by the conceptus that are not part of the embryo itself; the other two are the placenta and the umbilical cord.

== Structure ==
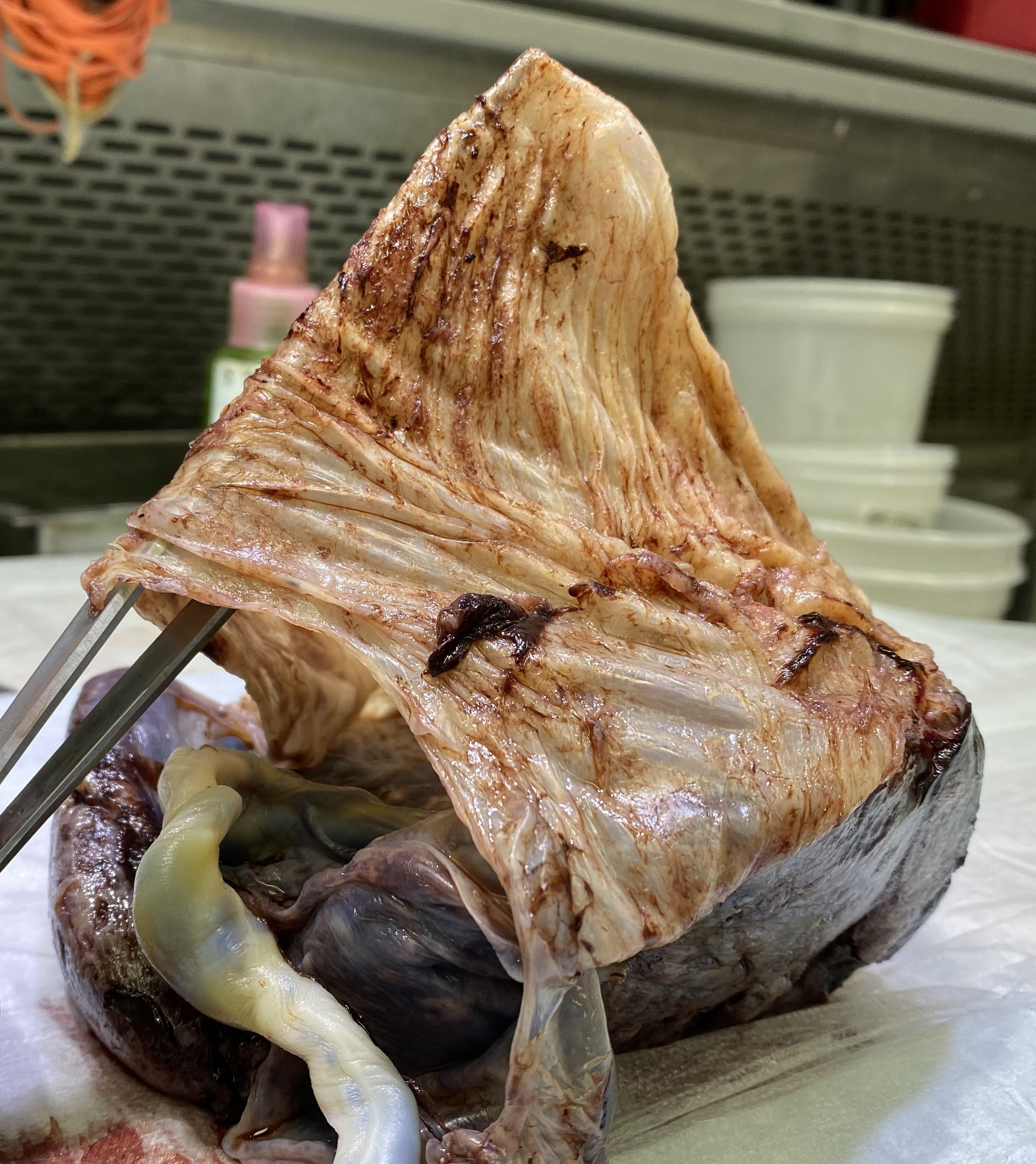
Placenta shown with attached fetal membranes

The fetal membranes surround the developing embryo and form the fetal-maternal interface. The fetal membranes are derived from the trophoblast layer (outer layer of cells) of the implanting blastocyst. The trophoblast layer differentiates into amnion and the chorion, which then comprise the fetal membranes. The amnion is the innermost layer and, therefore, contacts the amniotic fluid, the fetus and the umbilical cord. The internal pressure of the amniotic fluid causes the amnion to be passively attached to the chorion. The chorion functions to separate the amnion from the maternal decidua and uterus. The placenta develops from the chorion of the embryo and the uterine tissue of the mother.

=== Development of the fetal membranes ===
Initially, the amnion is separated from the chorion by chorionic fluid. The fusion of the amnion and chorion is completed in the human at the 12th week of development.

=== Microanatomy ===
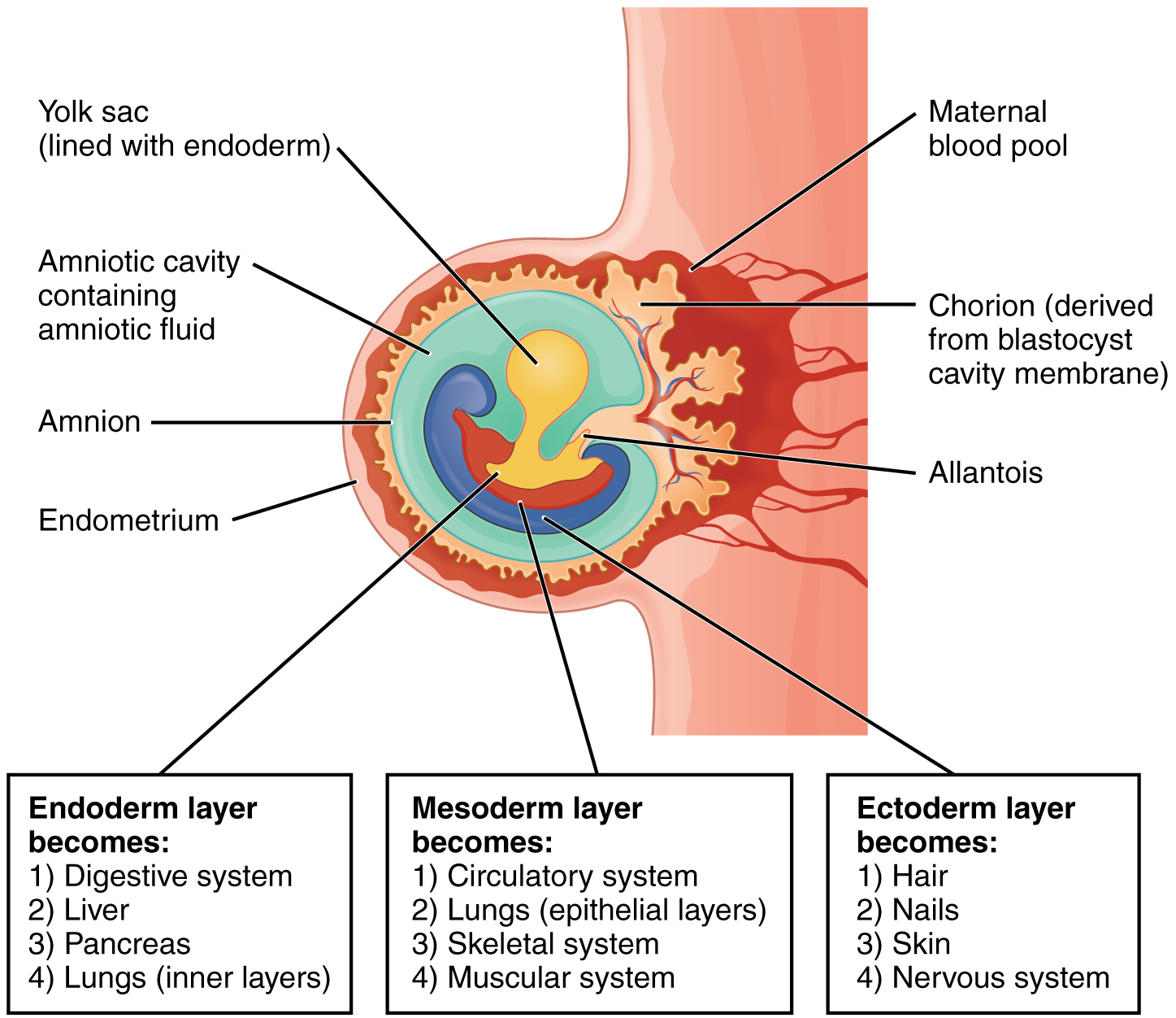
Fetal membranes illustrated at week 3 following gastrulation

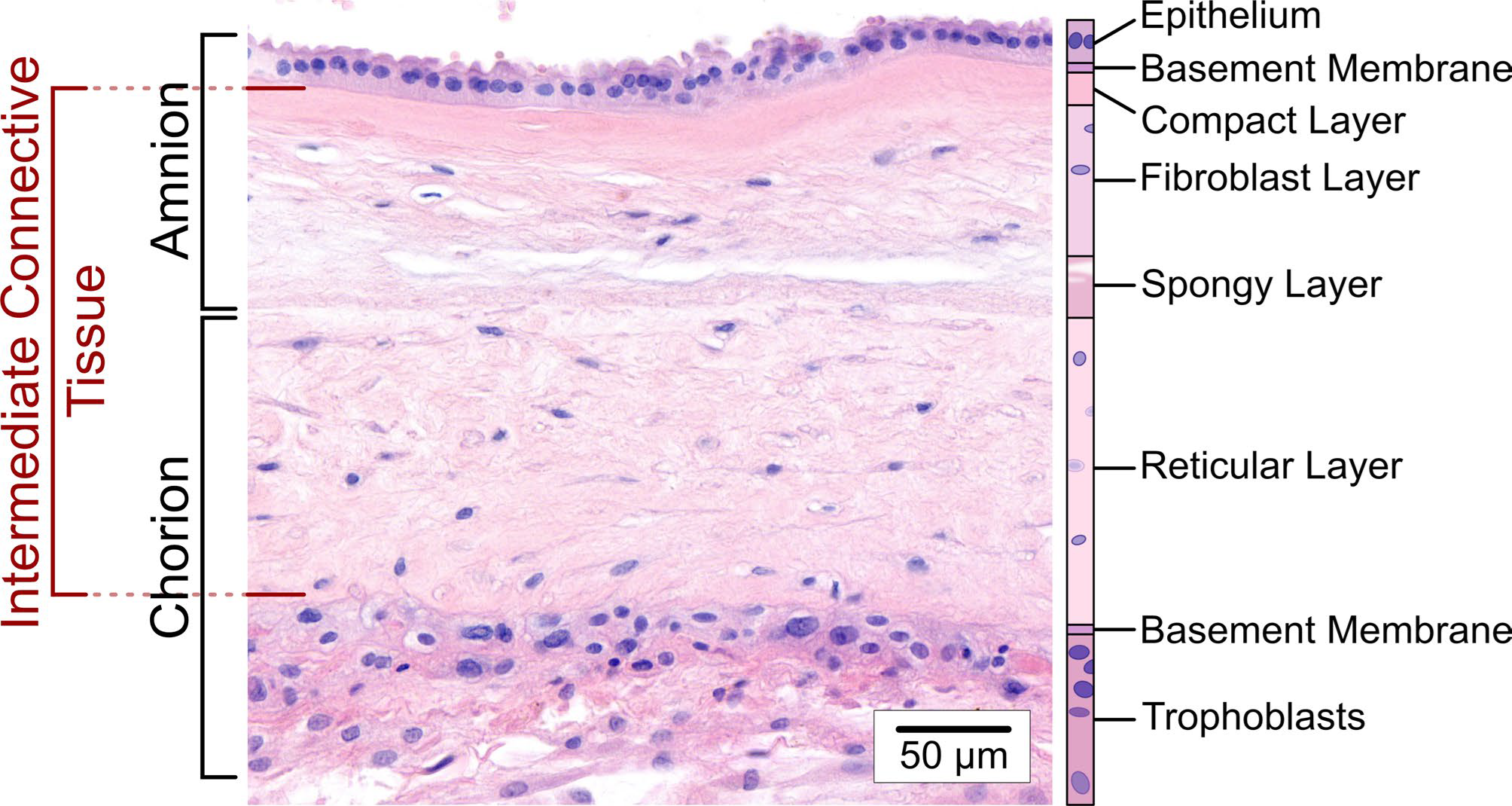
H&E-stained section of fetal membranes obtained following primary cesarean delivery, showing the layers of the amnion and chorion. The amnion comprises a single-layered epithelium, basement membrane, compact layer, fibroblast layer, and spongy layer. The chorion comprises a reticular layer, basement membrane, and trophoblast layer. The collagen-rich extracellular matrix between the amniotic and chorionic basement membranes is collectively termed the intermediate connective tissue.

From inside to outside, the fetal membranes consist of amnion and chorion. In addition, parts of decidua are often attached to the outside of the chorion.

==== Amnion ====
The amnion is avascular, meaning it does not contain its own blood vessels. Therefore, it must obtain necessary nutrients and oxygen from nearby chorionic and amniotic fluid, and fetal surface vessels. The amnion is characterised by cuboidal and columnar epithelial layers. The columnar cells are located in the vicinity of the placenta, whereas the cuboidal cells are found in the periphery. During early pregnancy, the amnionic epithelium is sparsely covered in microvilli, which increase in number throughout pregnancy. The function of this microvillous surface is associated with a densely-packed glycocalix with anionic binding sites; these are thought to be involved with intra-amnionic lipid synthesis. This amnionic epithelium is connected to a basement membrane, which is then attached by filaments to a connective tissue layer.

==== Chorion ====
The chorionic membrane is a fibrous tissue layer containing the fetal blood vessels. Chorionic villi form on the outer surface of the chorion, which maximise surface area for contact with maternal blood. The chorionic villi are involved in fetal-maternal exchange.

==== Yolk sac ====
The yolk sac is a membranous sac attached to an embryo, formed by cells of the hypoblast layer of the bilaminar embryonic disc. This is alternatively called the umbilical vesicle. In humans, the yolk sac is important in early embryonic blood supply.

==== Allantois ====
The human allantois is a caudal out-pouching of the yolk sac, which becomes surrounded by the mesodermal connecting stalk or body-stalk. The vasculature of the body-stalk develops into umbilical arteries that carry deoxygenated blood to the placenta. It is externally continuous with the proctodeum and internally continuous with the cloaca. The embryonic allantois becomes the fetal urachus, which connects the fetal bladder (developed from cloaca) to the yolk sac. The urachus removes nitrogenous waste from the fetal bladder. After birth the urachus is closed, and becomes the median umbilical ligament.

== Function ==
The fetal membrane surrounds the fetus during the gestational period and ensures maintenance of pregnancy to delivery, protection of the fetus as well as being critical in maintaining the conditions necessary for fetal health.

=== Barrier function ===
The fetal membranes separate maternal tissue from fetal tissue at a basic mechanical level. The fetal membrane is composed of a thick cellular chorion covering a thin amnion composed of dense collagen fibrils. The amnion is in contact with the amniotic fluid and ensures structural integrity of the sac due to its mechanical strength. The underlying chorion is fused to the decidua at the maternal-fetal interface. This interaction is vital in controlling the local immune systems which in turn is vital for maintaining a semi-allogeneic fetus. At the end of gestation, a 'weak zone' develops in the fetal membrane overlying the cervix due to collage remodelling. This eventually leads to rupture of the fetal membrane and the onset of labour.

=== Signalling of fetal maturation and parturition ===
As pregnancy advances to term, the fetal membranes undergo weakening. The amnion is vital in the synthesis of prostaglandins which reach the myometrium and create and initiate parturition. The chorion expresses chemicals that balance synthesis and metabolism of these prostaglandins to ensure that the myometrium is not activated pre-term. Prostaglandin E2 is thought to be synthesized by cells in the amnion and is essential in dilation of the cervix at the initiation of parturition. Glucocorticoids have been implicated in fetal maturation, regulation of immune response and many other pregnancy associated changes. As well as its function in parturition, Prostaglandin E2 is vital for fetal lung maturation. Additionally, there is an abundance of 11β-hydroxysteroid dehydrogenase 1 expressed in the foetal membranes. This enzyme converts biologically inactive cortisone into active cortisol, another chemical vital for fetal maturation and labour initiation.

== Pathophysiology ==
Preterm births (births taking place before 37 weeks) can be the result of a number of causes such as, in utero infection, inflammation, vascular disease and uterine overdistension. The risk of spontaneous preterm birth is increased by a previous preterm birth, black race, periodontal diseases and low maternal body-mass index. Key indicators of preterm birth are short cervical length and a raised cervical-vaginal fetal fibronectin concentration.

Pathophysiology of the fetal membranes, such as microfractures, senescence of cells in the fetal membrane and inflammation can lead to an increased chance of preterm premature rupture of the fetal membranes (pPROM).

=== Microfractures of the fetal membranes ===
Throughout gestation the fetal membranes undergo remodeling to allow for the increase in size of the uterus. The remodeling of the fetal membranes occurs at both the level of the cells and the extracellular matrix (ECM). Structural abnormalities such as areas of where collagen has degraded, known as microfractures, have been observed in the amniotic membrane layer.

Microfractures are characterised by:

- Alterations to or shedding of the epithelial cells of the amnion layer
- Basement membrane damage or degradation
- Cells in the ECM migrating
- The presence of tunnels from the basement membrane to the spongy layer of the amnion.

Microfractures of the fetal membranes are seen in pregnancies where pPROM has occurred. It has been suggested that the presence of more fetal membrane microfractures may mean the fetal membranes may be predisposed for preterm rupture.

=== Inflammation and senescence of the fetal membranes ===
Inflammation of the fetal membranes is called chorioamnionitis. Balanced inflammation is an important factor in maintaining fetal membranes by regulating the remodeling. However, if the inflammatory response increases above this level it can have dangerous and potentially fatal effects for the mother and child. These elevated levels of inflammatory molecules in the fetal membrane is called 'sterile inflammation'. Sterile inflammation can be caused by both microbial infection and non-infectious factors, such as senescence of fetal membranes. Senescence is associated with the aging of actively cycling and dividing cells. As the fetal membrane cells proliferate during remodelling, the telomeres (short length or non-coding DNA on the end of chromosomes that protect essential coding DNA from degradation during replication) shorten as chromosomes can not be copied end-to-end fully. Once the telomeres have reached a critical length the cell can no longer divide and can hence cause telomere-dependent replicative senescence. This should occur naturally at term (37 weeks), as it is an important factor to increase the inflammatory environment in the uterus to initiate parturition. However, fetal membrane senescence can be accelerated by oxidative stress and hence, stimulate sterile inflammation to occur prior to term; consequently, causing preterm birth.

== See also ==
- Reichert's membrane
