= Choriogenesis =

Formation of the chorion, an outer membrane of the placenta

In developmental biology, choriogenesis is the formation of the chorion, an outer membrane of the placenta that eventually forms chorionic villi that allow the transfer of blood and nutrients from mother to fetus.

== Influence on monozygotic twins ==
Identical twins have identical genomes in the immediate aftermath of twinning. About two-thirds of monozygotic twins share the same placenta, arising by cleavage before the fourth day of development; the other third have separate placentas because cleavage has taken place after the fourth day after choriogenesis has begun.

Placentas vary with respect to the transport of nutrients and hormones, a variance that may influence epigenesis. For example, the pattern of X chromosome inactivation is affected by placental status. There is a weak link between variance in IQ test findings and chorion type. A study in 1978 shows that white monochorionic identical twins display less IQ variance one from another than do white dichorionic identical twins, although similar results could not be repeated with black twins. There is weak evidence that monozygotic twins sharing a placenta have a higher concordance rate for schizophrenia than monozygotic twins with separate placentas. Sharing a placenta increases the risk for infection, and infection in pregnancy has been shown to be a risk factor for schizophrenia. Equally striking is evidence for increasing difference in genomic expression between identical twins as they are once again implicating environmental intercession.
