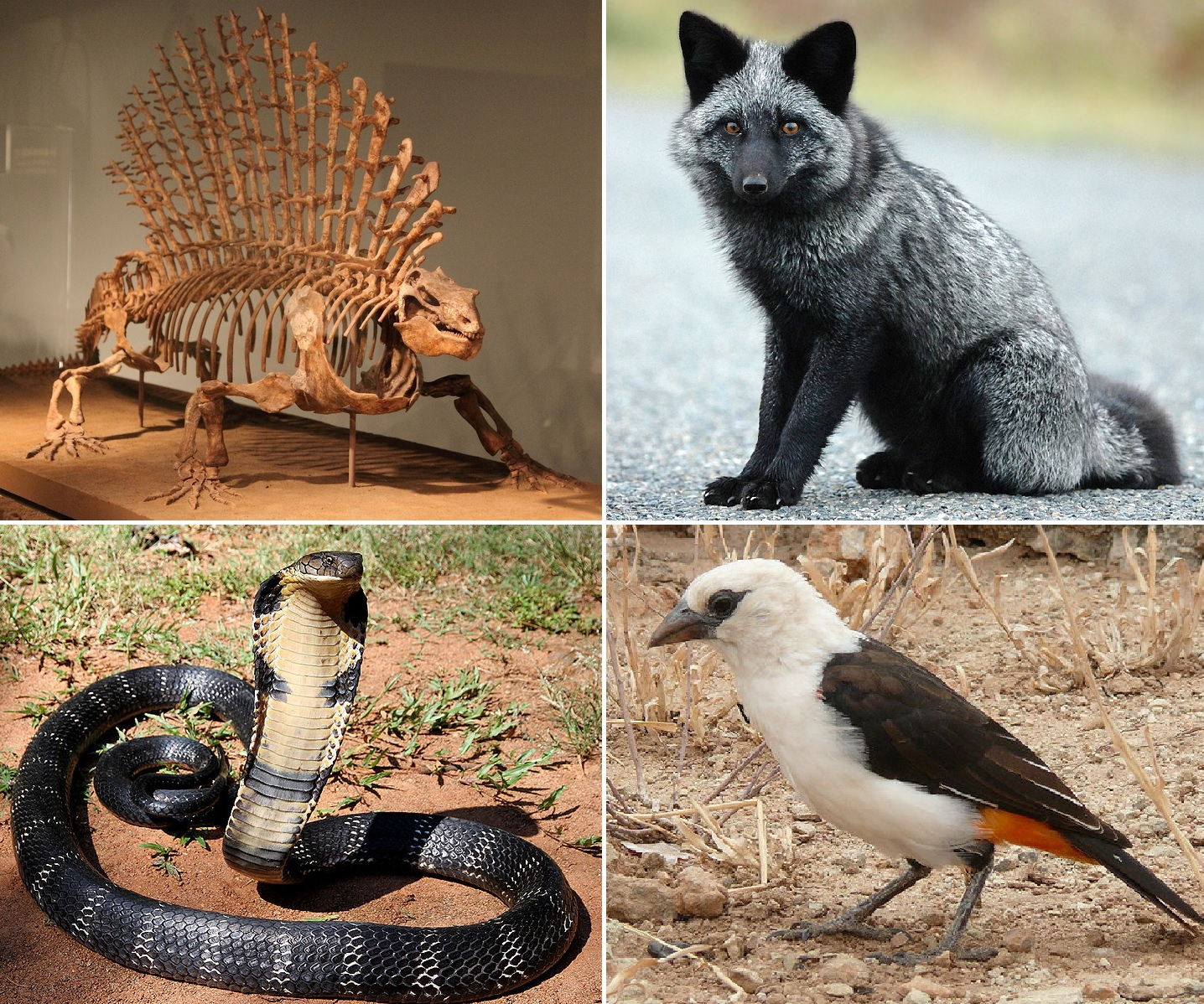
- From top to bottom and left to right, examples of amniotes: Edaphosaurus, silver fox (two synapsids), king cobra and a white-headed buffalo weaver (two sauropsids).

Scientific classification
- Kingdom: Animalia
- Phylum: Chordata
- Clade: Tetrapoda
- Clade: Reptiliomorpha
- Clade: Amniota; Haeckel, 1866

Clades
- Synapsida
- Sauropsida
incertae sedis
- †Casineria?
- †Kraterokheirodon
- †Diadectomorpha?
- †Araeoscelidia?
- †Captorhinidae?
- †Protorothyrididae?
- †Varanopidae

= Amniote =

Amniotes Temporal range: Carboniferous–Present

Clade of tetrapods

Amniotes are tetrapod vertebrate animals belonging to the clade Amniota, a large group that comprises the vast majority of living terrestrial and semiaquatic vertebrates. Amniotes evolved from reptiliomorph ancestors during the Carboniferous period. Amniota is defined as the smallest crown clade (the group including all descendants of the last common ancestor) containing humans, the Greek tortoise, and the Nile crocodile. Amniota is divided into two major clades, Synapsida, containing mammals and their extinct relatives, and Sauropsida, containing reptiles and birds. Amniotes represent a crucial evolutionary step in vertebrate history, marking the transition from aquatic to fully terrestrial life.

Amniotes are distinguished from the other living tetrapod clade — the non-amniote lissamphibians (frogs/toads, salamanders/newts and caecilians) — by the development of three extraembryonic membranes (amnion for embryonic protection, chorion for gas exchange, and allantois for metabolic waste disposal or storage), internal fertilization, thicker and keratinized skin, costal respiration (breathing by expanding and constricting the rib cage), the presence of adrenocortical and chromaffin tissues as a discrete pair of glands near their kidneys, more complex kidneys, the presence of an astragalus for better extremity range of motion, the diminished role of skin breathing, and the complete loss of metamorphosis, gills, and lateral lines.

The presence of an amniotic buffer, of a water-impermeable skin, and of a robust, air-breathing, respiratory system, allow amniotes to live on land as true terrestrial animals. Amniotes have the ability to procreate without water bodies. Because the amnion and the fluid it secretes shield the embryo from environmental fluctuations, amniotes can reproduce on dry land by either laying shelled eggs (birds, monotremes, and most reptiles), retaining shelled eggs in the mother's body until they hatch (ovoviviparity, in some reptiles), or nurturing fertilized eggs within the mother (viviparity in marsupial and placental mammals). This distinguishes amniotes from anamniotes (fish and amphibians) that have to spawn in aquatic environments. Most amniotes still require regular access to drinking water for rehydration, like the semiaquatic amphibians do.

They have better homeostasis in drier environments, and more efficient non-aquatic gas exchange to power terrestrial locomotion, which is facilitated by their astragalus.

== Etymology ==
The term amniote comes from the amnion, which derives from Greek ἀμνίον (amnion), which denoted the membrane that surrounds a fetus. The term originally described a bowl in which the blood of sacrificed animals was caught, and derived from ἀμνός (amnos), meaning "lamb".

== Description ==
Anatomy of an amniotic egg.

Zoologists characterize amniotes in part by embryonic development that includes the formation of several extensive membranes, the amnion, chorion, and allantois. Amniotes develop directly into a (typically) terrestrial form with limbs and a thick stratified epithelium (rather than first entering a feeding larval tadpole stage followed by metamorphosis, as amphibians do). In amniotes, the transition from a two-layered periderm to a cornified epithelium is triggered by thyroid hormone during embryonic development, rather than by metamorphosis. The unique embryonic features of amniotes may reflect specializations for eggs to survive drier environments; or the increase in size and yolk content of eggs may have permitted, and coevolved with, direct development of the embryo to a large size.

=== Adaptation for terrestrial living ===
Features of amniotes evolved for survival on land include a sturdy but porous leathery or hard eggshell and an allantois that facilitates respiration while providing a reservoir for disposal of wastes. Their kidneys (metanephros) and large intestines are also well-suited to water retention. Most mammals do not lay eggs, but corresponding structures develop inside the placenta. The evolution of reproductive strategies such as oviparity, ovoviviparity, and viviparity occurred independently across multiple amniote lineages, likely influenced by environmental pressures such as temperature, humidity, and predation risk.

The modest-sized ancestors of the amniotes laid their eggs in moist places, such as depressions under fallen logs or other suitable places in the Carboniferous swamps and forests; and dry conditions probably do not account for the emergence of the soft shell. Indeed, many modern-day amniotes require moisture to keep their eggs from desiccating. Although some modern amphibians lay eggs on land, all amphibians lack advanced traits like an amnion.

The amniotic egg formed through a series of evolutionary steps. After internal fertilization and the habit of laying eggs in terrestrial environments became a reproduction strategy amongst the amniote ancestors, the next major breakthrough appears to have involved a gradual replacement of the gelatinous coating covering the amphibian egg with a fibrous shell membrane. This allowed the egg to increase both its size and in the rate of gas exchange, permitting a larger, metabolically more active embryo to reach full development before hatching. Further developments, like extraembryonic membranes (amnion, chorion, and allantois), were not essential and probably evolved later. It has been suggested that shelled terrestrial eggs without extraembryonic membranes could still not have been more than about 1 cm (0.4-inch) in diameter because of diffusion problems, like the inability to get rid of carbon dioxide if the egg was larger. The combination of small eggs and the absence of a larval stage, where posthatching growth occurs in anamniotic tetrapods before turning into juveniles, would limit the size of the adults. This is supported by the fact that extant squamate species that lay eggs less than 1 cm in diameter have adults whose snout-vent length is less than 10 cm. The only way for the eggs to increase in size would be to develop new internal structures specialized for respiration and for waste products. As this happened, it would also affect how much the juveniles could grow before they reached adulthood. A similar pattern can be seen in modern amphibians. Frogs that have evolved terrestrial reproduction and direct development have both smaller adults and fewer and larger eggs compared to their relatives that still reproduce in water.

An alternative hypothesis is that amniotes evolved as a result of extended embryo retention (EER), where the extraembryonic membranes originated in the oviducts of the fertilized female to control the interaction between the embryos and the female. The eggs in groups like turtles, crocodilians and birds, which are laid at a much earlier developmental stage, would be a secondary evolved trait. Another hypothesis is that the amniote egg developed in aquatic environment either due to pressure to adjust the hatching period to optimal conditions, or the laying environment was otherwise hostile to earlier tetrapod eggs, such as chemical conditions in the water or high levels of predation.

It has been suggested that the outer layer of amniote eggs was probably ancestrally soft and leathery similar to those of monotreme mammals, which would explain the lack of fossilised remains of amniote eggshells prior to the Mesozoic, when hard mineralised eggshells made of calcite developed among some sauropsid lineages.

=== Skeletal traits ===
While the early amniotes resembled their amphibian ancestors in many respects, a key difference was the lack of an otic notch at the back margin of the skull roof. In their ancestors, this notch held a spiracle, an unnecessary structure in an animal without an aquatic larval stage. While it was suggested historically that the ancestral amniote skull was anapsid (having no openings called temporal fenestrae at the back of the skull), it has recently been suggested that the development of a single synapsid-like lower temporal fenestra was present in the common ancestor of amniotes, and indeed is a distinguishing trait (synapomorphy) of amniotes relative to earlier reptiliomorphs.

A 1988 study suggested that post-cranial remains of amniotes can be identified based on having at least two pairs of sacral ribs, a sternum in the pectoral girdle (some amniotes have lost it) and an astragalus bone in the ankle (though the astragalus bone was later found to also be present in advanced reptiliomorphs^{supplemental material}). A different set of unambiguous apomorphies (distinguishing characters ancestrally present in amniotes as opposed to earlier reptiliomorphs) was proposed in a 2025 study, including the lacrimal bone having a "moderate contribution" to the outer rim of the orbit (eye socket), the posterior (backwardly along the length of the skull) projecting process (extension) of the postorbital bone is narrow, the posterior margin of the jugal bone is free and does not contact the squamosal bone, the lingual wall on the inner side of the mouth surrounding the teeth is low, and in the dorsal vertebrae, the neural arches are fused to the centra.^{supplemental material}

== Evolutionary history ==
Basal amniotes resembled small lizards and evolved from earlier reptiliomorphs. After their origins, they almost immediately diverged into two groups, namely the sauropsids (including all reptiles and birds) and synapsids (including mammals and extinct ancestors like "pelycosaurs" and therapsids). This basal divergence within Amniota has also been dated by molecular studies at 310–329 Ma, or 312–330 Ma, and by a fossilized birth–death process study at 322–340 Ma. Fossil footprints with claws from Snowy Plains Formation of Australia, dating to the Tournaisian c. 350 million years ago, were claimed in 2025 as evidence of amniotes having existed by this time, since it was widely assumed that claws were a distinctive characteristic of amniotes or amiotes and their closest relatives, but the presence of claw-like phalanges in Westlothiana, now considered a stem-tetrapod, challenges this assumption, and indicates that the trackmaker could have been a stem-tetrapod rather than an amniote, and thus not providing any clear evidence for the origin time of Amniota. Among the earliest confidently identified amniotes are the synapsids Melanedaphodon and Archaeothyris, dating to the Moscovian, around 306-307 million years ago, with the earliest sauropsids appearing shortly after (Hylonomus dating to 318 Ma, is now considered a reptiliomorph rather than a sauropsid). After the Carboniferous rainforest collapse, amniotes spread around Earth's land and became the dominant land vertebrates.

== Definition and classification ==
Amniota was first formally described by the embryologist Ernst Haeckel in 1866 on the presence of the amnion, hence the name. A problem with this definition is that the trait (apomorphy) in question does not fossilize, and the status of fossil forms has to be inferred from other traits.

Amniotes

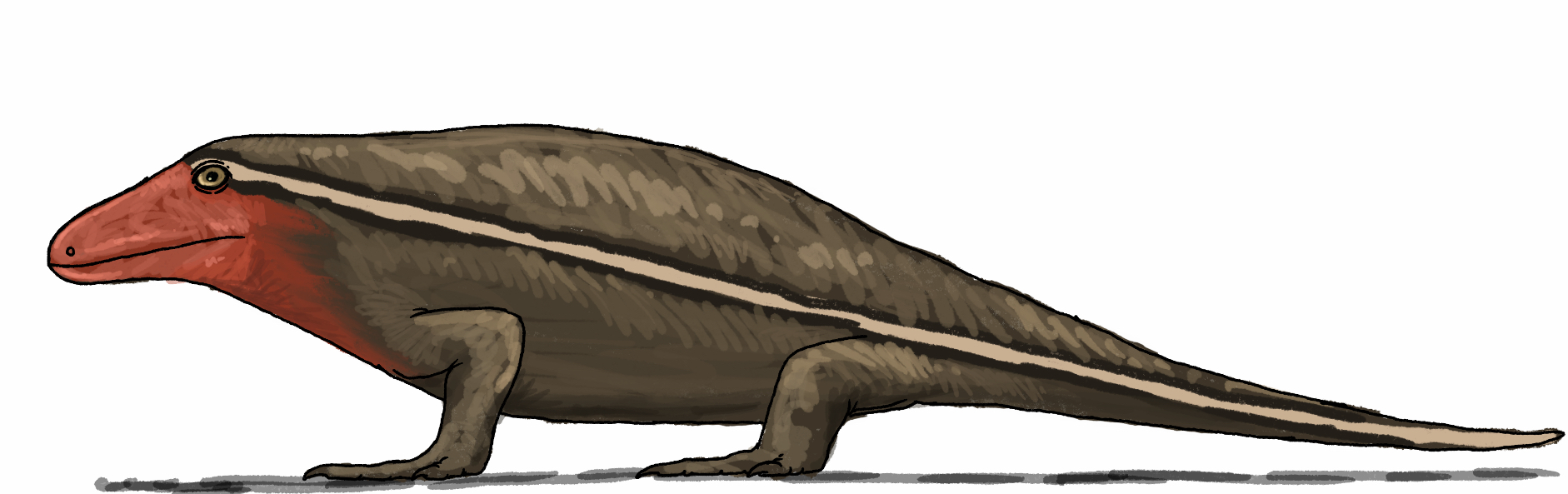
Archaeothyris, one of the most basal synapsids, first appears in the fossil records about 306 million years ago.

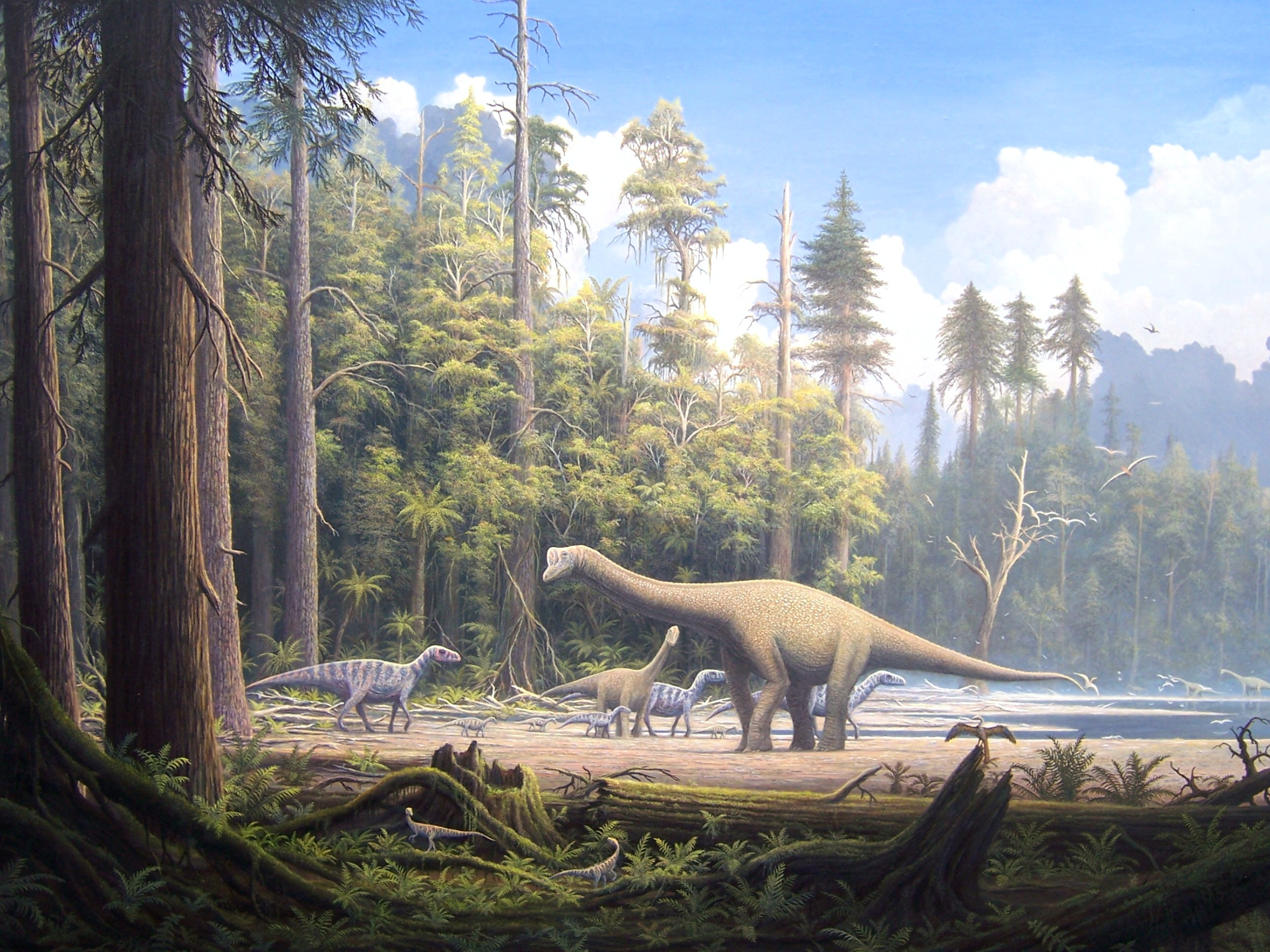
By the Mesozoic, 150 million years ago, sauropsids included the largest animals anywhere. Shown are some late Jurassic dinosaurs, including the early bird Archaeopteryx perched on a tree stump.

=== Traditional classification ===
Older classifications of the amniotes traditionally recognised three classes based on major traits and physiology:

- Class Reptilia (reptiles)
  - Subclass Anapsida ("proto-reptiles", possibly including turtles)
  - Subclass Diapsida (majority of reptiles, progenitors of birds)
  - Subclass Euryapsida (plesiosaurs, placodonts, and ichthyosaurs)
  - Subclass Synapsida (stem or proto-mammals, progenitors of mammals)
- Class Aves (birds)
  - Subclass Archaeornithes (reptile-like birds, progenitors of all other birds)
  - Subclass Enantiornithes (early birds with an alternative shoulder joint)
  - Subclass Hesperornithes (toothed aquatic flightless birds)
  - Subclass Ichthyornithes (toothed, but otherwise modern birds)
  - Subclass Neornithes (all living birds)
- Class Mammalia (mammals)
  - Subclass Prototheria (Monotremata, egg-laying mammals)
  - Subclass Theria (metatheria (such as marsupials) and eutheria (such as placental mammals))

This rather orderly scheme is the one most commonly found in popular and basic scientific works. It has come under critique from cladistics, as the class Reptilia is paraphyletic—it has given rise to two other classes not included in Reptilia.

Most species described as microsaurs, formerly grouped in the extinct and prehistoric amphibian group lepospondyls, have been placed in the newer clade Recumbirostra, and share many anatomical features with amniotes, indicating they were close relatives of crown-group amniotes

=== Modern classification ===
With the advent of cladistics, other researchers have attempted to establish new classes, based on phylogeny, but disregarding the physiological and anatomical unity of the groups. Unlike Benton, for example, Jacques Gauthier and colleagues forwarded a definition of Amniota in 1988 as "the most recent common ancestor of extant mammals and reptiles, and all its descendants". As Gauthier makes use of a crown group definition, Amniota has a slightly different content than the biological amniotes as defined by an apomorphy. Though traditionally considered reptiliomorphs, some recent research has recovered diadectomorphs as the sister group to Synapsida within Amniota, based on inner ear anatomy, although this has been disputed.

- Clade Synapsida
  - Various extinct groups ("Pelycosauria")
  - Therapsida
    - Various extinct groups
    - Cynodontia
      - Mammalia
        - Monotremata
        - Theria
- Clade Sauropsida
  - Various extinct groups
  - Sauria
    - Lepidosauria (lizards, snakes and tuatara)
    - Archelosauria
      - Testudines (turtles)
      - Archosauria
        - Crocodylia
        - Dinosauria
          - Various extinct groups
          - Aves (birds)

=== Phylogeny ===
Cladogram showing the placement of Amniota within Tetrapoda:supplementary figure S3

- crown-group Tetrapoda
  - Temnospondyli (including Lissamphibia, i.e. modern amphibians)
  - Reptiliomorpha
    - Extinct stem-amniotes (basal reptiliomorphs)
    - Amniota
      - Synapsida (mammals and their extinct relatives)
      - Sauropsida (reptiles, dinosaurs, birds, etc.)
