= Allantois =

Embryonic structure

- Diagram illustrating a chicken egg in its 9th day with all extraembryonic membranes

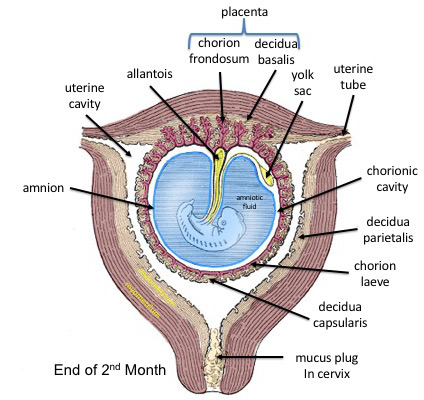
- Allantois and other fetal membranes shown at end of second month of human pregnancy

Details
- Pronunciation: /əˈlæntɔɪs/, /əˈlæntoʊɪs/
- Days: 16

Identifiers
- Latin: allantois
- MeSH: D000482
- TE: E6.0.1.2.0.0.2

The allantois (/əˈlæntoʊɪs/ a-LAN-toe-iss; pl.: allantoides or allantoises) is one of the four membranes of the extraembryonic tissue arising from the yolk sac. It is a hollow sac-like structure filled with clear fluid that forms part of the developing conceptus in an amniote that helps the embryo exchange gases and handle liquid waste. The other extraembryonic membranes are the yolk sac, the amnion, and the chorion. In mammals these membranes are known as fetal membranes.

The allantois, along with the amnion, chorion, and yolk sac (other extraembryonic membranes), identify humans and other mammals, birds, and reptiles as amniotes. These extraembryonic membranes that form the embryo have aided amniotes in the transition from aquatic to terrestrial environments. Fish and amphibians are anamniotes, lacking the allantois.

== Function ==
This sac-like structure, whose name is Greek for sausage (from ἀλλαντοειδής allantoeidḗs, in reference to its shape when first formed) is primarily involved in nutrition and excretion, and is webbed with blood vessels. The function of the allantois is to collect liquid waste from the embryo, as well as to exchange gases used by the embryo.

=== In mammals ===
In mammals, except the egg-laying monotremes, the allantois is one of the fetal membranes, and is part of and forms an axis for the development of the umbilical cord.

While the function of the allantois remains conserved, there is a divergence in the characteristics of the allantois among mammalian species. Structural variations of the allantois include differences in size and shape.

In mammals, the emergence of the allantois varies during early development. In humans, the allantois appears during the presomitic stages of mid-gastrulation. The mouse allantois appears before the first somite pair as well; however, it occurs shortly after gastrulation. In both pigs and rabbits, the allantois arises at early somite stages.

The human allantois is a caudal out-pouching of the yolk sac, which becomes surrounded by the mesodermal connecting stalk known as the body-stalk. The vasculature of the body-stalk develops into umbilical arteries that carry deoxygenated blood to the placenta. It is externally continuous with the proctodeum and internally continuous with the cloaca. The embryonic allantois becomes the fetal urachus, which connects the fetal bladder (developed from cloaca) to the yolk sac. The urachus removes nitrogenous waste from the fetal bladder. After birth the urachus becomes obliterated as the median umbilical ligament.

The mouse allantois consists of mesodermal tissue, which undergoes vasculogenesis to form the mature umbilical artery and vein.

=== In marsupials ===
In most marsupials, the allantois is avascular, having no blood vessels, but still serves the purpose of storing nitrogenous (NH_{3}) waste. Also, most marsupial allantoises do not fuse with the chorion. An exception is the allantois of the bandicoot, which has a vasculature, and fuses with the chorion. Koalas and wombats also demonstrate allantoic fusion with the chorion.

=== In reptiles and birds ===
A diagram of a monotreme egg showing allantois at #4

The structure first evolved in reptiles and birds as a reservoir for nitrogenous waste, and also as a means for oxygenation of the embryo. Oxygen is absorbed by the allantois through the egg shell.

In most reptiles and birds, the allantois consists of extraembryonic endoderm enclosed in mesodermal tissue. A chorioallantoic membrane (CAM) is later formed from the chorion and allantois.

== Clinical significance ==
During the third week of embryonic development, the allantois protrudes into the area of the urogenital sinus. During fetal development, the allantois becomes the urachus, a duct between the bladder and the yolk sac. A patent allantois can result in a urachal cyst.

Because the allantois can be cultured ex vivo, it has utility as a model system for studying the formation of blood vessels as well as considerable usefulness in drug screening.

== Additional images ==
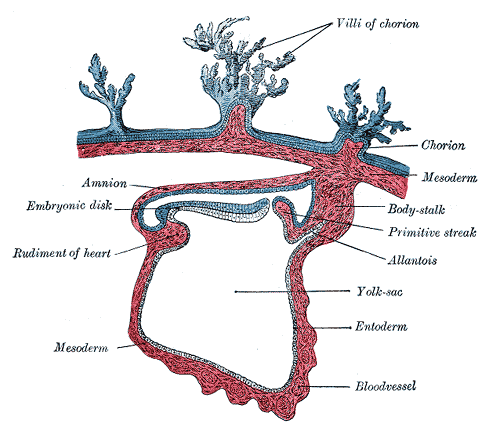
Section through the embryo

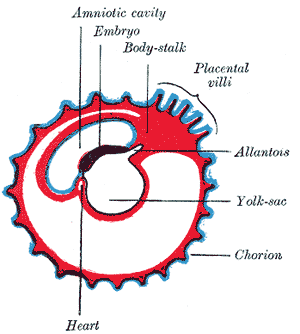
Diagram showing later stage of allantoic development with commencing constriction of the yolk-sac

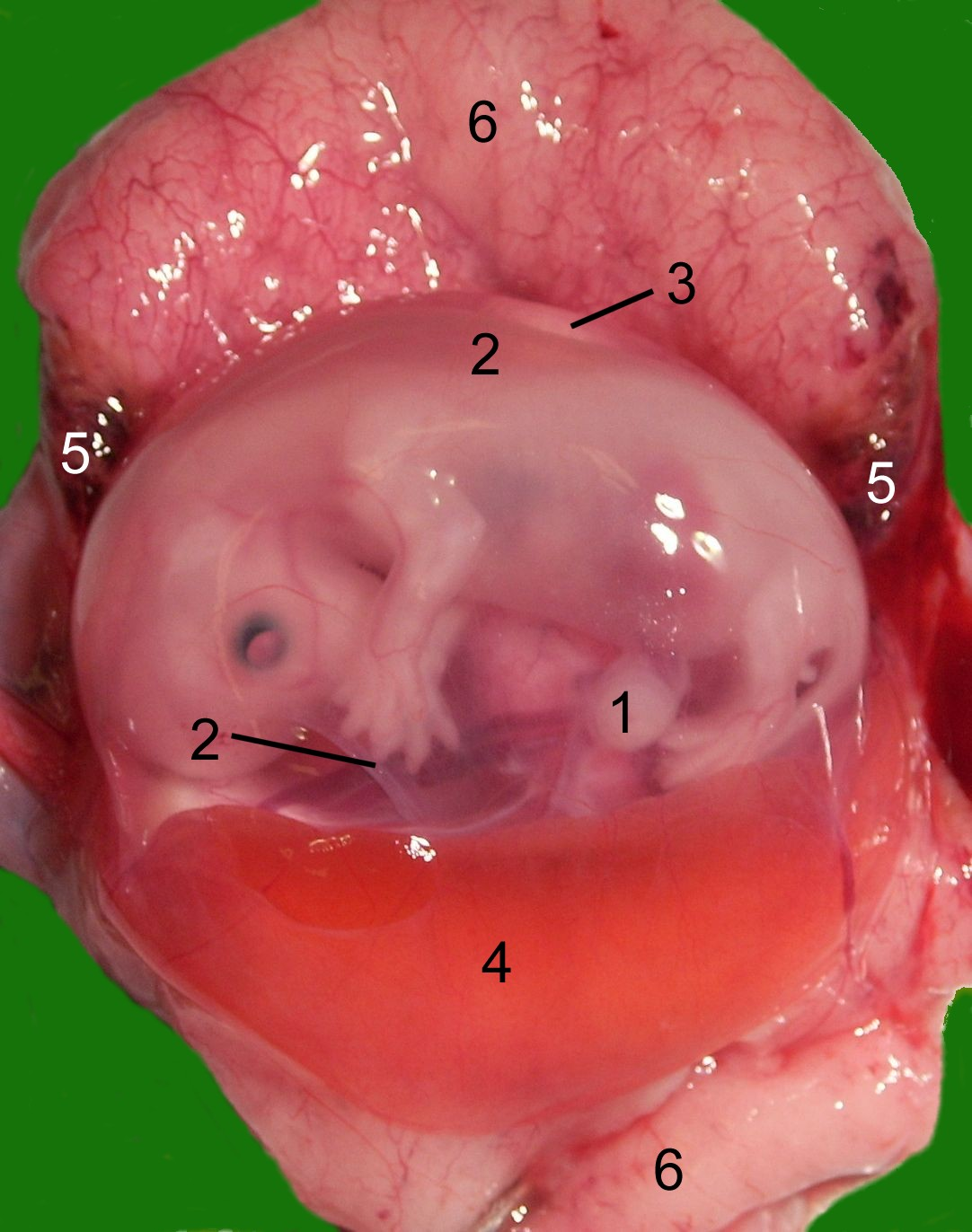
Opened uterus with cat fetus in midgestation: 1 umbilicus, 2 amniotic sac (chorion and amnion), 3 allantois
