= Connecting stalk =

Embryonic structure

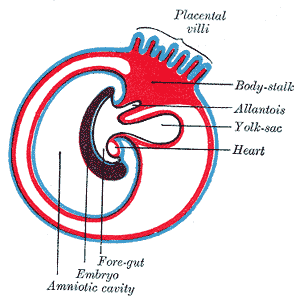
- Diagram showing the expansion of amnion and delimitation of the umbilical cord

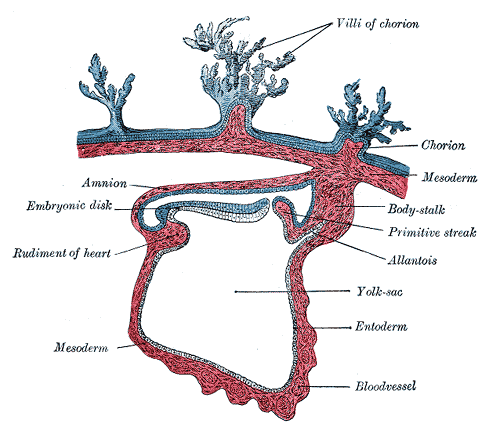
- Section through the embryo

Details
- Precursor: Extraembryonic mesoderm

Identifiers
- Latin: pedunculus connectans
- TE: stalk_by_E5.11.3.1.1.0.4 E5.11.3.1.1.0.4

The connecting stalk, or body stalk, is an embryonic structure that is formed by the third week of development and connects the embryo to its shell of trophoblasts. The connecting stalk is derived from the extraembryonic mesoderm. Initially it lies caudally to the trilaminar germ disc, but, with subsequent embryonic folding, the body stalk assume a more ventral position. Progressive expansion of the amnion from the umbilical ring (surrounding the roots of the vitelline duct and connecting stalk) creates a tube with a covering of amniotic membrane with allantois and umbilical vessels as its content and mesoderm of the connecting stalk as the ground substance. This extraembryonic mesodermal ground substance forms the future Wharton's jelly. The amniotic membrane and its contents form the umbilical cord that connects the embryo and the placenta.

The root of the connecting stalk contains the allantois as a diverticulum of hindgut endoderm along with umbilical vessels.

Anomalies are usually referred to as body stalk anomalies and occur in approximately 1 in 15,000 births. They are due to defects in the formation of the cephalic, caudal, and lateral embryonic body folds, that result in a reduced or absent umbilical cord.

== Additional images ==
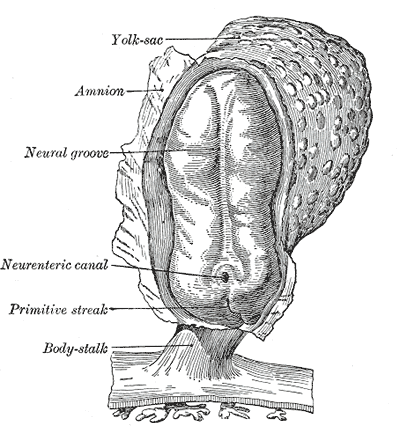
Human embryo—length, 2 mm. Dorsal view, with the amnion laid open. X 30.

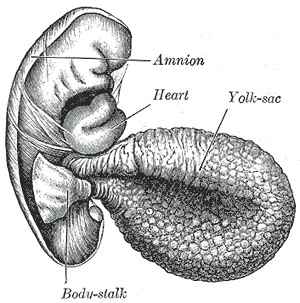
Human embryo of 2.6 mm.

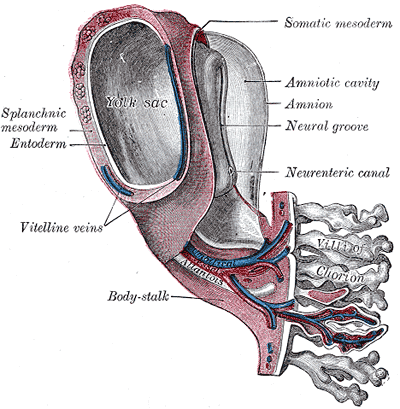
Model of human embryo 1.3 mm. long.

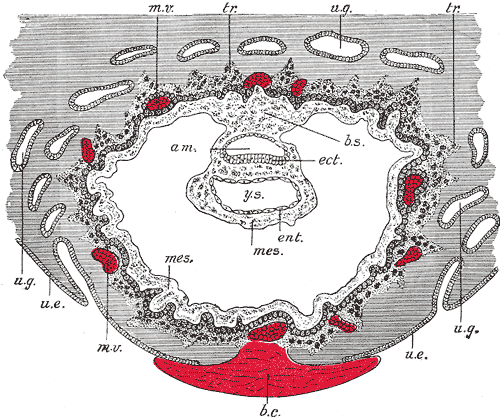
Section through ovum imbedded in the uterine decidua.

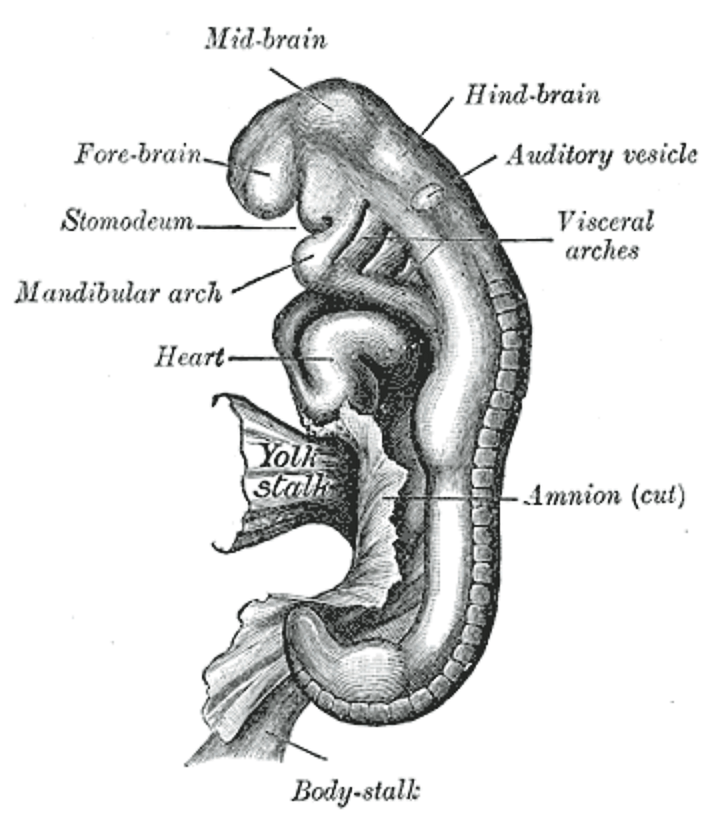
Embryo between eighteen and twenty-one days.
