= Chorion =

Outermost fetal membrane around the embryo in amniotes

- Diagram showing the chorion of a chicken egg

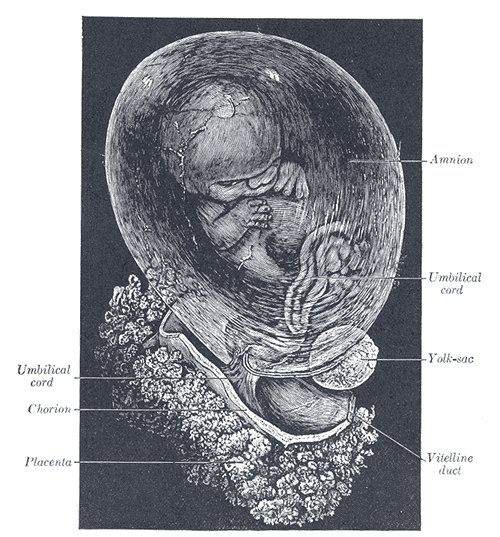
- Human fetus enclosed in the amnion

Details

Identifiers
- Latin: chorion
- TE: E5.11.3.1.1.0.3

The chorion is the outermost fetal membrane around the embryo in mammals, birds and reptiles (amniotes). It is also present around the embryo of other animals, like insects and molluscs.

== Structure ==
In humans and other therian mammals, the chorion is one of the fetal membranes that exist during pregnancy between the developing fetus and mother. The chorion and the amnion together form the amniotic sac. In humans it is formed by extraembryonic mesoderm and the two layers of trophoblast that surround the embryo and other membranes; the chorionic villi emerge from the chorion, invade the endometrium, and allow the transfer of nutrients from maternal blood to fetal blood.

=== Growth ===
The chorion undergoes rapid proliferation and forms numerous processes, the chorionic villi, which invade and destroy the uterine decidua, while simultaneously absorbing nutritive materials from it for the growth of the embryo.

The chorionic villi are at first small and non-vascular, and consist of the trophoblast only, but they increase in size and ramify, whereas the mesoderm, carrying branches of the umbilical vessels, grows into them, and they are vascularized.

Blood is carried to the villi by the paired umbilical arteries, which branch into chorionic arteries and enter the chorionic villi as cotyledon arteries. After circulating through the capillaries of the villi, the blood is returned to the embryo by the umbilical vein. Until about the end of the second month of pregnancy, the villi cover the entire chorion, and are almost uniform in size; but, after this, they develop unequally.

=== Layers ===
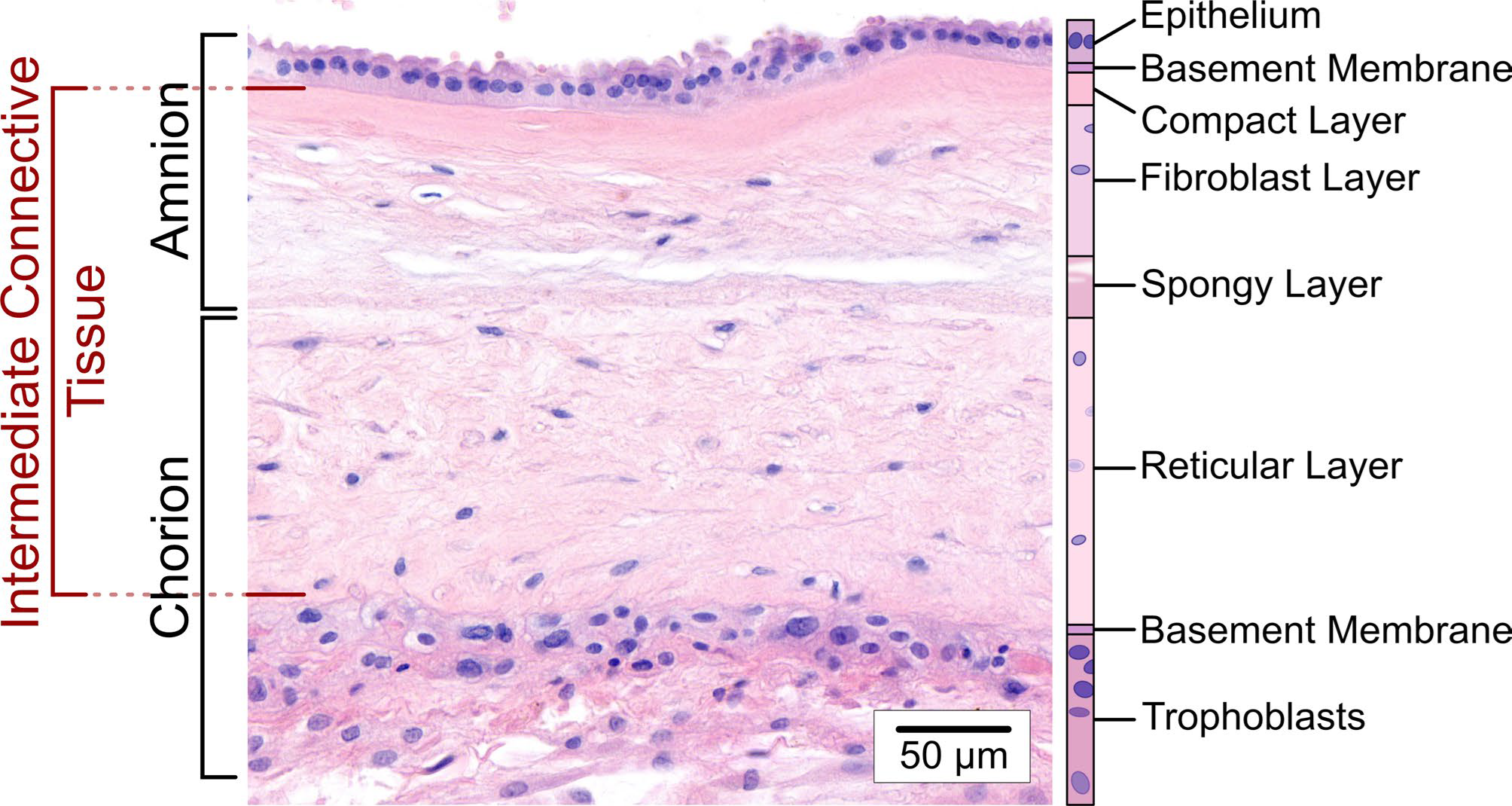
H&E-stained fetal membranes following primary cesarean delivery, showing the amnion and chorion.

Two of the fetal membranes are the amnion and the chorion. The amnion comprises a single layer of epithelium, a basement membrane, a compact layer, a fibroblast layer, and a spongy layer. The chorion comprises a reticular layer, basement membrane, and trophoblast layer. The collagen-rich extracellular matrix between the amniotic and chorionic basement membranes is collectively termed the intermediate connective tissue.

Embryologically, the chorion consists of an outer trophoblastic layer and an inner layer derived from the extraembryonic mesoderm. The trophoblast comprises an inner layer of cuboidal or prismatic cells, called the cytotrophoblast or layer of Langhans, and an outer multinucleated layer called the syncytiotrophoblast.

=== Parts ===
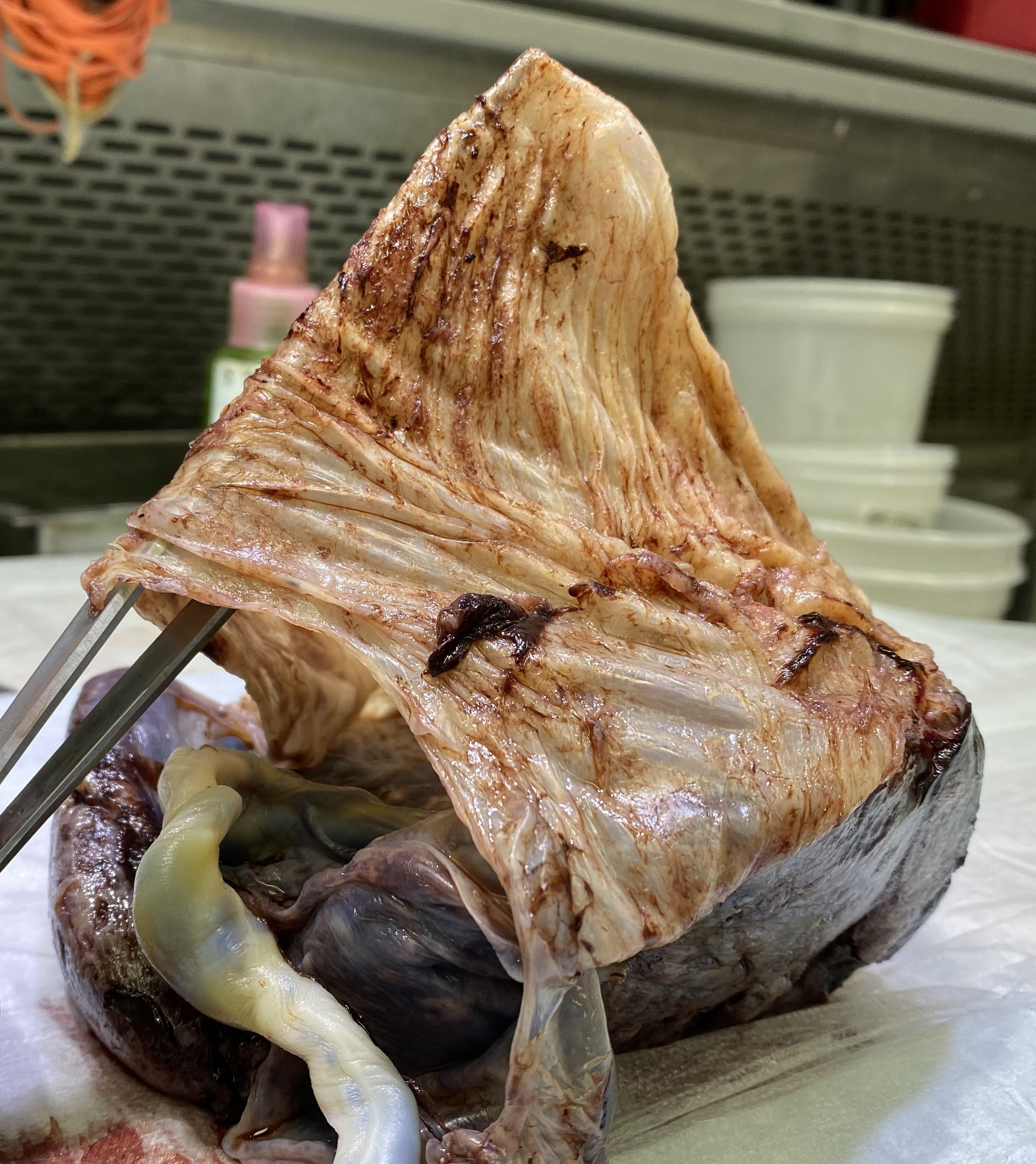
Placenta with attached fetal membranes (ruptured at the margin at the left in the image), which consists of the chorion (outer layer) and amnion (inner layer).

The part of the chorion that is in contact with the decidua capsularis undergoes atrophy, so that by the fourth month scarcely a trace of the villi is left. This part of the chorion becomes smooth, and is named the chorion laeve (from the Latin word levis, meaning smooth). As it takes no share in the formation of the placenta, this is also named the non-placental part of the chorion. As the chorion grows, the chorion laeve comes in contact with the decidua parietalis and these layers fuse.

The villi at the embryonic pole, which is in contact with the decidua basalis, increase greatly in size and complexity, and hence this part is named the chorion frondosum.

Thus the placenta develops from the chorion frondosum and the decidua basalis.

=== Monochorionic twins ===
Monochorionic twins are twins that share the same placenta. This occurs in 0.3% of all multiple-birth human pregnancies, and in 75% of monozygotic (identical) twins, when the split takes place on or after the third day after fertilization. The remaining 25% of monozygous twins become dichorionic diamniotic. The condition may affect any type of multiple birth, resulting in monochorionic multiples.

=== Infections ===
Recent studies indicate that the chorion may be susceptible to pathogenic infections. Recent findings indicate that Ureaplasma parvum bacteria can infect the chorion tissue, thereby impacting pregnancy outcome. In addition, footprints of JC polyomavirus and Merkel cell polyomavirus have been detected in chorionic villi from females affected by spontaneous abortion as well as pregnant women. Another virus, BK polyomavirus has been detected in the same tissues, but with lesser extent.

== Other animals ==
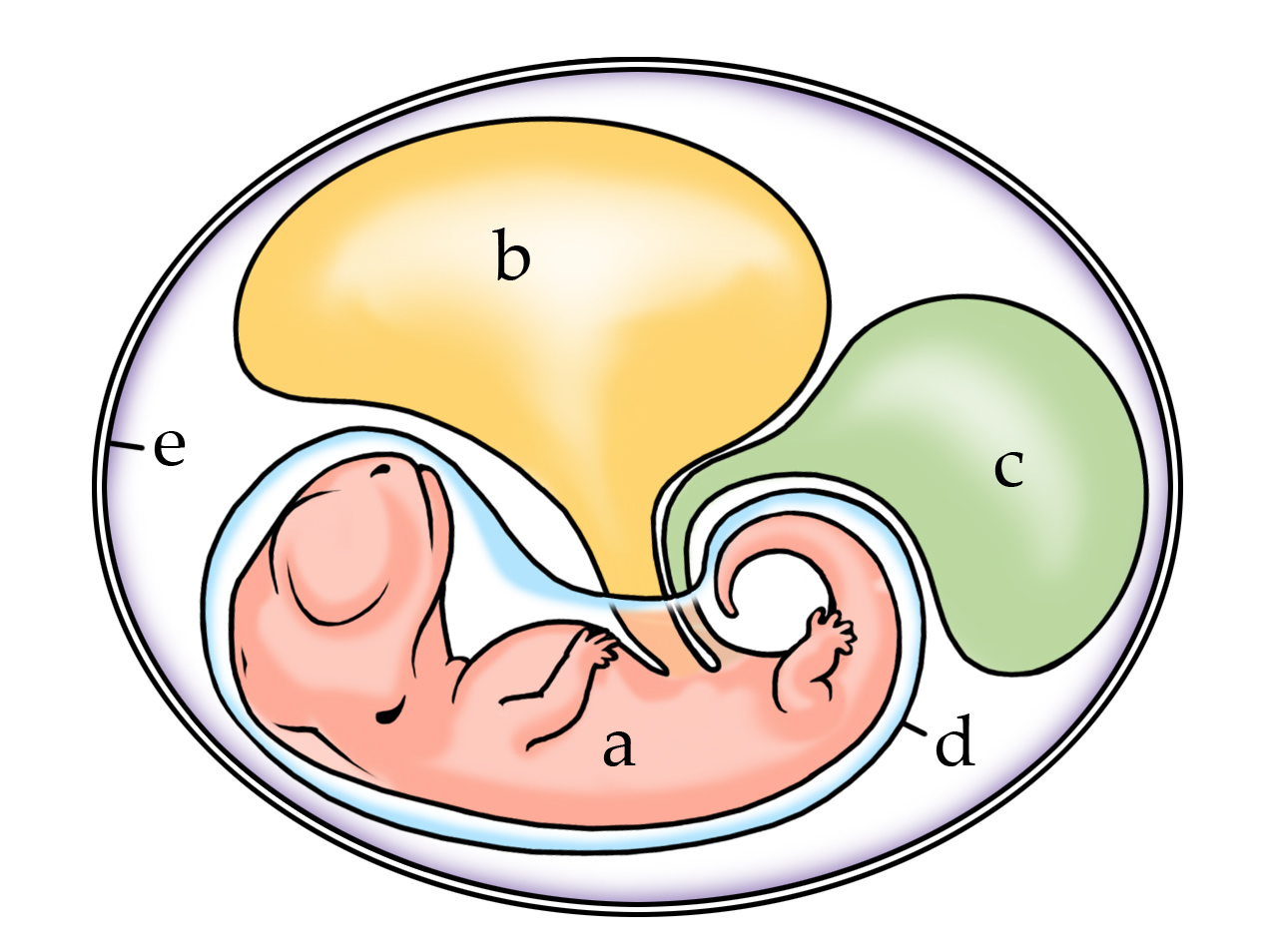
Amniotic embryo. a=embryo, b=yolk, c=allantois, d=amnion, e=chorion

In reptiles, birds, and monotremes, the chorion is one of the four extraembryonic membranes that make up the amniotic egg that provide for the nutrients and protection needed for the embryo's survival. It is located inside the albumen, which is the white of the egg. It encloses the embryo and the rest of the embryonic system. The chorion is also present in insects. During growth and development of the embryo, there is an increased need for oxygen. To compensate for this, the chorion and the allantois fuse together to form the chorioallantoic membrane. Together these form a double membrane, which functions to remove carbon dioxide and to replenish oxygen through the porous shell. At the time of hatching, the fetus becomes detached from the chorion as it emerges from the shell.

In insects, it develops by the follicle cells while the egg is in the ovary. Some mollusks also have chorions as part of their eggs. For example, fragile octopus eggs have only a chorion as their envelope.

=== Additional images ===
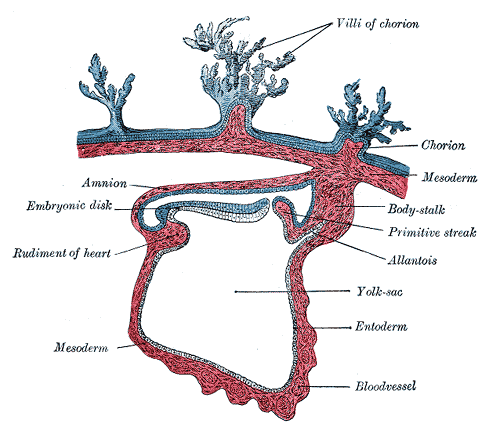
Section through the embryo.

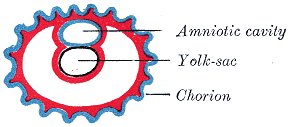
Diagram of the human embryo.

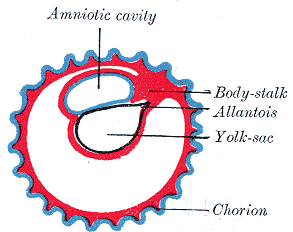
Diagram illustrating early formation of allantois and differentiation of body-stalk.

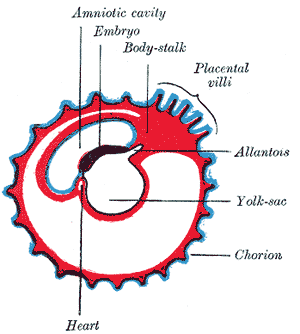
Diagram showing later stage of allantoic development with commencing constriction of the yolk-sac.

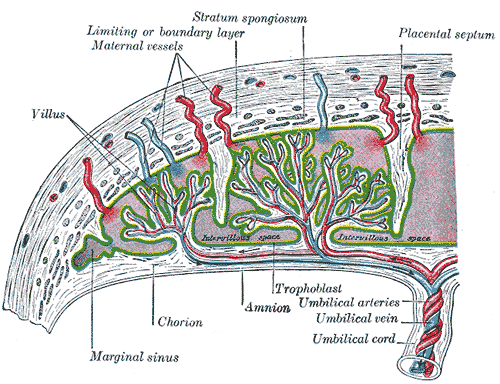
Scheme of placental circulation.

== See also ==
- Choriogenesis
- Chorioamnionitis, an inflammation of the chorion and amnion, usually due to bacterial infection
- Chorionic hematoma
- Gestational trophoblastic disease, any abnormal proliferation of the trophoblasts, including choriocarcinoma, a highly invasive cancer.
