= Extraembryonic tissue =

Non-embryonic supportive membranes of animal embryos

Extraembryonic tissue includes the four extraembryonic membranes which assist in the development of the animal embryo. The membranes occur in a range of animals from mammals to insects. The tissue originates from the zygote, but is not considered part of the embryo. The membranes typically perform roles in nutrition, gas exchange and waste removal. In humans and other mammals they are more usually known as the fetal membranes.

== In amniotes ==
There are four standard extraembryonic membranes in amniotes, i.e. reptiles (including birds) and mammals:

1. the yolk sac which surrounds the yolk
2. the amnion which surrounds and cushions the embryo
3. the allantois which among avians stores embryonic waste and assists with the exchange of carbon dioxide with oxygen as well as the resorption of calcium from the shell, and
4. the chorion which surrounds all of these and in avians successively merges with the allantois in the later stages of egg development to form a combined respiratory and excretory organ called the chorioallantois.

In humans and other mammals they are more usually called fetal membranes.

== In insects ==
The extraembryonic membranes in insects include a serous membrane (serosa) originating from blastoderm cells, an amnion or amniotic cavity whose expression is controlled by the Zerknüllt gene, and a yolk sac.
