= Cutis (anatomy) =

Epidermis and the dermis collectively

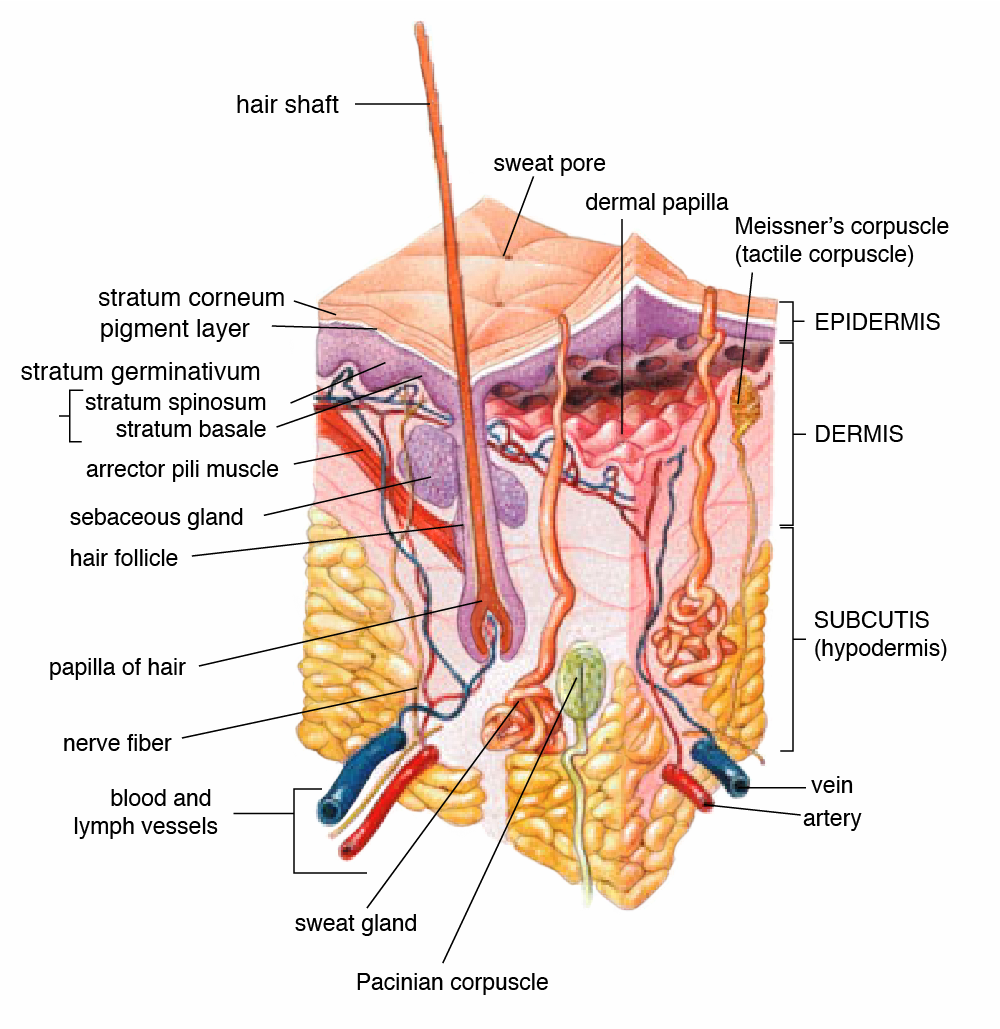
- Cross-section of all skin layers (epidermis and dermis labeled at upper right)

Cutis, often termed the "true skin", is composed of the epidermis and the dermis. The dermis contains blood vessels, sweat glands, sebaceous glands, and hair follicles. The epidermis and the dermis contain sensory nerve endings to detect changes in the environment. The cutis is the layer located above the subcutis.

== Pathology ==
Aplasia cutis congenita results in thin, transparent skin usually on the head. The disease is defined as a congenital absence of skin.
