= ParaHox =

Gene cluster

The ParaHox gene cluster is an array of homeobox genes (involved in morphogenesis, the regulation of patterns of anatomical development) from the Gsx, Xlox (Pdx) and Cdx gene families.

== Regulatory gene cluster ==
These genes were first shown to be arranged into a physically-linked chromosomal cluster in amphioxus, an invertebrate with a single member of each of the three gene families. All the ParaHox genes in the amphioxus genome are therefore in the ParaHox gene cluster. In contrast, the human genome has six ParaHox genes (GSX1, GSX2, PDX1, CDX1, CDX2, CDX4), of which three genes (GSX1, PDX1 (=IPF1), CDX2) are physically linked to form a human ParaHox gene cluster on chromosome 13. Mice have a homologous ParaHox gene cluster on chromosome 5. The other three human ParaHox genes are remnants from duplicated ParaHox gene clusters that were generated in the 2R genome duplications at the base of vertebrate evolution. Some vertebrates, notably chondrichthyan fish and coelacanths, have retained an additional ParaHox gene (PDX2).

The ParaHox gene cluster has been proposed to be a paralogue, or evolutionary sister, of the Hox gene cluster; the two gene clusters being descendent from a segmental duplication early in animal evolution, preceding the divergence of cnidarians and bilaterian animals. It has been suggested that an ancient role of the ParaHox gene cluster in bilaterians was to specify or pattern the through-gut, with Gsx patterning the mouth, Xlox (=Pdx) patterning the midgut and Cdx marking the anus. Gene expression and functional data lends tentative support to this hypothesis, although in many animals the roles of the genes have changed in evolution, notably the Gsx gene family which plays a role in brain (not foregut) development in vertebrates.

== See also ==
- ParaHoxozoa
