= Umbilical folds =

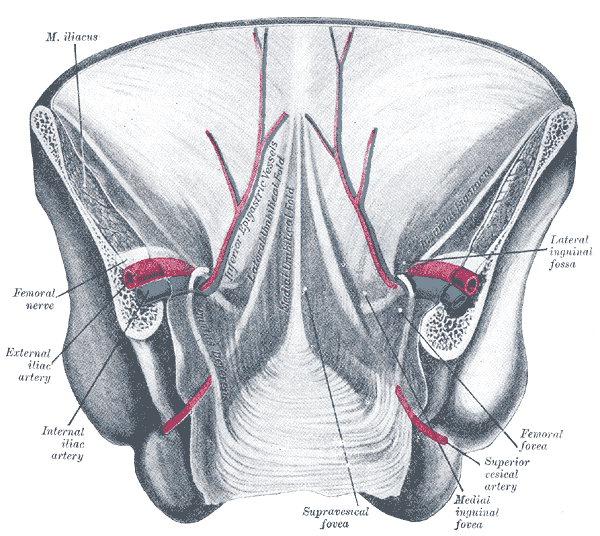
- Posterior view of the anterior abdominal wall in its lower half. Umbilical folds labeled near middle.

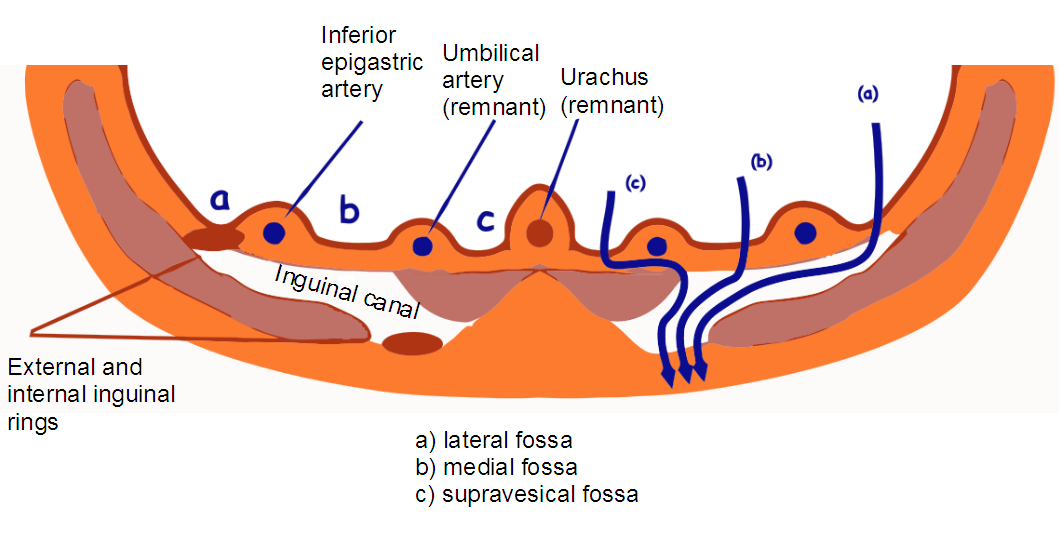
- Inguinal fossae

Details

Identifiers
- Latin: plica umbilicalis medialis, plica umbilicalis mediana, plica umbilicalis lateralis

Related to the urinary bladder, anteriorly there are the following folds:

- one median umbilical fold on the median umbilical ligament (which in turn, contains the urachus)
- two medial umbilical folds on the occluded umbilical artery
- two lateral umbilical folds on the inferior epigastric vessels
