= Squeeze =

Squeeze or squeezing may refer to:

== Film and television ==
- Squeeze (1980 film), a New Zealand drama
- Squeeze (1997 film), an American crime film
- "Squeeze" (The X-Files), a TV episode
- "Squeeze" (The Walking Dead), a TV episode

== Music ==
- Squeeze (band), an English rock band
  - Squeeze (Squeeze album), 1978
- Squeeze (The Velvet Underground album), 1973
- Squeeze (Fiona album), 1992
- Squeeze (Sasami album), 2022
- "Squeeze", a song by Fifth Harmony from 7/27, 2016
- Squeeze, an earlier name for the 1970s band T.U.S.H.

== Science and technology ==
- Squeeze, a version of Debian GNU/Linux
- SQ (program), a 1980s file compression utility
- Sorenson Squeeze, a video transcoder (2001–2019)
- Barotrauma, injuries caused by a pressure difference

== Sports and games ==
- Squeeze (chess) or zugzwang, a chess tactic
- Squeeze play (baseball), a type of sacrifice in baseball
- Squeeze play (bridge), a tactic in contract bridge
- Squeeze play (poker), a bluff re-raise

== Other uses ==
- Squeeze paper, or squeeze, a reverse copy of an inscription
- Hug, a form of human endearment
- Squeeze, a Prohibition era alcoholic drink made from Sterno

== See also ==
- The Squeeze (disambiguation)
- Squeezed (disambiguation)
- Compression (physics), applying balanced inward forces
- Squeeze bottle, to hold viscous fluids
- Squeezebox (disambiguation)
- Squeeze job, in oil and gas exploration
- Squeeze play (disambiguation)
- Squeeze theorem, in calculus
- Short squeeze and long squeeze, in the stock market
- SQUOZE, a 1958 punch-card data compression scheme
- Main Squeeze (disambiguation), in music
