= GSX =

GSX may refer to:

== Businesses ==
- GSX Techedu, a large Chinese online tutoring company
- General Signal, a defunct American equipment manufacturer
- Gibraltar Stock Exchange
- GSX Inc., a technology subsidiary of OpenText

== Science and technology ==
- Gsx (gene family), in animals
- Graphics System Extension, a graphics library
- Government Secure Extranet, United Kingdom

== Television ==
- Asurada GSX, a fictional racing car from Future GPX Cyber Formula

== Music ==
- Genre-Specific Xperience, an EP by electronic musician Fatima Al Qadiri

== Transport and vehicles ==
- Buick GSX, a muscle car
- Gandhi Smarak Road railway station, in Maharashtra, India
- Grand Strand Expressway, a proposed freeway in South Carolina
- Mitsubishi Eclipse GSX, a sport compact car
- Suzuki GSX series of sport touring motorcycles
- Suzuki GSX-R series of sport motorcycles
