= Umbilical ligament =

Umbilical ligament may refer to:

- Median umbilical ligament (Ligamentum umbilicale medianum)
- Medial umbilical ligament (Ligamentum umbilicale mediale)
- Lateral umbilical fold or lateral umbilical ligament
