= Medial umbilical fold =

Peritoneal elevation in the abdomen

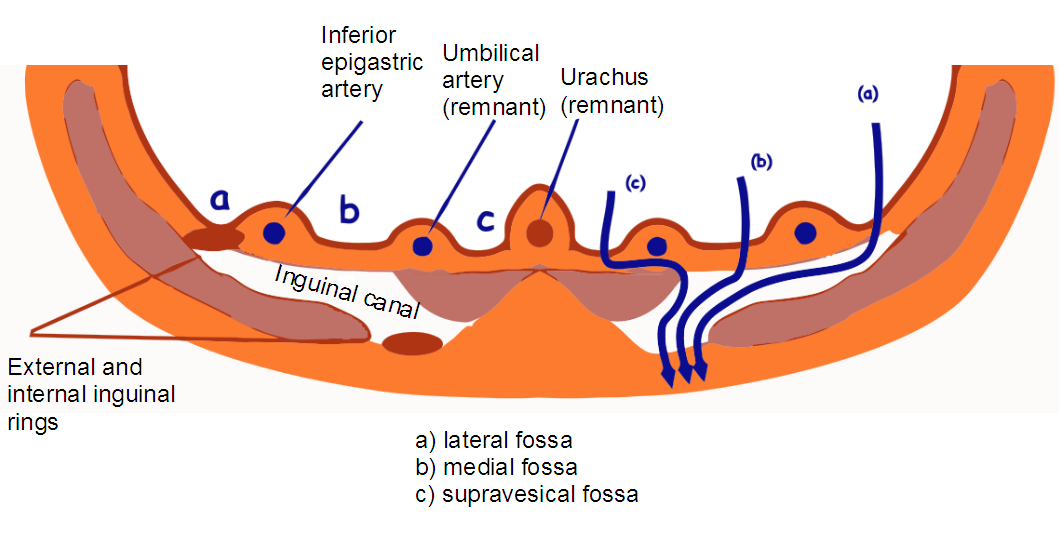
- The medial umbilical fold corresponds to the elevation produced by what is here labelled as "Umbilical artery (remnant)" on this diagram of a transverse section of the lower anterior abdominal wall (note that it is bilaterally paired - though not labelled for other side).

Details

Identifiers
- Latin: plica umbilicalis medialis

The medial umbilical fold is an elevation of the peritoneum (on either side of the body) lining the inner surface of the lower anterior abdominal wall formed by the underlying medial umbilical ligament (the obliterated distal portion of the umbilical artery) which the peritoneum covers. Superiorly, the two medial umbilical folds converge towards the midline to meet and terminate at the umbilicus.

The unpaired midline median umbilical ligament lies medially to each medial umbilical fold; a lateral umbilical fold lies lateral to either medial umbilical fold. A supravesical fossa lies between the median umbilical fold and either medial umbilical fold on either side. A medial inguinal fossa lies between the median umbilical fold and lateral umbilical fold of the same side on either side.
