= Abdominal wall =

Boundary of abdominal cavity

- Body cavities

- Diagram of sheath of rectus above the arcuate line.

Details

Identifiers
- Latin: paries abdominalis
- MeSH: D034861
- FMA: 10429

In anatomy, the abdominal wall represents the boundaries of the abdominal cavity. The abdominal wall is split into the anterolateral and posterior walls.

There is a common set of layers covering and forming all the walls: the deepest being the visceral peritoneum, which covers many of the abdominal organs (most of the large and small intestines, for example), and the parietal peritoneum—which covers the visceral peritoneum below it, the extraperitoneal fat, the transversalis fascia, the internal and external oblique and transversus abdominis aponeurosis, and a layer of fascia, which has different names according to what it covers (e.g., transversalis, psoas fascia).

In medical vernacular, the term 'abdominal wall' most commonly refers to the layers composing the anterior abdominal wall which, in addition to the layers mentioned above, includes the three layers of muscle: the transversus abdominis (transverse abdominal muscle), the internal (obliquus internus) and the external oblique (obliquus externus).

== Structure ==
The contour of the abdominal wall is roughly hexagonal. Its superior border is bounded by the costal margins, lateral borders by mid-axillary lines, and inferior borders bounded by the anterior half of the iliac crest, inguinal ligaments, pubic crest, and pubic symphysis.

== Layers ==
In human anatomy, the layers of the anterolateral abdominal wall are (from superficial to deep):

- Skin
- Subcutaneous tissue
- Fascia
  - Camper's fascia - fatty superficial layer.
  - Scarpa's fascia - deep fibrous layer.
  - Superficial abdominal fascia
- Muscle
  - External oblique abdominal muscle
  - Internal oblique abdominal muscle
  - Rectus abdominis
  - Transverse abdominal muscle
  - Pyramidalis muscle
- Transversalis fascia
- Extraperitoneal fat
- Peritoneum

== Inner surface ==
The surface contains several ligaments separated by fossae:

Ligament/fold	Remnant of	Lateral fossa	Hernia
median umbilical ligament	urachus	supravesical fossa	supravesical hernia (rare)
medial umbilical ligament	umbilical artery	medial inguinal fossa	direct inguinal hernia
lateral umbilical fold	inferior epigastric vessels	lateral inguinal fossa	indirect inguinal hernia

== See also ==
- Abdominal exercise
- Abdominal wall defect
- Human abdomen
- Peritoneum
- Terms for anatomical location
