= Dominic Allen =

Australian director and producer

- Born: November 20, 1980; Australia
- Occupations: Director, producer
- Known for: Documentary filmmaking, virtual reality (VR) productions, feature films
- Notable work: Two Men, Carriberrie VR, Planet Wind
- Awards: Melbourne International Film Festival Emerging Australian Filmmaker Prize (2009); Inside Film Awards Rising Talent Award (2009)

Dominic Allen (born 20 November 1980) is an Australian director and producer whose work includes short and feature films, music videos, commercials, and television documentaries.

In 2005 he was featured in the documentary film RASH, as an Australian street artist.

== Career ==
His documentary films include Estudio 101, about eclectic Australian band The Cat Empire recording their second album in Cuba; One Cup, about Fair Trade Coffee and East Timor; and Squeezed, about the impact of Trade Liberalisation in Asia. In 2009 he had success with a short film titled Two Men and he won the Melbourne International Film Festival Emerging Australian Filmmaker Prize, and the 2009 Inside Film Awards Rising Talent Award.

As a producer of feature films Allen's credits include Shadowplay, 2009, Blind Company, 2009 and Grey Matter, 2011, a Rwandan feature film directed by Kivu Ruhorahoza premiering at Tribeca 2011.

In 2018 Dominic Allen produced the Carriberrie VR, a largescale, immersive song and dance experience featuring more than 150 First Nations Australians singers and dancers and narrated by Jack Charles and David Gulpilil. Carriberrie is now available as an online experience.

In 2022 Allen produced another major VR work, for Melbourne Skydeck's Voyager Theatre which takes participants through 25 locations across Victoria. Along with AFL Grand-final MCG and Melbourne Cup moments, the film is on court with Rafael Nadal as he wins the Australian Open, features a convertible driving the Great Ocean Road, a visit to Bell's Beach, and rides on a Luna Park roller coaster.

In other work beyond traditional screen, in 2020 Allen produced the stage video visuals for Spinifex Gum, an Australian musical collective based in Cairns, consisting of a collaboration among the Indigenous ensemble the Marliya Choir, Felix Riebl and Ollie McGill of the Melbourne band The Cat Empire, Lyn Williams, and Deborah Brown. This group shares the stories of the Yindjibarndi people in the Pilbara region of Western Australia. The Spinifex Gum project is notable for its combination of contemporary songwriting and choral music, involving talented young Indigenous women and girls from Far North Queensland and the Torres Strait. Their work speaks to issues facing First Nations Australians, blending the beauty of Indigenous choral singing with modern musical elements and has played broadly around Australia including major shows with the Sydney Symphony Orchestra and the Sydney Opera House.

In 2023 Allen produced and directed the feature film Planet Wind, which tracks Australian renewable energy pioneer, Andy Evans, as he follows the story of offshore wind across the globe, exploring humans relationship to this planetary force. Planet Wind was shown around Australia in advance of a broader global release in 2024.
