= Cdx =

Group of genes

The Cdx gene family, also called caudal genes, are a group of genes found in many animal genomes. Cdx genes contain a homeobox DNA sequence and code for proteins that act as transcription factors. The gene after which the gene family is named (the founding member) is the caudal or cad gene of the fruitfly Drosophila melanogaster. The human genome has three Cdx genes, called CDX1, CDX2 and CDX4. The zebrafish has no cdx2 gene, but two copies of cdx1 and one copy of cdx4. The Cdx gene in the nematode Caenorhabditis elegans is called pal-1.

The Cdx gene family has been suggested to regulate early mesoderm cell fate decisions The gene’s function has been found to impact both hematopoiesis of the yolk sac and cardiogenesis in zebrafish. Cdx2 specifically is the gene responsible for normal expression of certain cardiogenic transcription factors which regulate cardiac and blood development during embryogenesis. Cdx has been suggested to function with the mesoderm to direct fate decisions of cells through transcription regulation. This suggests that the Cdx gene influences target gene expression through epigenetic control.

Cdx genes play many roles during embryological development. This is particularly seen during the development of the body plan. Cdx genes are transcription factors that are influenced by signaling molecules such as Wnt, Retinoic acid and FGF (fibroblast growth factor) during body plan establishment in the developing embryo. Expression of Cdx is responsible for the control of the Hox gene family, which establishes the body plan posteriorly and anteriorly. The timed release of signaling molecules establishes the anterior/posterior axis formation and facilitates the regression of the primitive node. Hox genes area also critical for the proper orientation of the head, legs, arms, thorax and abdomen. Transfer of this information to Hox genes for positional development works directly through Cdx binding sites. Mutations to these binding sites have shown to ultimately prevent Hox gene expression and affect proper establishment of the body plan by preventing regulation of region-specific expression.

Research demonstrating decreases in Cdx dosage within mice has shown defects in anterior and posterior axis development. This has shown more severe vertebral defects posteriorly as Cdx dosage decreases. Along with this, it has been found that as Cdx dosage decreases, modification of Wnt signaling, and timing of Hox expression causes both neurological and skeletal defects in the posterior vertebra.

Cdx1, Cdx2, and Cdx4 each have individual roles as well as overlapping roles where, if one gene has been knocked out, the others would be able to compensate to some degree to make up for a single gene deficiency. The Cdx genes function more separately in the development of the gut where the knockout of one gene would have a larger impact on the overall development of the embryo. Knockout of the Cdx1 gene would result in a posterior structure such as a rip, developing the morphology of a more anterior rib, but would not result in any gut abnormalities. Knockout of the Cdx2 gene however would result in the same axial homeotic shift and knocking out the Cdx1 gene, but could also prevent trophoblast maturation and blastocyst implantation if the knockout was in both alleles. Cdx2 gene knockout would also result in multiple polyps in the midgut which are related to cancer cells. The function of Cdx4 in gut development is currently unknown since no spontaneous mutations have been observed nor have any knockout experiments been performed.
