= Inguinal fossa =

Inguinal fossa may refer to:

- Lateral inguinal fossa
- Medial inguinal fossa
