= Umbilical-urachal sinus =

- Other names: Urachal sinus
- Specialty: Urology

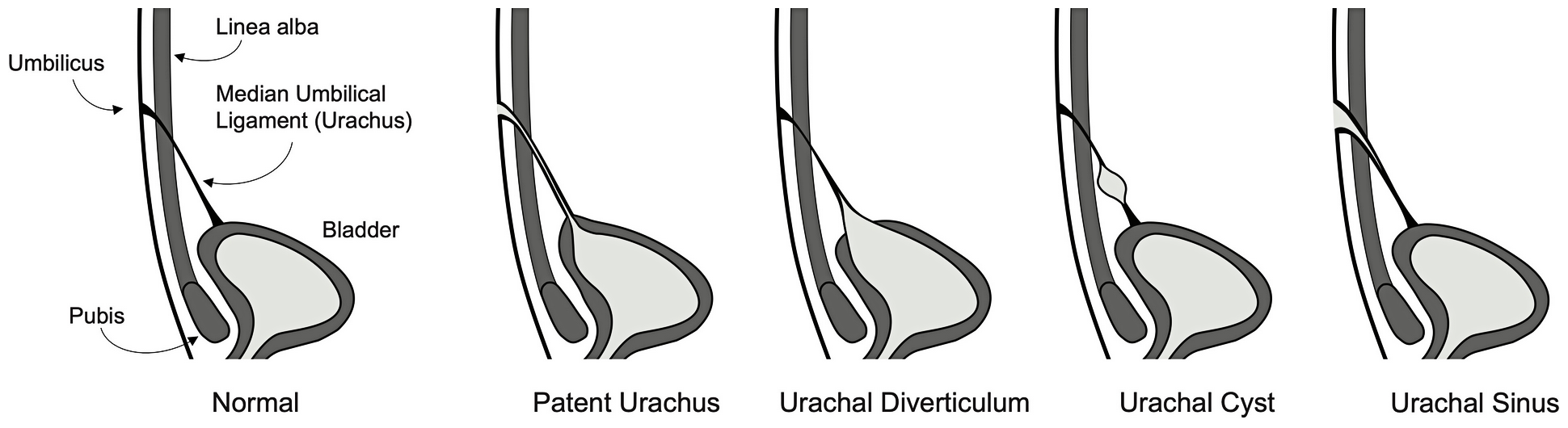
Umbilical urachal sinus

Umbilical-urachal sinus is a congenital disorder of the urinary bladder caused by failure of obliteration of proximal or distal part of the allantois, and the presentation of this anomaly is more common in children and rarer in adults. In contrast to a urachal diverticulum (patent urachus), it is characterised by focal dilatation of the umbilical portion of the remnant urachal tract.

== Background ==
The urachus is a fibroelastic structure that connects the fetal bladder to the umbilicus during development. If the urachus fails to close properly, it can lead to various anomalies, including the umbilical-urachal sinus, which may present as a sinus tract or cyst at the umbilicus.

== History ==
It is thought have been first described by Cabriolus in 1550.

== Complications ==
- Infection, with possible abscess formation.
- Concurrent occurrence of a tumour.
- Development of a urachal cyst
- Potential for malignancy in advanced cases (though rare)

== See also ==
- Urachus
- Urachal fistula
- Urachal cyst
- Urachal diverticulum
