= The Squeeze =

The Squeeze may refer to these films:

- The Squeeze (1977 film), a British gangster thriller
- The Squeeze (1980 film), an Italian heist film
- The Squeeze (1987 film), an American comedy
- The Squeeze (2015 film), an American golfing drama
- The Squeeze (album), a 2017 album by The Road Hammers

== See also ==
- Squeeze (disambiguation)
- The Main Squeeze (disambiguation), band and album
