= Squeezed =

Squeezed may refer to:

- Squeezed (film), a 2007 Australian documentary
- Squeezed (EP), an EP by What Is This?
- Squeezed, an album by Orange Range
- Compression (physical)

== See also ==
- Squeezed coherent state, in physics, a state of the quantum mechanical Hilbert space
- Squeeze (disambiguation)
