= Urachal cancer =

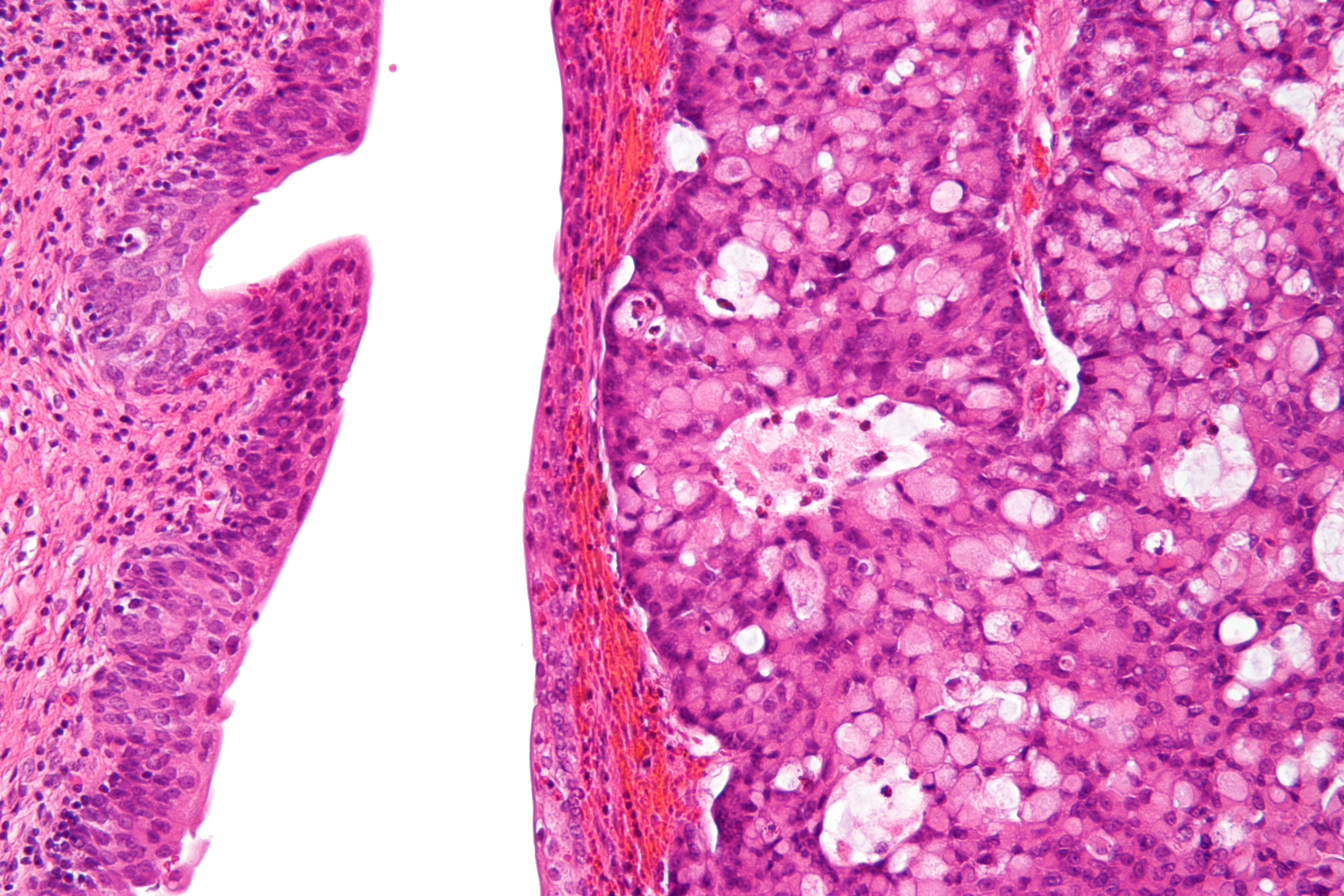
- Micrograph of urachal carcinoma (right of image) and non-malignant urothelium (left of image). H&E stain.
- Specialty: Oncology

Urachal cancer is a very rare type of cancer arising from the urachus or its remnants. The disease might arise from metaplastic glandular epithelium or embryonic epithelial remnants originating from the cloaca region.

It occurs in roughly about one person per 1 million people per year varying on the geographical region. Men are affected slightly more often than women mostly in the 5th decade of life but the disease can occur in also in other age groups.

It can involve the urinary bladder, but is not bladder cancer in the usual sense. Urachal cancer can occur at any site along the urachal tract.

Urachal cancer was mentioned by Hue and Jacquin in 1863 followed by an elaborate work by T. Cullen in 1916 about diseases of the umbilicus, while C. Begg further characterized urachal cancer in the 1930s. Detailed diagnostic and staging schemes were proposed by Sheldon et al. in 1984, which remain widely used today.

== Classification ==
Urachal cancer usually is an adenocarcinoma (about 90%) mostly with mucinous/colloidal histology. Other rare types include urothelial carcinoma, squamous cell carcinoma, neuroendocrine carcinoma and sarcoma.

== Symptoms and Signs ==
Urachal cancer can exist for some years without any symptoms. The most frequent initial symptom is haematuria which occurs when the urachal tumour has penetrated the bladder wall, but mucinuria (mucin in the urine), local pain or swelling, recurrent local or urinary tract infections and umbilical discharge can (but is not always) be seen.

== Diagnosis ==
According to the American Urological Association, the diagnostic criteria are the following:

1. The location of the tumor is mostly at the bladder dome.
2. No findings of cystitis glandularis on the bladder surface. These findings can be precursor lesions of a primary bladder adenocarcinoma.
3. No history of a different primary adenocarcinoma with the same morphology.

Tissue for histological analysis is usually obtained via a transurethral resection of bladder tumor (TURBT).

=== Histopathological Diagnosis ===
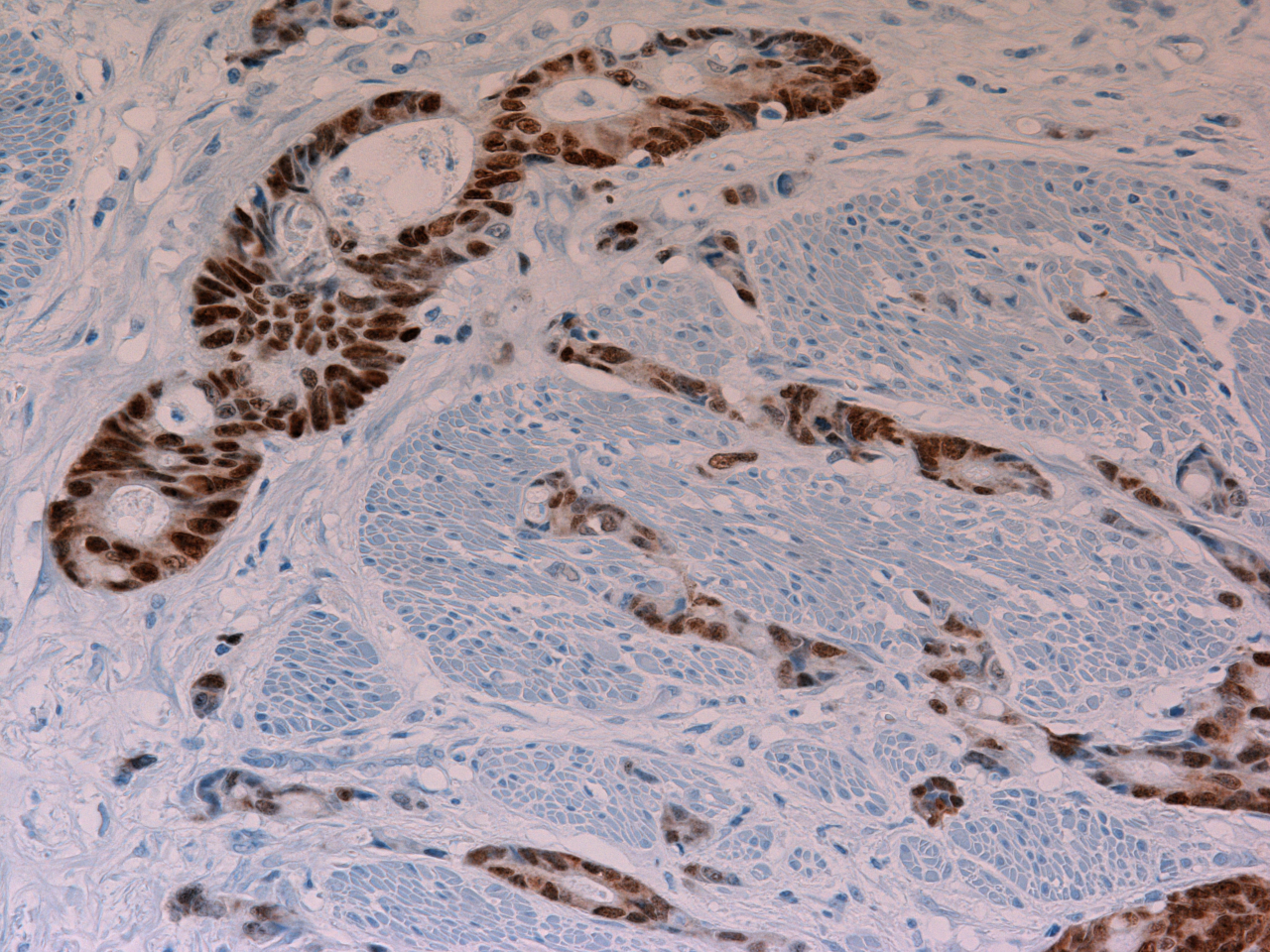
A case of urachal adenocarcinoma demonstrating immunohistochemical CDX2-positivity with typical nuclear staining. 200x magnification.

According to the current version (4th ed.) of the WHO classification of Tumours of the Urinary System, the diagnosis of a urachal adenocarcinoma usually needs a location of the tumor in the bladder dome and/or anterior wall, epicenter of the tumor in the bladder wall, absence of widespread cystitis cystica and/or cystitis glandularis beyond the dome or anterior wall, and absence of another similar structured tumor as a primary tumor elsewhere in the body. A urachal remnant in association with the tumor can help with the diagnosis. In addition, other diagnostic systems also for urachal carcinomas that are not adenocarcinomas have been proposed.

Immunohistochemical stains are usually less helpful in the histopathological differential diagnosis of urachal adenocarcinomas.

=== Imaging ===
CT and MRI scans are useful to evaluate local invasion and metastasis to lymph nodes and other parts of the body. Besides, in 32 to 46% of the cases, they show calcifications which is very suggestive of the disease.

== Treatment ==
Surgical management is en bloc resection of bladder, urachal remnant, and umbilicus. In progressed stages, radiotherapy seems not to lead to sufficient response rates. However, chemotherapy regimes containing 5-FU (and Cisplatin) have been described to be useful in these cases. In recent years, targeted therapies have been demonstrated to be useful in reports of single cases. These agents included Sunitinib, Gefitinib, Bevacizumab and Cetuximab.

=== Serum Markers for Monitoring ===
Measurement of serum concentrations of CEA, CA19-9 and CA125 can be helpful in monitoring urachal cancer

== Outcomes ==
The 5-year survival is estimated between 25 and 61%. Worse prognostic factors include the presence of residual tumor at the margin of the resection specimen (R+), invasion of the peritoneum and metastatic disease.
