= Gsx (gene family) =

Group of genes found in many animals

The Gsx gene family are a group of genes found in many, but not all, animals. Gsx genes contain a homeobox DNA sequence and code for proteins that act as transcription factors. The human genome has two Gsx genes, called GSX1 and GSX2 (formerly GSH1 and GSH2), while the fruitfly Drosophila has a single Gsx gene called ind. Vertebrate Gsx genes are implicated in neural patterning. In many animals, Gsx genes can be part of a ParaHox gene cluster.
