= Short interest ratio =

Financial ratio

The short interest ratio (also called days-to-cover ratio) represents the number of days it takes short sellers on average to cover their positions, that is repurchase all of the borrowed shares. It is calculated by dividing the number of shares sold short by the average daily trading volume, generally over the last 30 trading days. The ratio is used by fundamental and technical traders to identify trends.

The days-to-cover ratio can also be calculated for an entire exchange to determine the sentiment of the market as a whole. If an exchange has a high days-to-cover ratio of around five or greater, this can be taken as a bearish signal, and vice versa.

The short interest ratio is not to be confused with the short interest, a similar concept whereby the number of shares sold short is divided by the number of shares outstanding. The latter concept does not take liquidity into account.

== Short squeeze (a.k.a. Bear Squeeze) ==
A short squeeze can occur if the price of stock with a high short interest begins to have increased demand and a strong upward trend. To cut their losses, short sellers may add to demand by buying shares to cover short positions, causing the share price to further escalate temporarily.

In markets with an active options market short sellers can hedge against the risk of a short squeeze by buying call options. Conversely, short squeezes are more likely to occur in stocks with small market capitalization and a small public float.
