= Urachal diverticulum =

- Specialty: Urology

A urachal diverticulum (also vesicourachal diverticulum) is a congenital disorder caused by the partial persistence of the allantois. The allantois, which later becomes the urachus, connects an embryo's bladder to the yolk sac. Normally, the urachus closes off to become the median umbilical ligament; however, if it does not seal close to the bladder, a blind pouch connected to the bladder remains. This is usually asymptomatic but can lead to recurrent urinary tract infections. If the urachus is wholly patent, urine can drain from the bladder to an opening by the umbilicus, a condition known as urachal fistula.
