= Homeobox protein CDX-2 =

Protein found in humans

CDX2

Identifiers
- Aliases: CDX2, CDX-3, CDX2/AS, CDX3, caudal type homeobox 2, Cdx2
- External IDs: OMIM: 600297; MGI: 88361; GeneCards: CDX2

Gene location (Human)
Chr.	Chromosome 13 (human)
Band	13q12.2	Start	27,960,918 bp
Band	13q12.2	End	27,969,315 bp

Gene location (Mouse)
Chr.	Chromosome 5 (mouse)
Band	5 G3|5 86.86 cM	Start	147,237,615 bp
Band	5 G3|5 86.86 cM	End	147,244,080 bp
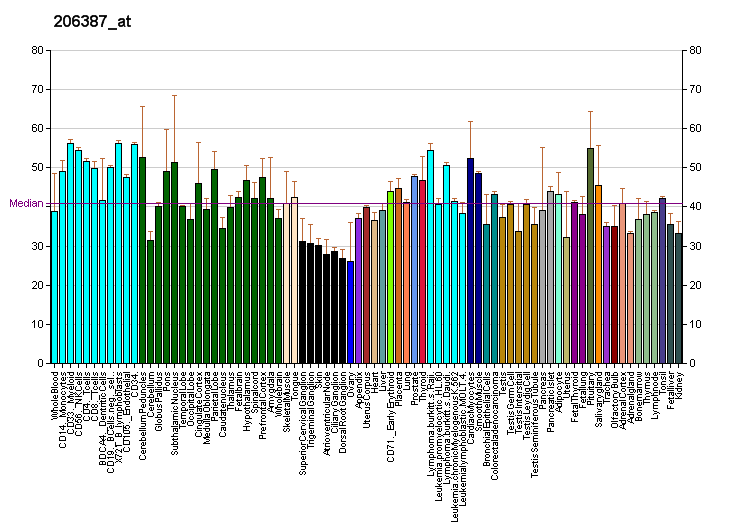
RNA expression pattern
Bgee	Human / Mouse (ortholog); Top expressed in: mucosa of transverse colon; rectum; duodenum; epithelium of colon; mucosa of ileum; mucosa of sigmoid colon; appendix; jejunal mucosa; body of pancreas; islet of Langerhans / Top expressed in: Paneth cell; tail of embryo; crypt of lieberkuhn of small intestine; primitive streak; migratory enteric neural crest cell; ileum; jejunum; duodenum; Epithelium of large intestine; left colon; More reference expression data
BioGPS	More reference expression data
Gene ontology
Molecular function	RNA polymerase II cis-regulatory region sequence-specific DNA binding; DNA binding; sequence-specific DNA binding; transcription corepressor activity; DNA-binding transcription factor activity; DNA-binding transcription repressor activity, RNA polymerase II-specific; double-stranded DNA binding; DNA-binding transcription factor activity, RNA polymerase II-specific; methyl-CpG binding; RNA polymerase II transcription regulatory region sequence-specific DNA binding
Cellular component	transcription repressor complex; nucleoplasm; condensed nuclear chromosome; nucleus; protein-containing complex
Biological process	pattern specification process; cell differentiation; regulation of transcription, DNA-templated; regulation of somitogenesis; somatic stem cell population maintenance; endosome to lysosome transport; placenta development; regulation of transcription by RNA polymerase II; labyrinthine layer development; negative regulation of transcription by RNA polymerase II; transcription by RNA polymerase II; transcription, DNA-templated; positive regulation of transcription, DNA-templated; multicellular organism development; blood vessel development; trophectodermal cell differentiation; establishment or maintenance of epithelial cell apical/basal polarity; positive regulation of cell differentiation; intestinal epithelial cell differentiation; positive regulation of cell population proliferation; animal organ morphogenesis; anterior/posterior axis specification; blastocyst development; anterior/posterior pattern specification
Sources:Amigo / QuickGO
Orthologs
Databases	NCBI: entry; OMA: entry
Species	Human	Mouse
Entrez	1045	12591
Ensembl	ENSG00000165556	ENSMUSG00000029646
UniProt	Q99626	P43241
RefSeq (mRNA)	NM_001265; NM_001354700	NM_007673
RefSeq (protein)	NP_001256; NP_001341629	NP_031699
Location (UCSC)	Chr 13: 27.96 – 27.97 Mb	Chr 5: 147.24 – 147.24 Mb
PubMed search
- Wikidata
View/Edit Human	View/Edit Mouse

Homeobox protein CDX-2 is a protein that in humans is encoded by the CDX2 gene. The CDX-2 protein is a homeobox transcription factor expressed in the nuclei of intestinal epithelial cells, playing an essential role in the development and function of the digestive system. CDX2 is part of the ParaHox gene cluster, a group of three highly conserved developmental genes present in most vertebrate species. Together with CDX1 and CDX4, CDX2 is one of three caudal-related genes in the human genome.

== Function ==
In common with the two other Cdx genes, CDX2 regulates several essential processes in the development and function of the lower gastrointestinal tract (from the duodenum to the anus) in vertebrates. In vertebrate embryonic development, CDX2 becomes active in endodermal cells that are posterior to the developing stomach. These cells eventually form the intestinal epithelium. The activity of CDX2 at this stage is essential for the correct formation of the intestine and the anus. CDX2 is also required for the development of the placenta.

Later in development, CDX2 is expressed in intestinal epithelial stem cells, which are cells that continuously differentiate into the cells that form the intestinal lining. This differentiation is dependent on CDX2, as illustrated by experiments where the expression of this gene was knocked-out or overexpressed in mice. Heterozygous CDX2 knock-outs have intestinal lesions caused by the differentiation of intestinal cells into gastric epithelium; this can be considered a form of homeotic transformation. Conversely, the over-expression of CDX2 leads to the formation of intestinal epithelium in the stomach.

In addition to roles in endoderm, CDX2 is also expressed in very early stages of mouse and human embryonic development, specifically marking the trophectoderm lineage of cells in the blastocyst of mouse and human. Trophectoderm cells contribute to the placenta.

== Pathology ==
Ectopic expression of CDX2 was reported in more than 85% of the human patients with acute myeloid leukemia (AML). Ectopic expression of Cdx2 in murine bone marrow induced AML in mice and upregulate Hox genes in bone marrow progenitors. CDX2 is also implicated in the pathogenesis of Barrett's esophagus where it has been shown that components from gastroesophageal reflux such as bile acids are able to induce the expression of an intestinal differentiation program through up-regulation of NF-κB and CDX2.

== Biomarker for intestinal cancer ==
CDX2 is also used in diagnostic surgical pathology as a marker for gastrointestinal differentiation, especially colorectal.

== Possible use in stem cell research ==
This gene (or, more specifically, the equivalent gene in humans) has come up in the proposal by the President's Council on Bioethics, as a solution to the stem cell controversy. According to one of the plans put forth, by deactivating the gene, it would not be possible for a properly organized embryo to form, thus providing stem cells without requiring the destruction of an embryo. Other genes that have been proposed for this purpose include Hnf4, which is required for gastrulation.

== Interactions ==
CDX2 has been shown to interact with EP300, and PAX6.
