= Medial umbilical ligament =

Ligamentous remnant of umbilical artery

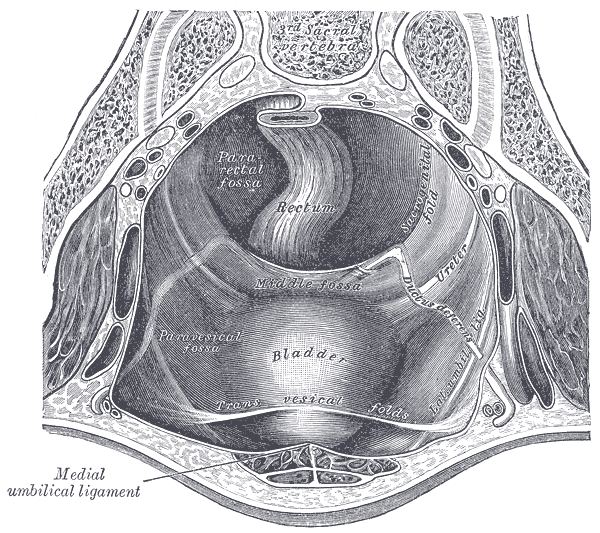
- The peritoneum of the male pelvis. (Medial umbilical ligament labeled at bottom left.)

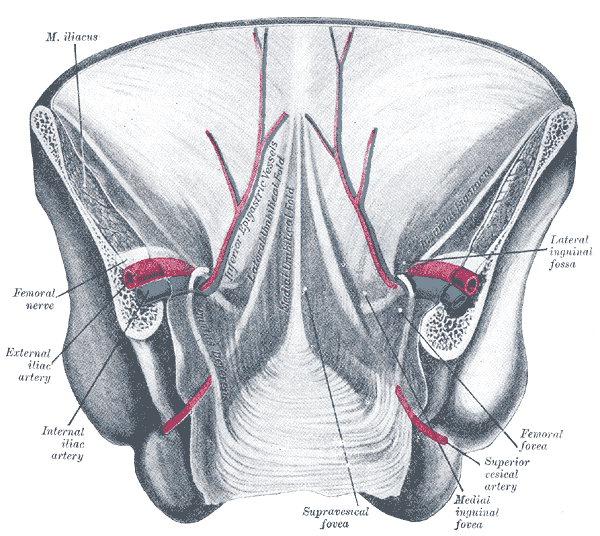
- Posterior view of the anterior abdominal wall in its lower half. The peritoneum is in place, and the various cords are shining through.

Details
- Source: Internal iliac artery
- To: Superior vesical artery, artery to the ductus deferens
- Nerve: Superior hypogastric plexus

Identifiers
- Latin: chorda arteriae umbilicalis, ligamentum umbilicale mediale
- TA98: A12.2.15.026

The medial umbilical ligament, cord of umbilical artery, or obliterated umbilical artery is a paired structure found in human anatomy. It is on the deep surface of the anterior abdominal wall, and is covered by the medial umbilical folds (plicae umbilicales mediales). It is different from the median umbilical ligament, a structure that represents the remnant of the embryonic urachus.

== Origins ==
It represents the remnant of the umbilical arteries, which serves no purpose in humans after birth, except for the initial part that becomes the adult superior vesical artery. The occluded part of umbilical artery becomes the medial umbilical ligament postnatal.

The medial umbilical ligament arises from the anterior division of the internal iliac artery.

== Functions ==
It may be used as a landmark for surgeons performing laparoscopic procedures to help identify and avoid damaging the inferior epigastric arteries during port placement. Other than this, it has no purpose in an adult and it may be cut or damaged with impunity.

== Relations ==
The supravesical fossa, and therefore a supravesical hernia, is medial to this structure. The medial inguinal fossa, and therefore a direct inguinal hernia, is lateral to it.

== See also ==
- median umbilical ligament (originating from urachus)
- lateral umbilical ligament
- Umbilical fascia

== Additional images ==
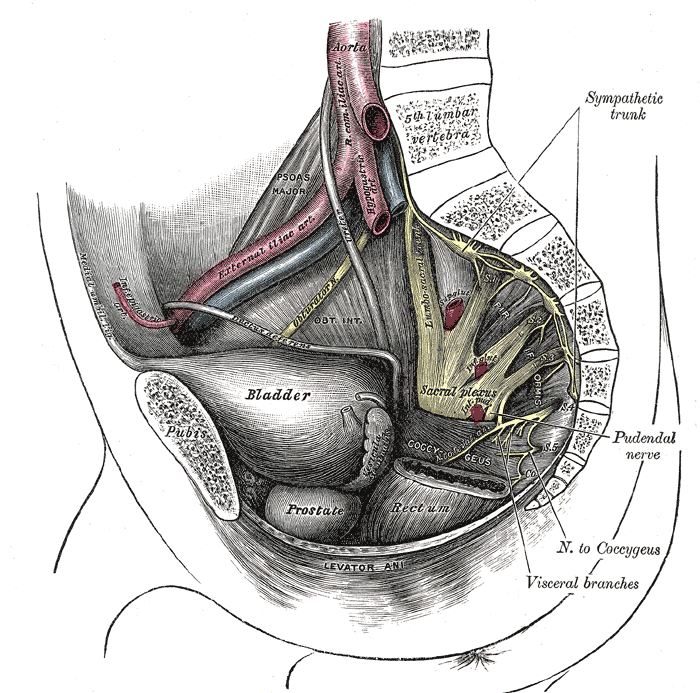
Dissection of side wall of pelvis showing sacral and pudendal plexuses.

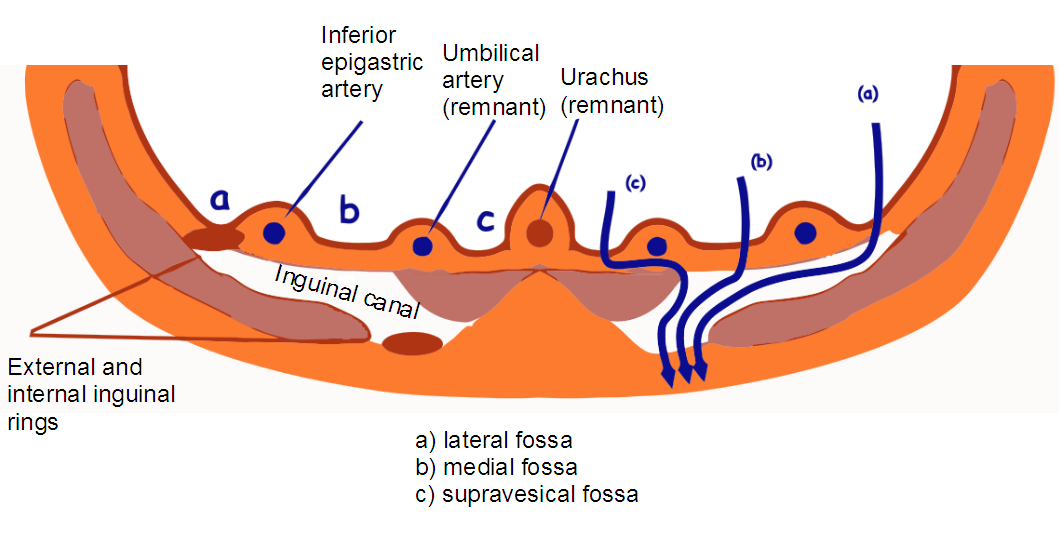
Inguinal fossae
