= Squeeze play =

Squeeze play may refer to:

== In games and sports ==
- Squeeze play (baseball)
- Squeeze play (bridge)
- Squeeze play (poker)

== Arts and media ==
- Squeeze Play (album), a 1956 album by John Serry, Sr
- Squeeze Play!, a 1979 comedy film
- "Squeeze Play" (song), by Snoop Dogg
- Squeeze Play (The Price Is Right), a segment game from The Price Is Right
- Squeeze Play (novel), a 1990 baseball novel by Jane Leavy
- Squeeze Play, a 1982 novel by Paul Auster (writing as Paul Benjamin)
- "Squeeze Play" (Magnum, P.I.), a 1983 television episode
- Squeezeplay, a Transformers character in the Headmaster sub-group

== Other uses ==
- Operation Squeeze Play, a 2005 military operation in the Iraq War

== See also ==
- Play (Squeeze album)
- Squeeze (disambiguation)
