= Gondwana Choirs =

Australian choral ensembles for young people

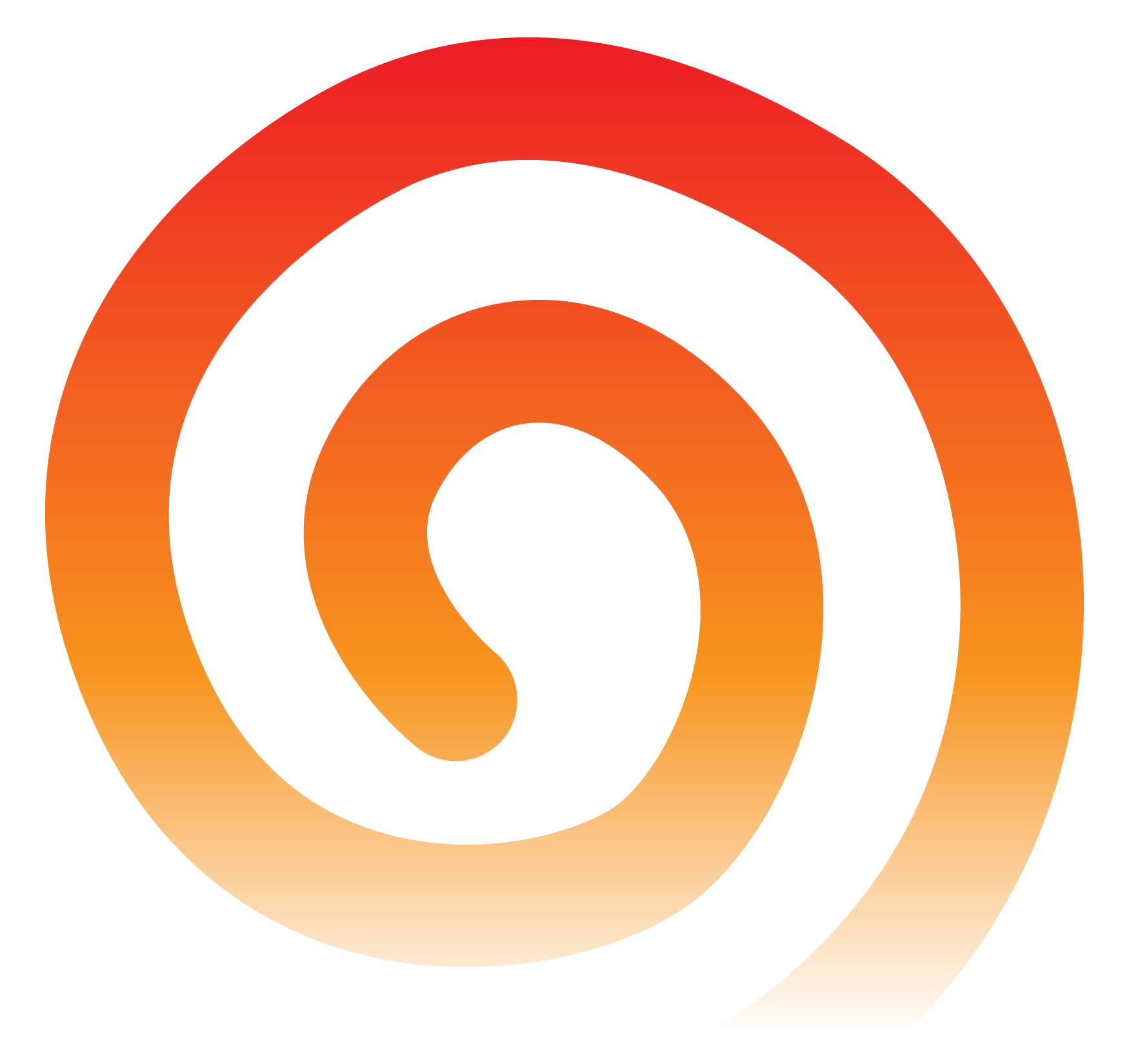
- Formation: 1989
- Founder: Lyn Williams AM
- Headquarters: Wharf 4, 15 Hickson Road, Dawes Point NSW 2000
- Artistic Director: Lyn Williams AM
- Executive Director: Louisa O’Toole
- Website: https://www.gondwana.org.au

Gondwana Choirs is an Australian national choral organisation. It was founded in 1989 as Sydney Children’s Choir by Lyn Williams AM, who is its artistic director. The choirs' rehearsal studios are located at the Walsh Bay Arts Precinct in Dawes Point.

Gondwana Choirs includes several ensembles:

- The Sydney Children's Choir: The choir often commission and performed works by Australian composers, and has performed regularly with the Sydney Symphony Orchestra over its history. The choir has performed at events such as the Opening Ceremony of the Sydney Olympic Games. Its other performing ensembles include the SCC Young Men's Choir, for tenors and basses with changing and changed voices, and the SCC Junior Performing Choir. The choir's membership includes approximately 500 young people across training and performing ensembles.
- The Cairns-based Gondwana Indigenous Children's Choir caters for First Nations young people aged 8–16. The choir often perform in First Nations languages and have recorded film projects on country. The choir has performed with Archie Roach, Uncle Seaman Dan, Jessica Mauboy and the Australian Chamber Orchestra and at events such as the NAIDOC Gala Ball and G20 Finance Ministers' Summit.
- Marliya, whose singers includes current and former members of the Gondwana Indigenous Children's Choir was formed for a collaboration with members of The Cat Empire, Felix Riebel and Ollie McGill, with a series of festival shows and albums as the ensemble Spinifex Gum.
- Gondwana National Choirs audition nation-wide and meet for an annual season of intensive rehearsals and performances at Gondwana National Choral School in Sydney. Two of their choirs, Gondwana Voices and Gondwana Chorale, also regularly tour. In 2023, Gondwana Voices is Ensemble in Residence with the Melbourne Symphony Orchestra.
