= Cdx protein family =

Protein family

The Cdx protein family is a group of the transcription factor proteins which bind to DNA to regulate the expression of genes. In particular this family of proteins can regulate the Hox genes. They are regulators of embryonic development and hematopoiesis in vertebrates, and are also involved in the development of some types of gastrointestinal cancers and leukemias.

== Cdx proteins ==
Humans have three genes (CDX1, CDX2, and CDX4) that encode the caudal proteins:

- Cdx1 protein
- Cdx2 protein
- Cdx4 protein

The human Cdx2 family protein has 94% identity with the mouse Cdx2 and the hamster Cdx3.

== Cdx proteins and regulation of Hox gene expression ==
Cdx proteins are key regulators of Hox genes. The vertebrate Cdx proteins act upstream of Hox genes. Cdx genes integrate the posteriorizing signals from retinoic acid and Wnt canonical pathways and relay this information to Hox promoters.

== Expression in mouse embryo ==
Cdx2 expression begins at 3.5 days and is confined to the trophectoderm, being absent from the inner cell mass. From 8.5 days, Cdx2 begins to be expressed in embryonic tissues, principally in the posterior part of the gut from its earliest formation.

== See also ==
- Neural tube
- Protein family
- Transcription factor
