= Umbilical fascia =

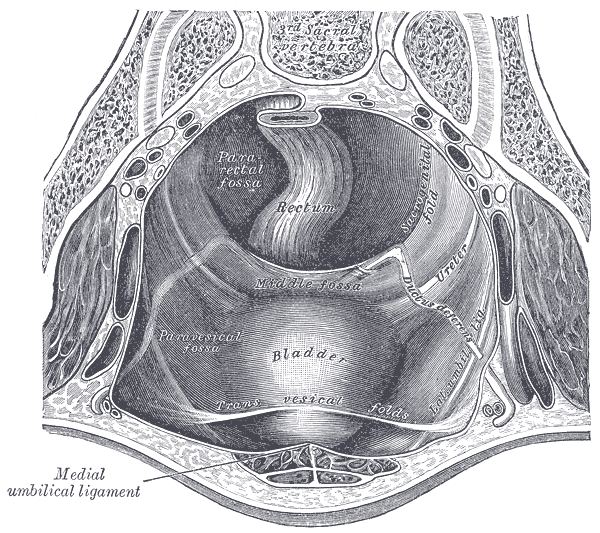
- The peritoneum of the male pelvis. Medial umbilical ligament, which delineates the umbilical fascia, is labeled at bottom left.)

Identifiers
- TA98: A04.5.02.014
- TA2: 2393
- FMA: 76759

The umbilical fascia (or umbilicovesical fascia) is a thin fascial layer that extends between the medial umbilical ligaments from the umbilicus, and extends inferiorly, becoming continuous with the visceral fascia enclosing the urinary bladder.
