= Squeezebox (disambiguation) =

Squeezebox is a class of musical instruments including accordions and concertinas.

Squeezebox or Squeeze box may also refer to:

- "Squeeze Box" (song), a 1975 song by the Who
- Squeezebox (network music player), a digital audio streaming device
- Hug machine or squeeze box, a therapeutic stress-relieving device
- Squeeze box (magic trick), an illusion where the magician or his assistant has his head right next to his feet after entering a box that squeezes
- A segment of the musical piece "Acadian Songs and Dances", composed by Virgil Thomson (1896–1989); from the film "Louisiana Story" (1948)
- Squeeze Box: The Complete Works of "Weird Al" Yankovic, a 2017 box set by American parodist "Weird Al" Yankovic
