= Squeezed (film) =

- Theatrical release poster
- Directed by: Dominic Allen, Michael Cebon
- Release date: September 2007
- Country: Australia
- Language: English

Squeezed: The Cost of Free Trade in the Asia-Pacific is a 2007 film produced by Global Trade Watch (Australia) and Scarab Studio.

Squeezed was filmed in Thailand and the Philippines in July 2007, and publicly screened for the first time in September 2007, at events leading up to the 2007 APEC summit in Sydney, Australia.

According to its producers, "Squeezed tells the story of how globalisation and free trade agreements are changing the lives of millions of people living in the Asia-Pacific region. . . . A short film of contrasts and contradictions, Squeezed is an emotional document of the impact of globalisation on people in the Asia-Pacific, and their responses to it."

A review by international civil society organisation GRAIN declared that the film "captures the havoc that poverty wreaks on more and more people each day, from farmers to slum dwellers, from small dairy operators to the region’s tens of millions of children."
