= Lyn Williams =

Australian choral conductor and composer

Lyn Adrienne Williams, AM (born 1963) is an Australian choral conductor and the founder and artistic director of the Gondwana Choirs. She has been recognised for her significant contribution to the development of choral music for young people in Australia

== Career ==
Williams was born in France and her family returned to Australia in 1969. She attended the Conservatorium High School in Sydney, and studied the harp. She later studied at Oberlin College, Ohio.

Williams founded the Sydney Children's Choir in 1989, and since then has developed further ensembles known as the Gondwana Choirs, including Gondwana Voices, Gondwana Chorale, Gondwana Indigenous Choir, Marliya and Spinifex Gum, a musical collective based in Cairns.

Under her leadership, the Gondwana Choirs have commissioned new choral works, many of which involve Australian composers and Aboriginal and Torres Strait Islander languages.

== Awards and honours ==
In 2017, Williams was awarded the Don Banks Music Award. She received the Medal of the Order of Australia in 2004 and was promoted to Member of the Order of Australia (AM) in 2019.

In 2021 she received the Sir Bernard Heinze Memorial Award for her 30 years' leadership of the Gondwana Choirs. She was nominated for the 2021 NSW Australian of the Year, and was honoured with the Richard Gill Award for Distinguished Services to Australian Music at the 2024 Art Music Awards.
