= Extraperitoneal fascia =

Details

Identifiers
- Latin: fascia extraperitonealis, fascia subperitonealis

Extraperitoneal fascia (also: endoabdominal fascia or subperitoneal fascia) is a fascial plane – consisting mostly of loose areolar connective tissue – situated between the fascial linings of the walls of the abdominal and pelvic cavities (transversalis fascia, anterior layer of thoracolumbar fascia, iliac fascia, and psoas fascia) externally, and the parietal peritoneum internally. Its quality and quantity varies considerably. It occupies the extraperitoneal space.

== Preperitoneal space ==
Anteriorly, it forms the thin and fibrous preperitoneal fascia that is interposed between the transversalis fascia, and the parietal peritoneum. The preperitoneal fascia contains a variable amount of fat, loose connective tissue, and membranous tissue. It is provided with its own blood supply. The membranous component lies just deep to the transversalis fascia and has been construed as a second layer of the transversalis fascia by some authors.

== Retroperitoneal space ==
Posteriorly, it forms the thick and fatty pararenal fascia that surrounds the kidneys.
