= Gandhi Smarak Road railway station =

Railway station in Maharashtra, India

General information
- Location: Akola, Maharashtra; India
- Coordinates: 20.9120615°N 77.0190468°E
- Elevation: 259 metres (850 ft)
- System: Indian Railways station
- Owner: Indian Railways
- Operator: South Central Railway
- Platforms: 1
- Tracks: 2 (metre gauge)
- Connections: Auto stand

Construction
- Structure type: Standard (on ground station)
- Parking: Yes
- Cycle facilities: Yes

Other information
- Status: Functioning
- Station code: GSX
- Zone(s): South Central Railway
- Division(s): Nanded
Location
- Location within India Location within Maharashtra

Gandhi Smarak Road railway station is a small railway station in Akola district, Maharashtra. Its code is GSX. The station consists of one platform. The platform is not well sheltered. It lacks many facilities including water and sanitation.

== Trains ==
Some of the trains that run from Gandhi Smarak Road are:

- Akola–Mhow MG Passenger (unreserved)
- Akola–Mhow MG Fast Passenger
