= Spinifex Gum =

Australian musical group

- Origin: Cairns, Queensland, Australia
- Years active: 2015–present
- Members: Ollie McGill; Felix Riebl; Marliya Choir
- Website: www.spinifexgum.com/home/

Spinifex Gum are an Australian musical collective based in Cairns, a collaboration between the Indigenous ensemble the Marliya Choir, Felix Riebl and Ollie McGill of the Melbourne band The Cat Empire, Lyn Williams, and Deborah Brown. The performers share the stories of the Yindjibarndi people in the Pilbara region of Western Australia.

== Origin ==
Spinifex Gum has its origins in a 2014 visit by the Gondwana Indigenous Children's Choir and the founder of Gondwana Choirs, Lyn Williams, to the Pilbara, inviting Melbourne musician Felix Riebl. The group met and began a collaboration with the Yindjibarndi community, and Riebl returned seven times over the following seven years to learn the stories of the community and their ancestors.

In 2015 Riebl was commissioned by Gondwana Choirs to compose an original work inspired by the Pilbara region. He worked with his friend and Cat Empire bandmate Ollie McGill and the Marliya Choir, a group formed from the Indigenous Children's Choir for the project and comprising female Aboriginal and Torres Strait Islander teenagers from the Cairns region.

They premiered Spinifex Gum – a Song Cycle in 2016.

== Ensemble ==
Spinifex Gum has approximately 30 members, with 12 to 18 performing on stage. The all-female ensemble is aged between 12 and 20, and sings in English and Yindjibarndi. Riebl and McGill act as composers and creative directors for Spinifex Gum, Lyn Williams is the choir director and Deborah Brown, formerly of Bangarra Dance Theatre, is the choreographer. Their songs tell traditional stories of the Yindjibarndi people, protest the treatment of Indigenous Australians by the justice system, and decry the effect of dams and mining in the Pilbara, such as the threats to the Weelumurra Caves and the destruction of Juukan Gorge. Unlike a traditional choir, each singer has an individual microphone, and their choral harmonies are combined with recorded environmental samples of the Pilbara region over contemporary pop basslines.

== Performances and recordings ==
The song cycle was recorded as the studio album Spinifex Gum in 2017, and toured with activists and artists Emma Donovan, Midnight Oil's Peter Garrett, and Adam Briggs. The group also released a single with Briggs, "Locked Up", and another, "Mrs Dhu", both protesting the treatment of incarcerated Indigenous people.

In March 2018, Spinifex Gum performed with Emma Donovan and Peter Garrett at Her Majesty's Theatre in Adelaide, as part of the Adelaide Festival.

The group's second album, Sisters, was released in 2019. It included a cover of the song "Dream Baby Dream", sung in English and Yindjibarndi; the song incorporated the voices of 10,000 Australians as part of the Dream Baby Dream campaign, a petition for First Nations representation in parliament.

Spinifex Gum's third album was a live recording of a sold-out 2019 Sydney Opera House performance, and was released as Spinifex Gum Live at Sydney Opera House in January 2021. A highlight of the live performance was Emma Donovan's performance of Tom Waits' "Make It Rain", singing the final verse in Yindjibarndi. Waits praised the rendition as "gorgeous" and posted the video to his YouTube channel.

Spinifex Gum performed with the Adelaide Symphony Orchestra at the opening night concert of the 2023 Adelaide Festival in Elder Park, Adelaide, on 3 March 2023.

== Awards ==
- Nominated for the 2019 Helpmann Award for Best New Australian Work
- Cannes Lions Grand Prix in for the Apple Inc. Commercial "The Greatest" featuring the bands track "I am the Greatest"

== Discography ==
- "Locked Up" (single) (2017)
- "Mrs Dhu" (single) (2017)
- Spinifex Gum (2017)
- Sisters (2019)
- Spinifex Gum Live at Sydney Opera House (2021)
