= Supravesical fossa =

Anatomical area in the lower abdomen

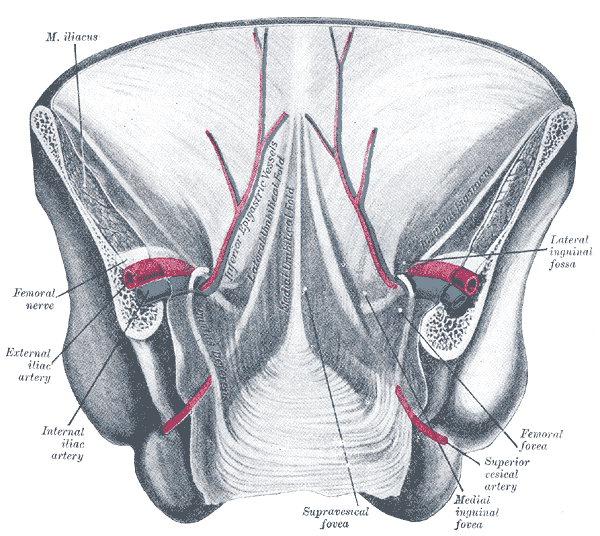
- Posterior view of the anterior abdominal wall in its lower half. The peritoneum is in place, and the various cords are shining through.

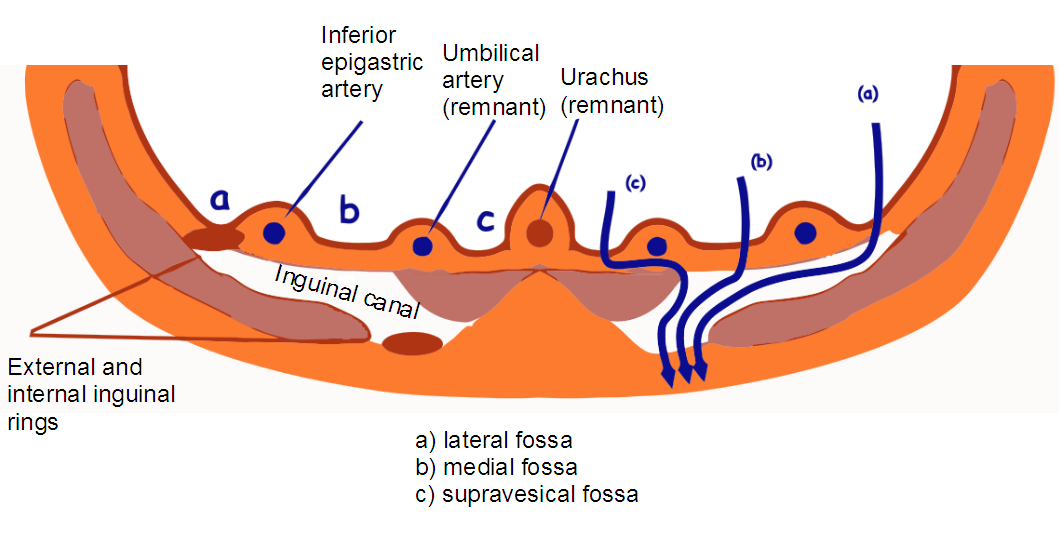
- Inguinal fossae

Details

Identifiers
- Latin: fossa supravesicalis, fovea supravesicalis
- TA98: A10.1.02.430
- TA2: 3792
- FMA: 21051

The supravesical fossa is a depression upon the inner (i.e. peritoneal) surface of the anterior abdominal wall superior to the bladder formed by a reflection of the peritoneum onto the superior surface of the bladder. It is bounded by the medial umbilical fold and median umbilical fold.

The level of the supravesicular fossa varies according to the fullness of the bladder as the peritoneum is not firmly attached to the upper surface of the bladder (the only region where this is the case).
