= Long squeeze =

Decline in a stock caused by long sellers cutting their losses by selling stock

A long squeeze is price decline where leveraged long positions are forced to liquidate. The squeeze is often caused by a liquidation cascade where the forced sale of the asset lowers the price and forces more leveraged positions to be sold off. It can also be caused by hitting spot stop losses. Automatic sales can cause the price to sharply decline with disregard to market sentiment. It is the mirror opposite market reaction of a short squeeze. Unlike longs, shorts require borrowing the asset which can add a different dimension to how long and short squeezes operate. Some investors may see the rapid decline in price as irrational and a buying opportunity (more often than a rapid rise in price seen as a shorting opportunity). However, in times of significant market turmoil, identifying a long squeeze becomes of more practical interest rather than merely an investment opportunity. In 2008, Bear Stearns was wiped out after market rumors that the company had cash concerns. Investors started selling the scrip, resulting in a long squeeze, which triggered many other stop order losses and accelerated the decline of the company's stock.

In 2020, the oil futures market saw a long squeeze when the price of near-month futures for West Texas Intermediate oil fell below $0, causing long holders to be margin-called, forcing the price lower and triggering additional margin-calls, in a manner similar to a classic short squeeze, eventually reaching a bottom of $-37.63 per barrel, before later recovering to nearly $3.

== See also ==
- Fire sale
