= Lateral inguinal fossa =

Shallow depression in the lower abdomen

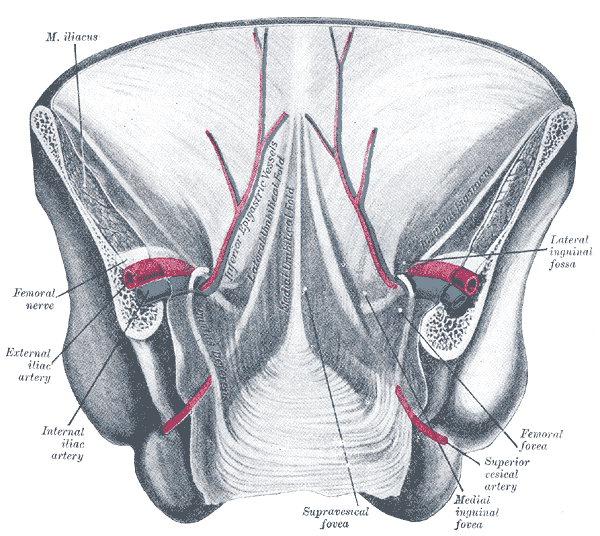
- Posterior view of the anterior abdominal wall in its lower half. The peritoneum is in place, and the various cords are shining through. (Lateral inguinal fossa labeled at center right.)

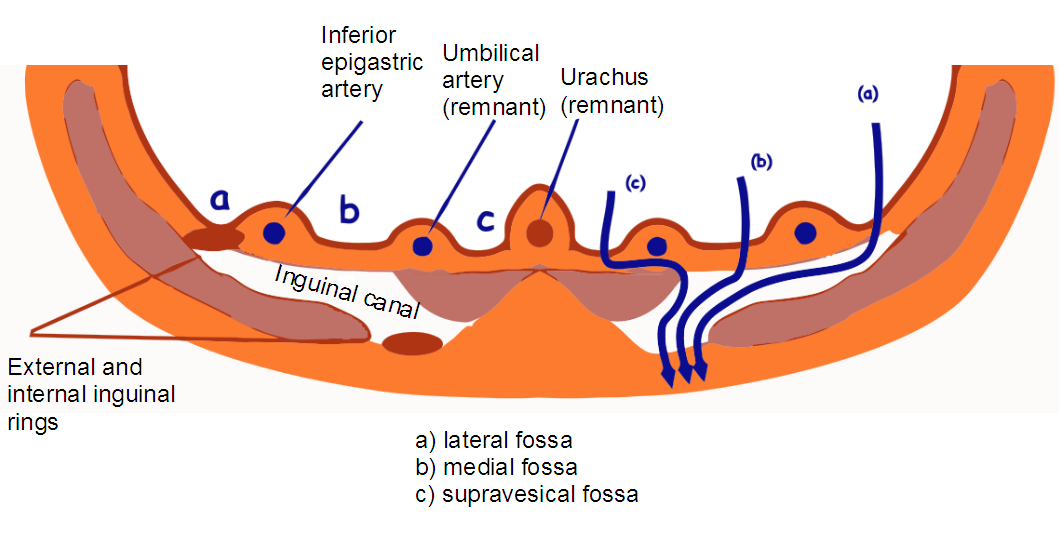
- Inguinal fossae

Details

Identifiers
- Latin: fossa inguinalis lateralis
- TA98: A10.1.02.435
- TA2: 3797
- FMA: 21023

The lateral inguinal fossa is a structure described in human anatomy. It is a shallow concave stretch of peritoneum on the deep surface of the anterior abdominal wall and is best seen from the greater peritoneal cavity, looking anteriorly (as, for example, during laparoscopy).

== Boundaries ==
It is a shallow depression on the inner aspect of the abdominal wall lateral to the lateral umbilical fold.

== Clinical significance ==
It is a site of herniation for indirect inguinal hernia.

== See also ==
- Medial inguinal fossa
