= GSX2 =

Identifiers
- Aliases: GSX2, GSH2, GS homeobox 2, DMJDS2
- External IDs: OMIM: 616253; MGI: 95843; GeneCards: GSX2

Gene location (Human)
Chr.	Chromosome 4 (human)
Band	4q12	Start	54,099,523 bp
Band	4q12	End	54,102,498 bp

Gene location (Mouse)
Chr.	Chromosome 5 (mouse)
Band	5 C3.3|5 39.55 cM	Start	75,236,262 bp
Band	5 C3.3|5 39.55 cM	End	75,238,554 bp
RNA expression pattern
Bgee	Human / Mouse (ortholog); Top expressed in: amygdala; putamen; caudate nucleus; prefrontal cortex; cingulate gyrus; anterior cingulate cortex; nucleus accumbens; C1 segment; tibial nerve; Brodmann area 9 / Top expressed in: urethra; female urethra; medial ganglionic eminence; male urethra; Rostral migratory stream; retinal pigment epithelium; superior frontal gyrus; ventricular zone; mesencephalon; thalamus; More reference expression data
BioGPS	n/a
Gene ontology
Molecular function	DNA binding; sequence-specific DNA binding; DNA-binding transcription factor activity, RNA polymerase II-specific; DNA-binding transcription factor activity
Cellular component	nucleus
Biological process	regulation of respiratory gaseous exchange by nervous system process; olfactory bulb interneuron differentiation; multicellular organism development; regulation of cell migration; telencephalon regionalization; central nervous system development; spinal cord association neuron differentiation; neuron fate commitment; regulation of transcription, DNA-templated; hindbrain morphogenesis; forebrain morphogenesis; subpallium neuron fate commitment; neuron fate specification; pattern specification process; positive regulation of oligodendrocyte differentiation; transcription, DNA-templated; positive regulation of Notch signaling pathway; forebrain dorsal/ventral pattern formation; brain development; subpallium development; regulation of transcription by RNA polymerase II
Sources:Amigo / QuickGO
Orthologs
Databases	NCBI: entry; OMA: entry
Species	Human	Mouse
Entrez	170825	14843
Ensembl	ENSG00000180613	ENSMUSG00000035946
UniProt	Q9BZM3	P31316
RefSeq (mRNA)	NM_133267	NM_133256
RefSeq (protein)	NP_573574	NP_573555
Location (UCSC)	Chr 4: 54.1 – 54.1 Mb	Chr 5: 75.24 – 75.24 Mb
PubMed search
- Wikidata
View/Edit Human	View/Edit Mouse

GS homeobox 2 (GSX2) is a protein encoded by a gene of the same name, located on chromosome 4 in humans, and on chromosome 5 in mice.

It is especially important to regulating the development of the brain, particularly during embryonic development. Mutations have been linked to a variety of neurological disorders that can cause intellectual disability, dystonia (difficulty with movement) and seizures.

== Structure ==
GSX2 is a polypeptide chain consisting of 304 amino acids, with a molecular weight of 32,031.

== Function ==
GSX2 is a homeobox transcription factor essential for mammalian forebrain development, particularly in specifying and patterning the basal ganglia. It binds specific DNA sequences, crucial for dorsal-ventral patterning of the telencephalon and specifying neural progenitors in the ventral forebrain.

GSX2 acts within a temporal framework, initially guiding the specification of striatal projection neurons during early lateral ganglionic eminence (LGE) neurogenesis, and later supporting olfactory bulb interneuron development. Mutations in GSX2 have been linked to basal ganglia dysgenesis in humans, resulting in severe neurological symptoms, including dystonia and intellectual impairment.

GSX2 is highly expressed in neural progenitors within the ganglionic eminences, precursors to the basal ganglia and olfactory structures. It promotes neurogenesis while inhibiting differentiation into oligodendrocytes, a type of glial cell in the central nervous system.

== Clinical significance ==
=== Neurodevelopmental disorders ===
Mutations in GSX2 have been linked to severe neurodevelopmental disorders characterized by specific brain malformations. This includes cases of basal ganglia agenesis, leading to symptoms such as a slowly progressive decline in neurologic function, dystonia, and intellectual impairment.

==== Diencephalic-mesencephalic junction dysplasia syndrome ====
A single nucleotide polymorphism and missense mutation in GSX2, rs1578004339, has been found to be a pathogenic cause of diencephalic-mesencephalic junction dysplasia syndrome, a neurodevelopmental disorder characterised by severe intellectual disability and seizures.
