= GSX1 =

Identifiers
- Aliases: GSX1, GSH1, Gsh-1, GS homeobox 1
- External IDs: OMIM: 616542; MGI: 95842; GeneCards: GSX1

Gene location (Human)
Chr.	Chromosome 13 (human)
Band	13q12.2	Start	27,792,483 bp
Band	13q12.2	End	27,794,768 bp

Gene location (Mouse)
Chr.	Chromosome 5 (mouse)
Band	5 G3|5 86.79 cM	Start	147,125,506 bp
Band	5 G3|5 86.79 cM	End	147,127,757 bp
RNA expression pattern
Bgee	Human / Mouse (ortholog); Top expressed in: hypothalamus; nucleus accumbens; hippocampal formation; temporal lobe; anterior cingulate cortex; hippocampus proper; prefrontal cortex; amygdala; dorsolateral prefrontal cortex; mesencephalon / Top expressed in: glomerulus; urethra; embryo; female urethra; male urethra; hair; medial ganglionic eminence; embryo; pretectal area; optic stalk; More reference expression data
BioGPS	n/a
Gene ontology
Molecular function	RNA polymerase II cis-regulatory region sequence-specific DNA binding; sequence-specific DNA binding; DNA binding; DNA-binding transcription activator activity, RNA polymerase II-specific; DNA-binding transcription factor activity, RNA polymerase II-specific
Cellular component	nucleus
Biological process	multicellular organism development; neuron fate commitment; regulation of transcription, DNA-templated; transcription by RNA polymerase II; adenohypophysis development; spinal cord association neuron differentiation; transcription, DNA-templated; positive regulation of transcription by RNA polymerase II; hypothalamus development
Sources:Amigo / QuickGO
Orthologs
Databases	NCBI: entry; OMA: entry
Species	Human	Mouse
Entrez	219409	14842
Ensembl	ENSG00000169840	ENSMUSG00000053129
UniProt	Q9H4S2	P31315
RefSeq (mRNA)	NM_145657	NM_008178
RefSeq (protein)	NP_663632	NP_032204
Location (UCSC)	Chr 13: 27.79 – 27.79 Mb	Chr 5: 147.13 – 147.13 Mb
PubMed search
- Wikidata
View/Edit Human	View/Edit Mouse

GS homeobox 1 (GSX1) is a protein encoded by the gene of the same name, located on chromosome 13 in humans and chromosome 5 in mice.

GSX1 is part of the homeobox gene family and acts as a transcription factor. It is essential for the expression of growth hormone-releasing hormone (GHRH) and is crucial for the development of neurons involved in sensory processing, particularly in prepulse inhibition.

Additionally, GSX1 is implicated in spinal cord injury recovery, promoting neural stem cell proliferation and enhancing locomotor function in injured mice.

== Structure ==
GSX1 is a polypeptide chain consisting of 264 amino acids, with a molecular weight of 27,833 Da. The GSX1 protein contains a homeodomain, a conserved protein domain that facilitates binding to double-stranded DNA, suggesting its role as a transcription factor.

=== Gene Location ===
The GSX1 gene is located on the short arm of chromosome 13 at the cytogenetic band 13q12.3. It is part of a larger family of homeobox genes, which are crucial for developmental processes and the regulation of gene expression during embryonic development.

== Function ==
GSX1 is classified as an activator and developmental protein. It plays a significant role in various biological processes, including transcription and transcription regulation. The protein features a DNA-binding domain and is predominantly localized in the cell nucleus, where it influences the expression of target genes.

=== Growth hormone-releasing hormone ===
One of the key functions of GSX1 is its involvement in the expression of the growth hormone-releasing hormone (GHRH) gene. Research indicates that GSX1, known as Gsh-1 in mice, is essential for GHRH gene expression.

A study demonstrated that the absence of Gsh-1 in knockout mice resulted in a dwarf phenotype and a complete loss of GHRH expression. This study elucidated that GSX1 binds to multiple regulatory sites in the GHRH promoter, enhancing its transcriptional activity, especially in the presence of CREB-binding protein, indicating a cooperative regulatory mechanism within the hypothalamus.

=== Prepulse inhibition in the brain ===
GSX1 plays a critical role in the development of specific neurons involved in sensory processing and cognitive regulation. Research has shown that GSX1-expressing neurons are essential for prepulse inhibition, a mechanism that helps the brain filter out irrelevant information and prevent cognitive overload. In studies using larval zebrafish and GSX1 knockout mice, the absence or silencing of these neurons resulted in significant impairments in prepulse inhibition, because they are involved in initiating startle responses.

== Applications ==
=== Spinal cord injury ===
GSX1 has been implicated in tissue regeneration strategies, particularly in the context of spinal cord injury (SCI).

Promoting resident cells, especially neural stem and progenitor cells (NSPCs), is a potential approach for treating SCI. However, adult NSPCs primarily differentiate into glial cells (a type of brain cell that's not a neuron and helps support neural structure), contributing to glial scar formation at injury sites, which isn't useful.

GSX1, in its developmental role, regulates the generation of excitatory and inhibitory interneurons during spinal cord embryonic development.

Recent studies show that lentivirus-mediated expression of GSX1 increases the number of NSPCs in a mouse model of SCI during shortly after injury. This expression subsequently boosts the generation of glutamatergic and cholinergic interneurons while decreasing the production interneurons that produce GABA in the long term.

This ultimately means that GSX1 expression reduces reactive astrogliosis and glial scar formation, enhances serotonin neuronal activity, and improves locomotor function in injured mice, leading to better long-term outcomes.
