= Medial inguinal fossa =

Anatomical region of the lower abdomen

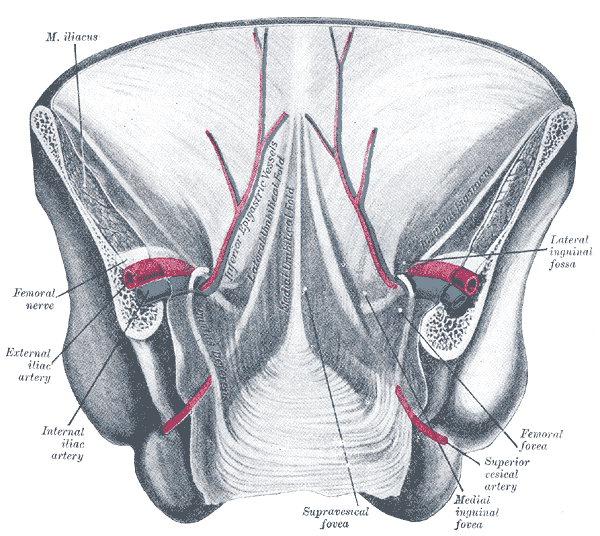
- Posterior view of the anterior abdominal wall in its lower half. The peritoneum is in place, and the various cords are shining through.

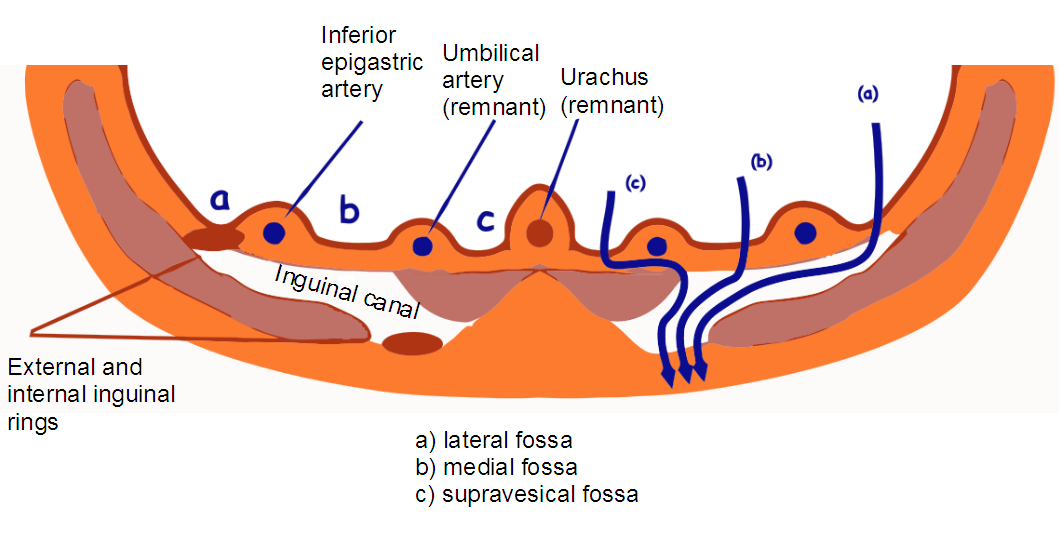
- Inguinal fossae

Details

Identifiers
- Latin: fossa inguinalis medialis
- TA98: A10.1.02.432
- TA2: 3794
- FMA: 21022

The medial inguinal fossa is a depression located within the inguinal triangle on the peritoneal surface of the anterior abdominal wall between the ridges formed by the lateral umbilical fold and the medial umbilical ligament, corresponding to the superficial inguinal ring.

== Clinical significance ==
This fossa represents a weakness in the transversalis fascia of the abdomen, and is associated with direct inguinal hernias.

== See also ==
- Lateral inguinal fossa
