= Urachal cyst =

- Specialty: Medical genetics

A urachal cyst is a sinus remaining from the allantois during embryogenesis. It is a cyst which occurs in the remnants between the umbilicus and bladder. This is a type of cyst occurring in a persistent portion of the urachus, presenting as an extraperitoneal mass in the umbilical region. It is characterized by abdominal pain, and fever if infected. It may rupture, leading to peritonitis, or it may drain through the umbilicus. Urachal cysts are usually silent clinically until infection, calculi or adenocarcinoma develop.

== Symptoms and signs ==
- Lower abdominal pain
- Pain on urination
- Persistent umbilical discharge
- Fever
- Urinary tract infection
- Lump
- Hematuria

== Diagnosis ==
Urachal cysts are rare defects found mostly in young children and hence medical ultrasound of the abdomen, bladder and pelvis is the most used diagnostic tool combined with MRI scan and CT scan in older patients who can remain still during a scan.

== See also ==
- urachus
- cyst
