= Gaotu Techedu =

Chinese educational technology company

Gaotu Techedu Inc. 高途在线有限公司
- Company type: Public
- Traded as: NYSE: GOTU
- Founded: 2014; 12 years ago in Beijing, China
- Key people: Xiang Dong Chen (Chairman and CEO)
- Revenue: ▲CN¥7.125 billion (2020)
- Operating income: ▼CN¥−1.755 billion (2020)
- Net income: ▼CN¥−1.393 billion (2020)
- Number of employees: 6435
- Website: www.gaotu.cn

Gaotu Techedu
- Simplified Chinese: 高途在线有限公司
- Traditional Chinese: 高途在線有限公司
Transcriptions
Standard Mandarin
- Hanyu Pinyin: Gāotú Zàixiàn Yǒuxiàn Gōngsī

Gaotu Techedu Inc. (Chinese: 高途在线有限公司; pinyin: Gāotú Zàixiàn Yǒuxiàn Gōngsī, formerly GSX Techedu Inc., from 跟谁学, Genshuixue) is a Chinese education technology company offering online tutoring services for K-12 students, along with foreign language and professional training courses for adults. The company was founded in 2014 by Xiang Dong Chen. Its primary product is the online education platform Genshuixue.

GSX is currently under investigation by the U.S. Securities and Exchange Commission after more than a dozen research reports came out in 2020 accusing GSX of inflating its revenue numbers. These critical reports included ones from short-selling firms such as Muddy Waters Research. The stock price went from a high of $149.05 on January 27, 2021, to a low of $2.40 as of July 26, 2021.
