= Main Squeeze (disambiguation) =

Main Squeeze is a 1976 jazz album by Chuck Mangione, as well as its titular song.

(The) Main Squeeze may also refer, in music, to:

- The Main Squeeze, Indiana funk band
- The Main Squeeze (album) by Jimmy McGriff in 1974
- "Main Squeeze", 2005 reggae song by Lloyd Brown on Jet Star

== See also ==
- "Mane Squeeze" on the hiphop album Keak Hendrix
