= Urachal fistula =

- Specialty: Urology

A urachal fistula is a congenital disorder caused by the persistence of the allantois (later, urachus), the structure that connects an embryo's bladder to the yolk sac. Normally, the urachus closes off to become the median umbilical ligament; however, if it remains open, urine can drain from the bladder to an opening by the umbilicus.

This condition is a rare defect, mostly found in children, and is also known as an open or patent urachus.
