= Homeobox protein CDX-4 =

Protein-coding gene in humans

CDX4

Identifiers
- Aliases: CDX4, caudal type homeobox 4
- External IDs: OMIM: 300025; MGI: 88362; GeneCards: CDX4

Gene location (Human)
Chr.	X chromosome (human)
Band	Xq13.2	Start	73,447,053 bp
Band	Xq13.2	End	73,455,171 bp

Gene location (Mouse)
Chr.	X chromosome (mouse)
Band	X D|X 46.06 cM	Start	102,365,004 bp
Band	X D|X 46.06 cM	End	102,374,198 bp
RNA expression pattern
Bgee	Human / Mouse (ortholog); Top expressed in: skin of abdomen; gonad; embryo; skin of limb; skin of leg; nervous system; tibial nerve / Top expressed in: tail of embryo; embryo; urethra; male urethra; primitive streak; embryo; blastocyst; allantois; right kidney; proximal tubule; More reference expression data
BioGPS	n/a
Gene ontology
Molecular function	RNA polymerase II cis-regulatory region sequence-specific DNA binding; DNA binding; sequence-specific DNA binding; DNA-binding transcription activator activity, RNA polymerase II-specific; protein binding; DNA-binding transcription factor activity, RNA polymerase II-specific; RNA polymerase II transcription regulatory region sequence-specific DNA binding; DNA-binding transcription factor activity
Cellular component	nucleus
Biological process	animal organ morphogenesis; multicellular organism development; labyrinthine layer development; cell differentiation; blood vessel development; anterior/posterior axis specification; regulation of transcription, DNA-templated; negative regulation of transcription by RNA polymerase II; transcription, DNA-templated; positive regulation of transcription by RNA polymerase II; anterior/posterior pattern specification; placenta development; transcription by RNA polymerase II; regulation of transcription by RNA polymerase II
Sources:Amigo / QuickGO
Orthologs
Databases	NCBI: entry; OMA: entry
Species	Human	Mouse
Entrez	1046	12592
Ensembl	ENSG00000131264	ENSMUSG00000031326
UniProt	O14627	Q07424
RefSeq (mRNA)	NM_005193	NM_007674
RefSeq (protein)	NP_005184	NP_031700
Location (UCSC)	Chr X: 73.45 – 73.46 Mb	Chr X: 102.37 – 102.37 Mb
PubMed search
- Wikidata
View/Edit Human	View/Edit Mouse

Homeobox protein CDX-4 is a protein that in humans is encoded by the CDX4 gene. This gene is a member of the caudal-related homeobox transcription factor family that also includes CDX1 and CDX2.

== Function ==
The transcription factor encoded by the CDX4 gene participates in the formation of extra-embryonic tissues, anterior-posterior patterning and blood formation during embryogenesis. It does so through the regulation of Hox gene expression.

Before placentation takes place, CDX4 plays a role in its development. CDX4 mutants are born healthy and are fertile, however its importance is revealed in compound CDX mutants. Compound mutants carrying one CDX2 null allele and homozygous null for CDX4 fail to generate posterior tissue caudal to the hindlimbs and most of these embryos die around embryonic day 10.5 from lack of placental development. Around 10% of this phenotype may progress to full term, but then die shortly after birth. Upon inspection the morphogenesis of ano-rectal and urethral tissues was observed.

The most well described function of CDX genes are their role in caudal body formation. Transcription factors of the CDX gene family, in part control Hox gene expression by responding to signaling molecules Retinoic Acid, Wnt, and FGF. The redundant contribution of CDX4 in axial elongation is shown in that neither CDX4 null or CDX1/CDX4 compound mutants appear with impaired axial elongation. However, CDX4 does have a role in determining pancreatic B-cell number, specifying anterior-posterior location of the foregut organs including the pancreas and liver. Thus, an abnormal state is shown in embryos deficient in CDX4 by posteriorly shifted pancreas, liver and small intestines.

In blood formation, CDX4 regulation of Hox genes is necessary for the specification of hematopoietic cell fate during embryogenesis. This is demonstrated by the fact that blood deficiencies in CDX4 mutants can be rescued by the over expression of certain Hox genes.

Knockout models have been generated in mice as described in CDX4’s role in caudal body formation.
