= Median umbilical ligament =

Structure in human anatomy

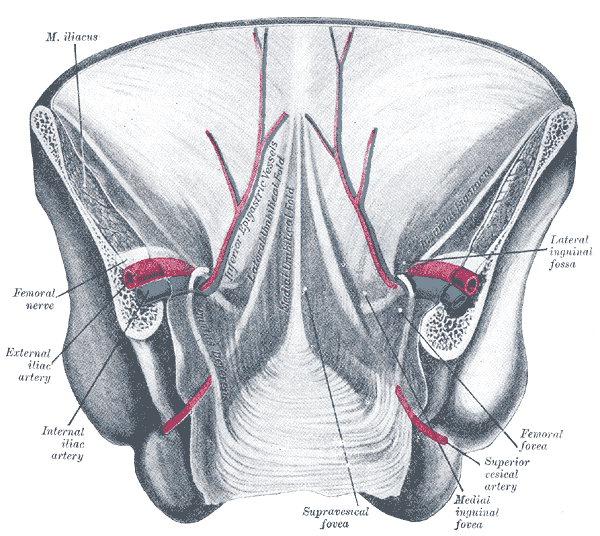
- Posterior view of the anterior abdominal wall in its lower half. The peritoneum is in place, and the various cords are shining through. Median umbilical ligament is not labeled, but it is located just underneath the median umbilical fold, seen in the center of the diagram

Details
- From: Apex of urinary bladder
- To: Umbilicus

Identifiers
- Latin: ligamentum umbilicale medianum, ligamentum suspensorium vesicae urinariae
- TA98: A08.3.01.007
- FMA: 16568

In human anatomy, the median umbilical ligament is an unpaired midline ligamentous structure upon the lower inner surface of the anterior abdominal wall. It is covered by the median umbilical fold.

The median umbilical ligament represents the remnant of the fetal urachus. It extends from the apex of the bladder to the umbilicus, on the deep surface of the anterior abdominal wall.

The median umbilical ligament represents one of the five ligaments of the internal anterior abdominal wall inferior to the umbilicus; laterally on either side of it are one medial umbilical ligament and finally one lateral umbilical ligament.

== Development ==
The median umbilical ligament begins as the allantois in the embryonic period. It then becomes the urachus in the fetus. This later develops into the median umbilical ligament at birth. It is also formed from the cloaca in utero.

== Function ==
The median umbilical ligament has no known function.

== Clinical significance ==
The median umbilical ligament may be used as a landmark for surgeons who are performing laparoscopy, such as laparoscopic inguinal hernia repair. Other than this, it has no function in a born human and may be cut or removed with impunity.

It contains the urachus, which is the obliterated form of the allantois. The allantois forms a communication between the cloaca (terminal part of hindgut) and the amniotic sac during embryonic development. If the urachus fails to close during fetal life, it can result in anatomical abnormalities such as a urachal cyst, urachal fistula, urachal diverticulum or urachal sinus.

In very rare cases the urachus can fail to close fully. This can lead to a condition known as a patent urachus (also urachal fistula). Although it is mainly immediately diagnosed after birth it can occur at any stages of life. In this condition there is a functional tubular connection between the umbilicus and the bladder which can lead to urine draining through the umbilicus. Patients often present with umbilical wetness or recurring infections in the area. Treatment options include laparoscopic surgery, excision of the umbilicus or conservative therapy. Due to limited risks conservative therapy, while still being chosen rarely, has been gaining some traction in the last years.

== Society and culture ==
The median umbilical ligament was jokingly referred to as "Xander's ligament" in a YouTube video published by Dr. Alexander R. Toftness (aka. ARTexplains on YouTube), and this name was subsequently used on Wikipedia for a short time. This term was later used in a paper published in Mayo Clinic Proceedings. The term has also appeared in a medical textbook of obstetrics and gynaecology.
