= Lateral umbilical fold =

Lateral umbilical ligament
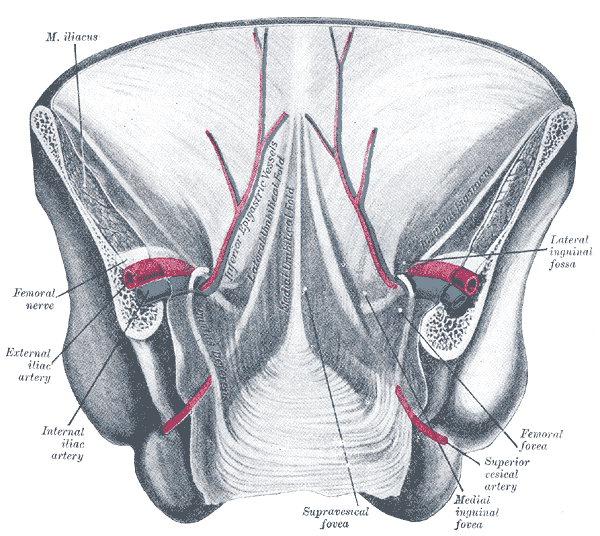
- Posterior view of the anterior abdominal wall in its lower half. The peritoneum is in place, and the various cords are shining through.

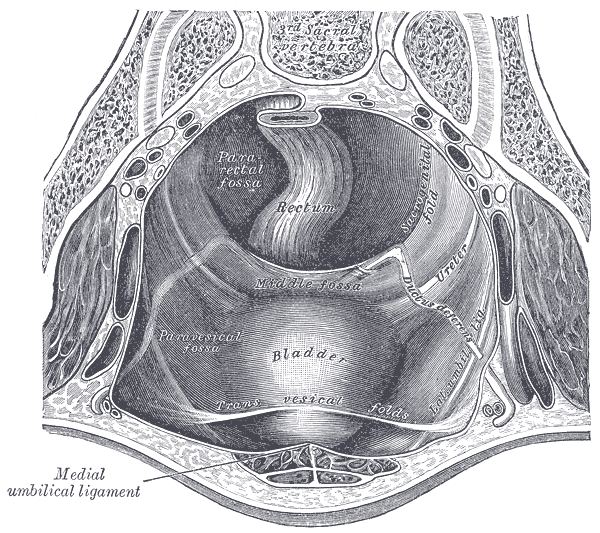
- The peritoneum of the male pelvis.

Details

Identifiers
- Latin: plica umbilicalis lateralis; plica epigastrica
- TA98: A10.1.02.434
- TA2: 3796
- FMA: 16537

The lateral umbilical fold is an elevation (on either side of the body) of the peritoneum lining the inner/posterior surface of the lower anterior abdominal wall formed by the underlying inferior epigastric artery and inferior epigastric vein which the peritoneum covers. Superiorly, the lateral umbilical fold ends where the vessels reach and enter the rectus sheath at the arcuate line of rectus sheath; in spite of the name, the lateral umbilical folds do not extend as far superiorly as the umbilicus. Inferiorly, it extends to just medial to the deep inguinal ring.

Each lateral umbilical fold is situated lateral to the ipsilateral medial umbilical fold. Unlike the median and medial umbilical folds, the contents of the lateral umbilical fold remain functional after birth.

== Clinical significance ==
The lateral umbilical fold is an important reference site with regards to hernia classification. A direct hernia occurs medial to the lateral umbilical fold, whereas an indirect hernia originates lateral to the fold. This latter case is due to the placement of the opening of the deep inguinal ring in the space lateral to the lateral umbilical fold, which allows the passage of the ductus deferens, testicular artery, and other components of the spermatic cord in men, or the round ligament of the uterus in women.

== Additional images ==
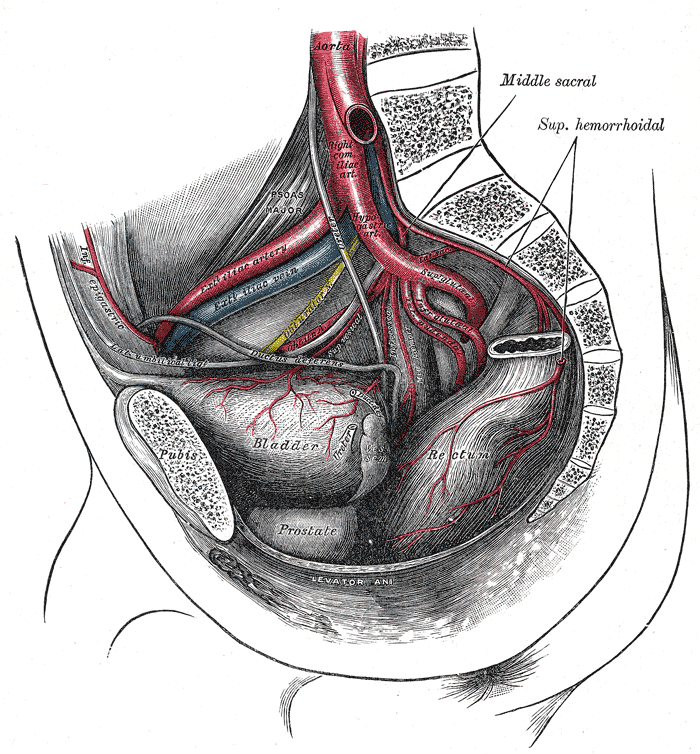
The arteries of the pelvis.

== See also ==
- Median umbilical ligament
- Medial umbilical ligament
