= Homeobox protein CDX-1 =

Protein-coding gene in the species Homo sapiens

CDX1

Identifiers
- Aliases: CDX1, caudal type homeobox 1, Homeobox protein CDX-1
- External IDs: OMIM: 600746; MGI: 88360; GeneCards: CDX1

Gene location (Human)
Chr.	Chromosome 5 (human)
Band	5q32	Start	150,166,778 bp
Band	5q32	End	150,184,558 bp

Gene location (Mouse)
Chr.	Chromosome 18 (mouse)
Band	18 E1|18 34.41 cM	Start	61,151,934 bp
Band	18 E1|18 34.41 cM	End	61,169,271 bp
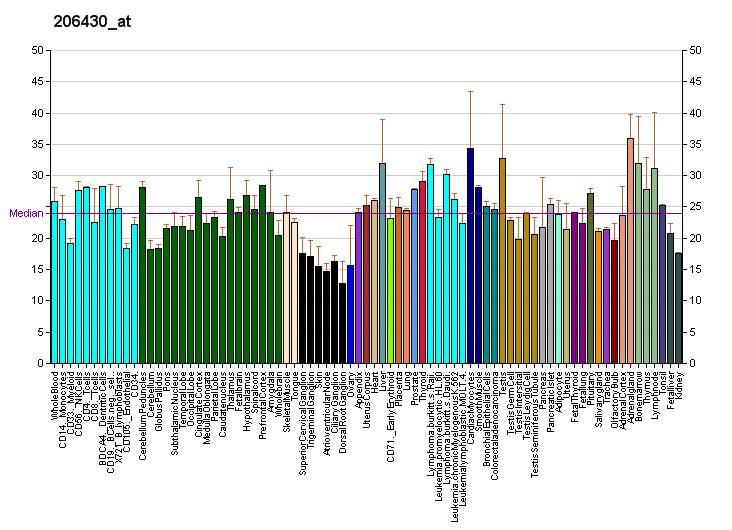
RNA expression pattern
Bgee	Human / Mouse (ortholog); Top expressed in: mucosa of transverse colon; rectum; mucosa of ileum; mucosa of sigmoid colon; duodenum; gonad; jejunal mucosa; testicle; epithelium of colon; appendix / Top expressed in: left colon; crypt of lieberkuhn of small intestine; ileum; primitive streak; Ileal epithelium; duodenum; Paneth cell; jejunum; embryo; migratory enteric neural crest cell; More reference expression data
BioGPS	More reference expression data
Gene ontology
Molecular function	DNA-binding transcription factor activity; RNA polymerase II cis-regulatory region sequence-specific DNA binding; DNA binding; sequence-specific DNA binding; DNA-binding transcription activator activity, RNA polymerase II-specific; protein binding; DNA-binding transcription factor activity, RNA polymerase II-specific; methyl-CpG binding; RNA polymerase II transcription regulatory region sequence-specific DNA binding
Cellular component	nucleus
Biological process	animal organ morphogenesis; multicellular organism development; pattern specification process; bone morphogenesis; cell differentiation; anterior/posterior axis specification; regulation of transcription, DNA-templated; regulation of somitogenesis; positive regulation of transcription by RNA polymerase II; anterior/posterior pattern specification; transcription by RNA polymerase II; transcription, DNA-templated; regulation of transcription by RNA polymerase II
Sources:Amigo / QuickGO
Orthologs
Databases	NCBI: entry; OMA: entry
Species	Human	Mouse
Entrez	1044	12590
Ensembl	ENSG00000113722	ENSMUSG00000024619
UniProt	P47902	P18111
RefSeq (mRNA)	NM_001804	NM_009880
RefSeq (protein)	NP_001795	NP_034010
Location (UCSC)	Chr 5: 150.17 – 150.18 Mb	Chr 18: 61.15 – 61.17 Mb
PubMed search
- Wikidata
View/Edit Human	View/Edit Mouse

Homeobox protein CDX-1 is a protein in humans that is encoded by the CDX1 gene. CDX-1 is expressed in the developing endoderm and its expression persists in the intestine throughout adulthood. CDX-1 protein expression varies along the intestine, with high expression in intestinal crypts and diminishing expression along intestinal villi.

== Function ==
This gene is a member of the caudal-related homeobox transcription factor family. The encoded DNA-binding protein regulates intestine-specific gene expression and enterocyte differentiation. It has been shown to induce expression of the intestinal alkaline phosphatase gene, and inhibit beta-catenin/T-cell factor transcriptional activity.

CDX1 has also been shown to play an important role in embryonic epicardial development. It has been demonstrated that CDX proteins suppress cardiac differentiation in both zebrafish and mouse embryonic stem cells, but the overall mechanism for how this happens is poorly understood. However, CDX1 has been shown to be transiently expressed in the embryonic heart 11.5 days post coitum (dpc). This transient expression is thought to induce epicardial epithelial-to-mesenchymal transition and thus proper cardiovascular formation. It has been shown that low-dose CDX1 induction caused enhanced migration and differentiation of epicardium-derived cells into vascular smooth muscle, where as continued high dose induction of CDX1 or CDX1 deficiency diminished the ability of these cells to migrate and differentiate into smooth muscle by the actions of TGF-β1. Furthermore, CDX1 induction also altered transcript expression of genes related to cell adhesions for EMT and angiogenesis. Therefore, along with its known roles in intestinal patterning and differentiation, CDX1 is also shown to be important in epicardial development.
