= Urachus =

Structure of the urinary system

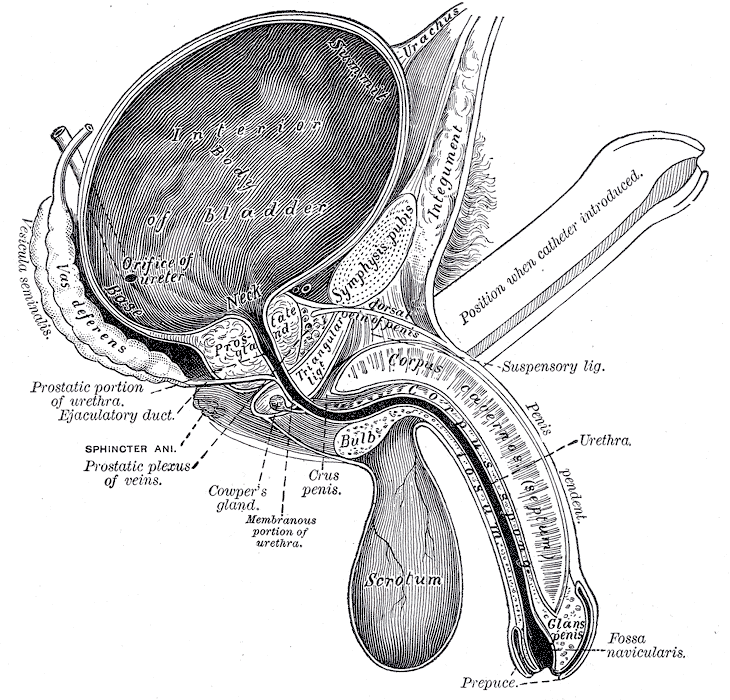
- Vertical section of bladder, penis, and urethra. Urachus is seen at top

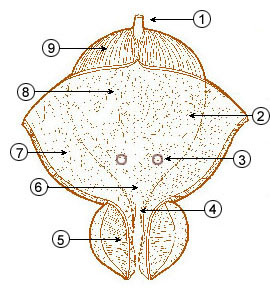
- Urachus is #1

Identifiers
- MeSH: D014497

The urachus forms from the distal end of the allantois in the embryo, and develops into a closed cord between the base of the bladder, and the navel. It drains the bladder of the fetus that joins and runs within the umbilical cord. The fibrous remnant lies in the space of Retzius, between the transverse fascia anteriorly and the peritoneum posteriorly. At birth, the urachus develops into the median umbilical ligament.

== Development ==
The part of the urogenital sinus related to the bladder and urethra absorbs the ends of the Wolffian ducts and the associated ends of the renal diverticula. This gives rise to the trigone of the bladder and part of the prostatic urethra.

The remainder of this part of the urogenital sinus forms the body of the bladder and part of the prostatic urethra. The apex of the bladder stretches and is connected to the umbilicus as a narrow canal. This canal is initially open, but later closes as the urachus goes on to definitively form the median umbilical ligament.

== Clinical significance ==
Failure of the inside of the urachus to be filled in leaves the urachus open. The telltale sign is leakage of urine through the umbilicus. This is often managed surgically. There are four anatomical causes:

1. Urachal cyst: there is no longer a connection between the bladder and the umbilicus, however a fluid filled cavity with uroepithelium lining persists between these two structures.
2. Urachal fistula: there is free communication between the bladder and umbilicus
3. Urachal diverticulum (vesicourachal diverticulum): the bladder exhibits outpouching
4. Urachal sinus: the pouch opens toward the umbilicus

The urachus is also subject to neoplasia. Urachal adenocarcinoma is histologically similar to adenocarcinoma of the bowel. Rarely, urachus carcinomas can metastasise to other regions of the body, including pelvic bones and the lung.

One urachal mass has been reported that was found to be a manifestation of IgG4-related disease.

== Additional images ==
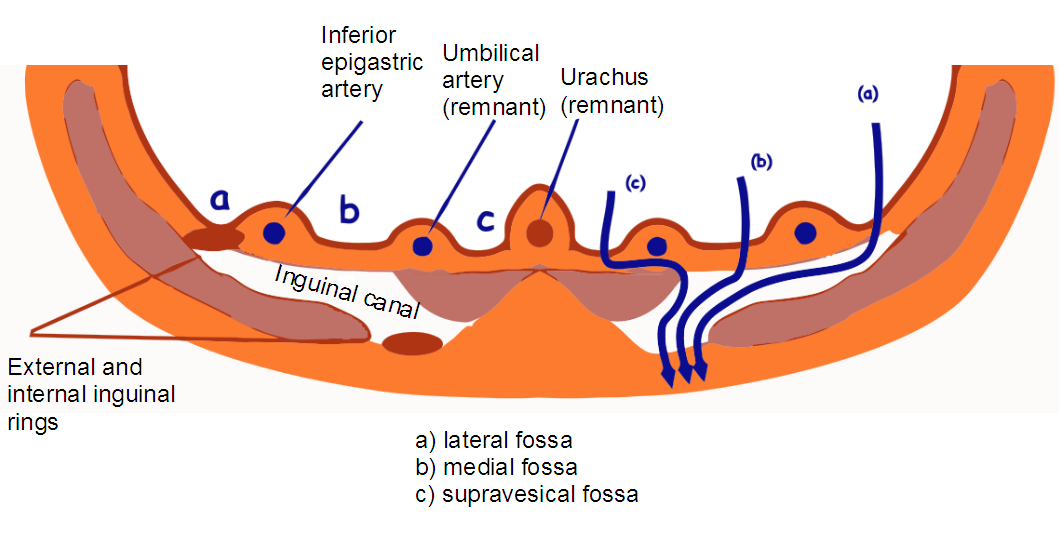
Inguinal fossae

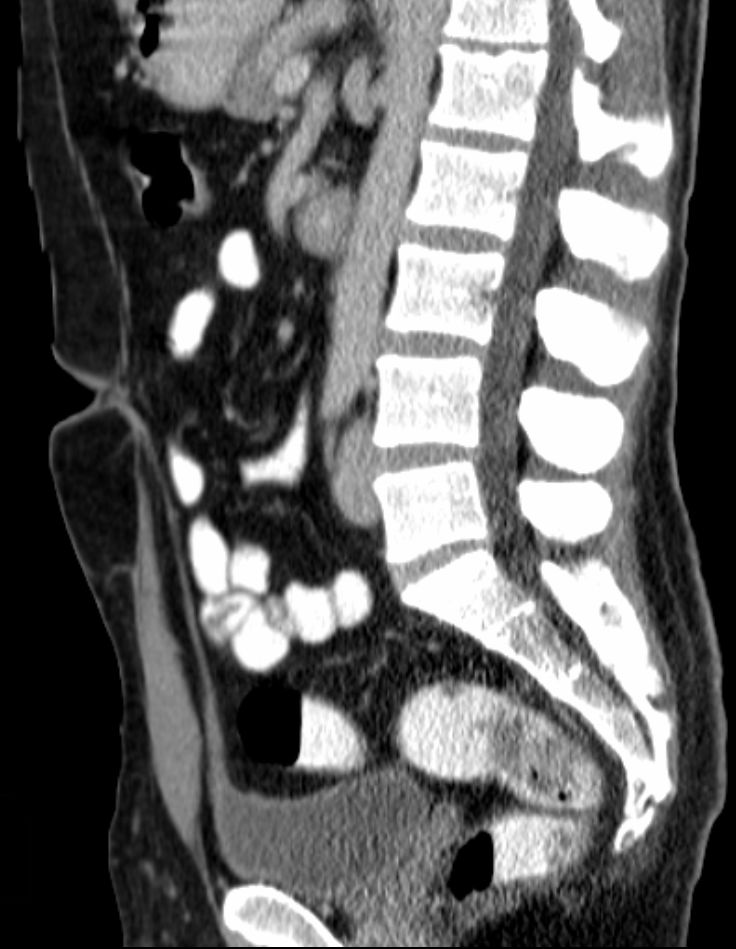
Midsagittal CT scan of a man's abdomen showing the urachus

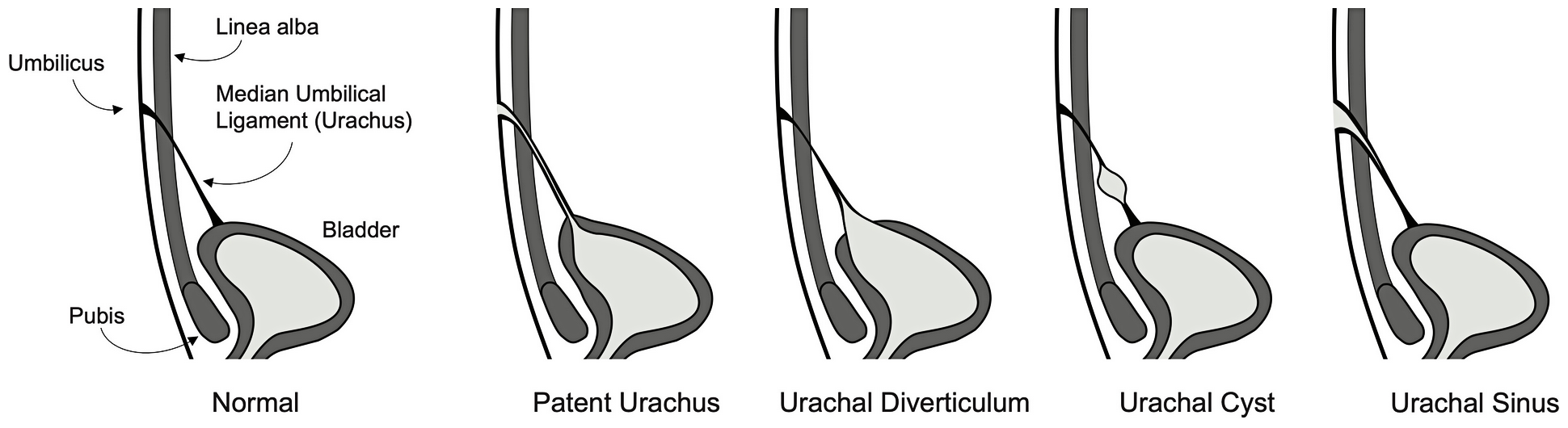
The normal urachus and its anomalous variants

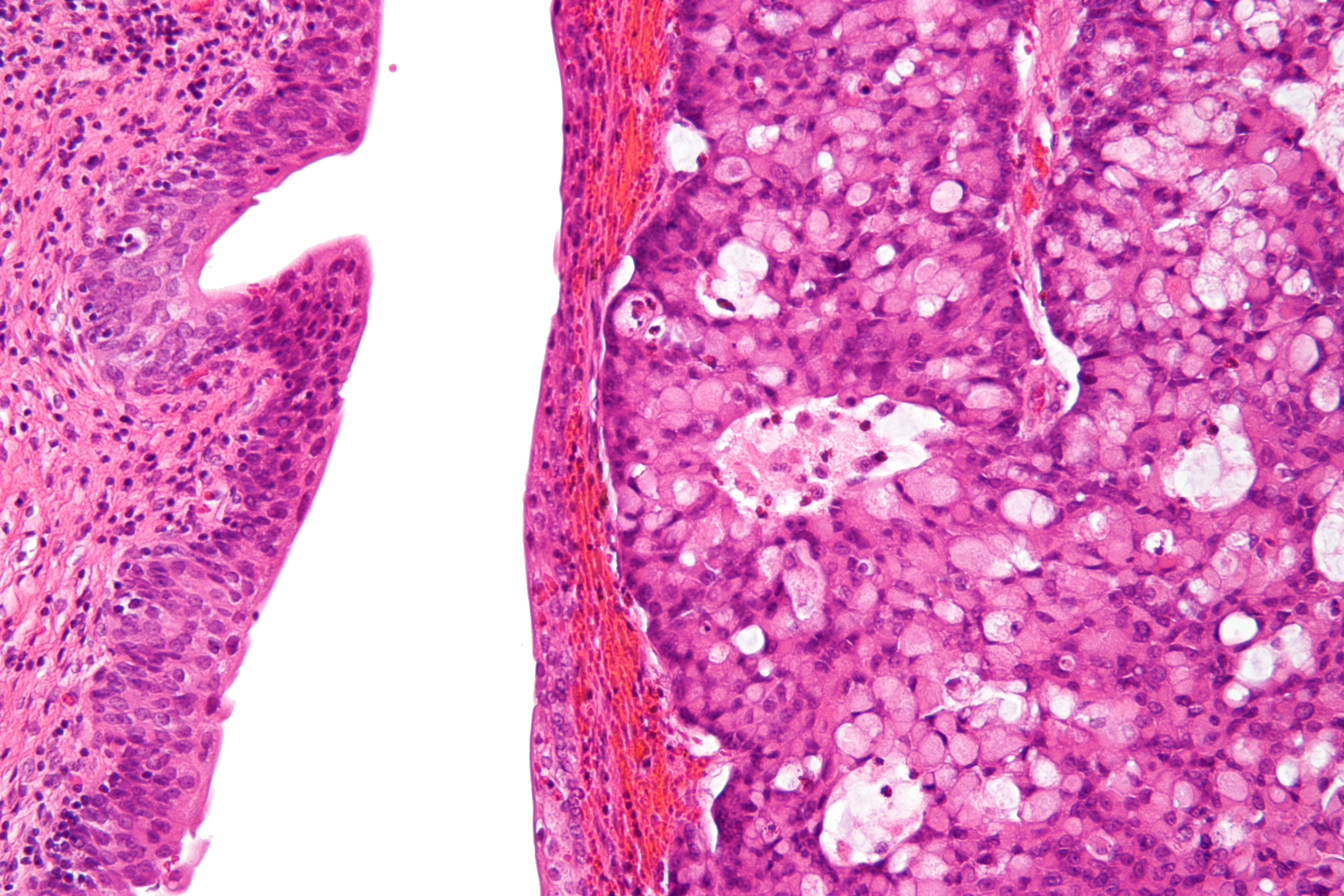
High magnification micrograph of a urachal carcinoma. H&E stain
