= List of types of inflammation by location =

This is a list of types of inflammation in the body when organised by location.

== Nervous system ==
=== CNS ===
- Encephalitis/Cerebritis
- Myelitis
- Meningitis
- Cerebellitis
- Ventriculitis

=== PNS ===
- Neuritis

=== Eye ===
- Dacryoadenitis
- Dacryocystitis
- Conjunctivitis
- Scleritis
- Episcleritis
- Uveitis
- Blepharitis
- Keratitis
- Retinitis/Chorioretinitis

=== Ear ===
- Otitis
  - Labyrinthitis
  - Otitis media
  - Otitis Externa

== Cardiovascular system ==
- Carditis
  - Endocarditis
  - Myocarditis
  - Pericarditis
- Vasculitis
  - Arteritis
  - Phlebitis
  - Capillaritis
- Aortitis

== Respiratory system ==
- Sinusitis
- Rhinitis
- Pharyngitis
- Epiglottitis
- Laryngitis
- Tracheitis
- Bronchitis
- Bronchiolitis
- Pneumonitis
  - Pneumonia
- Pleurisy

== Digestive system ==
- Stomatitis
- Cheilitis
- Glossitis
- Tonsillitis
- Sialadenitis
  - Parotitis
- Gingivitis
- Pulpitis
- Pericoronitis
- Gnathitis
- Oesophagitis
- Gastritis
- Gastroenteritis
- Enteritis
  - Duodenitis
  - Jejunitis
  - Ileitis
- Colitis
  - Pancolitis
- Appendicitis
- Cryptitis
- Proctitis
- Diverticulitis
- Hepatitis
  - Viral hepatitis
  - Alcoholic hepatitis
  - Autoimmune hepatitis
- Cholecystitis
- Cholangitis
- Pancreatitis
- Peritonitis
- Mediastinitis

== Integumentary system ==
- Dermatitis
- Cellulitis
  - Erysipelas
- Mastitis
- Onychia
- Folliculitis
- Omphalitis

== Musculoskeletal system ==
- Arthritis
  - Sacroilitis
- Myositis
- Osteitis/Osteomyelitis
  - Spondylitis
- Chondritis
- Synovitis
- Tendinitis
- Tenosynovitis
- Bursitis
- Perichondritis
- Fasciitis
- Enthesitis
- Discitis
- Dactylitis

== Urinary system ==
- Nephritis
  - Pyelonephritis
  - Interstitial Nephritis
  - Glomerulonephritis
- Ureteritis
- Cystitis
- Urethritis

== Reproductive system ==
=== Female ===
- Oophoritis
- Salpingitis
- Metritis
  - Endometritis
  - Myometritis
  - Parametritis
- Cervicitis
- Vaginitis
- Vulvitis
- Bartholinitis
- Skenitis
- Placentitis
  - Villitis
  - Intervillitis
- Funisitis
- Chorioamnionitis

=== Male ===
- Orchitis
- Epididymitis
- Vasitis/Deferentitis
- Prostatitis
- Vesiculitis
- Cowperitis
- Balanitis
- Posthitis

== Endocrine system ==
- Insulitis
- Hypophysitis
- Thyroiditis
- Parathyroiditis
- Adrenalitis
- Steatitis

== Lymphatic/immune system ==
- Lymphangitis
- Lymphadenitis
- Splenitis
- Thymitis
