= List of inflammatory disorders =

This is an incomplete list, which may never be able to satisfy certain standards for completion.

There are many causes of inflammation. Inflammation can affect any System of the human body.

== Nervous system ==
- CNS
  - Encephalitis
  - Myelitis
- Meningitis
  - Arachnoiditis
- PNS
  - Neuritis
- eye
  - Dacryoadenitis
  - Scleritis
  - Episcleritis
  - Keratitis
  - Retinitis
  - Chorioretinitis
  - Blepharitis
  - Conjunctivitis
  - Uveitis
- ear
  - Otitis externa
  - Otitis media
  - Labyrinthitis
  - Mastoiditis

== Cardiovascular system ==
- Carditis
  - Endocarditis
  - Myocarditis
  - Pericarditis
- Vasculitis
  - Arteritis
  - Phlebitis
  - Capillaritis

== Respiratory system ==
- upper
  - Sinusitis
  - Rhinitis
  - Pharyngitis
  - Laryngitis
- lower
  - Tracheitis
  - Bronchitis
  - Bronchiolitis
  - Pneumonitis
  - Pleuritis
- Mediastinitis

== Digestion system ==
=== Mouth ===
- Stomatitis
- Gingivitis
- Gingivostomatitis
- Glossitis
- Tonsillitis
- Sialadenitis/Parotitis
- Cheilitis
- Pulpitis
- Gnathitis

=== Gastrointestinal tract ===
- Esophagitis
- Gastritis
- Gastroenteritis
- Enteritis
- Colitis
- Enterocolitis
- Duodenitis
- Ileitis
- Caecitis
- Appendicitis
- Proctitis

=== Accessory digestive organs ===
- Hepatitis
- Ascending cholangitis
- Cholecystitis
- Pancreatitis
- Peritonitis

== Integumentary system ==
- Dermatitis
  - Folliculitis
- Cellulitis
- Hidradenitis

== Musculoskeletal system ==
- Arthritis
- Dermatomyositis
- soft tissue
  - Myositis
  - Synovitis/Tenosynovitis
  - Bursitis
  - Enthesitis
  - Fasciitis
  - Capsulitis
  - Epicondylitis
  - Tendinitis
  - Panniculitis
- Osteochondritis: Osteitis/Osteomyelitis
  - Spondylitis
  - Periostitis
- Chondritis

== Urinary system ==
- Nephritis
  - Glomerulonephritis
  - Pyelonephritis
- Ureteritis
- Cystitis
- Urethritis

== Reproductive system ==
=== Female ===
- Oophoritis
- Salpingitis
- Endometritis
- Parametritis
- Cervicitis
- Vaginitis
- Vulvitis
- Mastitis

=== Male ===
- Orchitis
- Epididymitis
- Prostatitis
- Seminal vesiculitis
- Balanitis
- Posthitis
- Balanoposthitis

=== Pregnancy/newborn ===
- Chorioamnionitis
- Funisitis
- Omphalitis

== Endocrine system ==
- Insulitis
- Hypophysitis
- Thyroiditis
- Parathyroiditis
- Adrenalitis

== Lymphatic system ==
- Lymphangitis
- Lymphadenitis
