= Placental expulsion =

Ejection of the placenta from the uterus after childbirth

Placental expulsion (also called afterbirth) occurs when the placenta comes out of the birth canal after childbirth. The time between the expulsion of the baby and the expulsion of the placenta is called the third stage of labor.

The third stage of labor can be managed actively with several standard procedures, or it can be managed expectantly, with physiological management or passive management. The latter allows for the placenta to be expelled without medical assistance.

Although uncommon in some countries, the placenta is sometimes kept and consumed by the mother over the weeks following the birth. This practice is termed human placentophagy and can be harmful.

== Physiology ==
=== Hormone induction of placental separation ===
As the fetal hypothalamus matures, the activation of the hypothalamic–pituitary–adrenal (HPA) axis initiates labor through two hormonal mechanisms. The end pathway of both mechanisms lead to contractions in the myometrium, a mechanical cause of placental separation, which is due to the sheer force and contractile and involutive changes that occur within the uterus, distorting the placentome.

==== Fetal adrenocorticotropic hormone (ACTH) ====
ACTH increases fetal cortisol which acts by two mechanisms:

- Increases prostaglandin F_{2α}, which abolishes the progesterone block, lowers the oxytocin receptor threshold, and increases expression of relaxin, stretching the pelvic ligaments
- Increases expression of PTGS in the fetal trophoblasts

PTGS in turn produces prostaglandin E2 which is a catalyst for pregnenolone to C-19 steroids, such as estrogen. Estrogen increases:

- Vaginal lubrication
- Softening of collagen fibre structures in the cervix, vaginal, and associated tissues
- Increases contraction associated proteins (i.e., connexins)
- Placental shedding by physiological inflammation (note that pathological inflammation often leads to retention of membranes, i.e., placentitis)

==== Fetal oxytocin ====
As the HPA axis activates, the posterior pituitary of the fetus begins to increase production of oxytocin, which stimulates the maternal myometrium to contract.

=== Cellular changes of placental separation ===
In the seventh month of pregnancy, the MHC-I complexes increase in the interplacentomal arcade reduces the bi- and tri-nucleate cells, a source of immune suppression in pregnancy. By the ninth month, the endometrial lining has thinned (due to loss of trophoblast giant cells) which exposes the endometrium directly to the fetal trophoblast epithelium. With this exposure and the increase in maternal MHC-I, T-helper 1 (Th1) cells, and macrophages induce apoptosis of trophoblast cells and endometrial epithelial cells, facilitating placental release. Th1 cells attract an influx of phagocytic leukocytes into the placentome at separation, allowing further degradation of the extracellular matrix.

=== Vascular changes of placental separation ===
After delivery, loss of fetal blood return to the placenta allows for shrinkage and collapse of the cotyledonary villi with subsequent fetal membrane separation.

== Active management ==
Methods of active management include umbilical cord clamping, stimulation of uterine contraction and cord traction.

=== Umbilical cord clamping ===
Active management routinely involves clamping of the umbilical cord, often within seconds or minutes of birth.

=== Uterine contraction ===
Uterine contraction assists in delivering the placenta. Uterine contraction reduces the placental surface area, often forming a temporary hematoma at their former interface. Myometrial contractions can be induced with medication, usually oxytocin via intramuscular injection. The use of ergometrine, on the other hand, is associated with nausea or vomiting and hypertension.

Breastfeeding soon after birth stimulates oxytocin which increases uterine tone, and through physical mechanisms uterine massage (targeting the fundus) also causes uterine contractions.

=== Cord traction ===
Controlled cord traction (CCT) consists of pulling on the umbilical cord while applying counter pressure to help deliver the placenta. It may be uncomfortable for the mother. Its performance requires specific training. Premature cord traction can pull the placenta before it has naturally detached from the uterine wall, resulting in hemorrhage. Controlled cord traction requires the immediate clamping of the umbilical cord.

A Cochrane review came to the results that controlled cord traction does not clearly reduce severe postpartum hemorrhage (defined as blood loss >1000 mL) but overall resulted in a small reduction in postpartum hemorrhage (defined as blood loss >500 mL) and mean blood loss. It did reduce the risk of manual placenta removal. The review concluded that use of controlled cord traction should be recommended if the care provider has the skills to administer it safely.

=== Manual placenta removal ===
Manual placenta removal is the evacuation of the placenta from the uterus by hand. It is usually carried out under anesthesia or more rarely, under sedation and analgesia. A hand is inserted through the vagina and cervix into the uterine cavity and the placenta is detached from the uterine wall and then removed manually. A placenta that does not separate easily from the uterine surface indicates the presence of placenta accreta.

=== Efficacy of active management ===
A Cochrane database study suggests that blood loss and the risk of postpartum bleeding will be reduced in women offered active management of the third stage of labour. A summary of the Cochrane study came to the results that active management of the third stage of labour, consisting of controlled cord traction, early cord clamping plus drainage, and a prophylactic oxytocic agent, reduced postpartum haemorrhage by 500 or 1000 mL or greater. It also reduced later morbidities including profuse blood loss, incidences of postpartum haemoglobin becoming less than 9 g/dL, blood transfusion, need for supplemental iron postpartum and length of third stage of labour. Although active management increased adverse effects such as nausea, vomiting, and headache, women were less likely to be dissatisfied.

== Retained placenta ==
A retained placenta is a placenta that does not undergo expulsion within a normal time limit. Risks of retained placenta include hemorrhage and infection. If the placenta fails to deliver in 30 minutes in a hospital environment, manual extraction may be required if heavy ongoing bleeding occurs. Very rarely, a curettage is necessary to ensure that no remnants of the placenta remain (in conditions with very adherent placenta, placenta accreta). However, in birth centers and attended home birth environments, it is common for licensed care providers to wait for the placenta's birth up to 2 hours in some instances.

== Non-humans ==
In most mammalian species, the mother bites through the cord and consumes the placenta, primarily for the benefit of prostaglandin on the uterus after birth. This is known as placentophagy. However, it has been observed in zoology that chimpanzees apply themselves to nurturing their offspring, and keep the fetus, cord, and placenta intact until the cord dries and detaches the next day.

The placenta exists in most mammals and some reptiles. It is likely polyphyletic, having arisen separately in evolution rather than being inherited from one distant common ancestor.

Studies on pigs indicate that the duration of placenta expulsion increases significantly with increased duration of farrowing.
