= Placental artery =

A placental artery may refer to:

- A maternal spiral artery
- A fetal chorionic artery
