= Cotyledon (disambiguation) =

A cotyledon is a significant part of the embryo within the seed of a plant.

Cotyledon may also refer to:

- Cotyledon (genus), a plant genus in the family Crassulaceae
- Cotyledon (placenta), a part of the anatomy of mammals
- Saxifraga cotyledon, a species of saxifrage, a plant
