= Placenta =

Organ that connects the fetus to the uterine wall

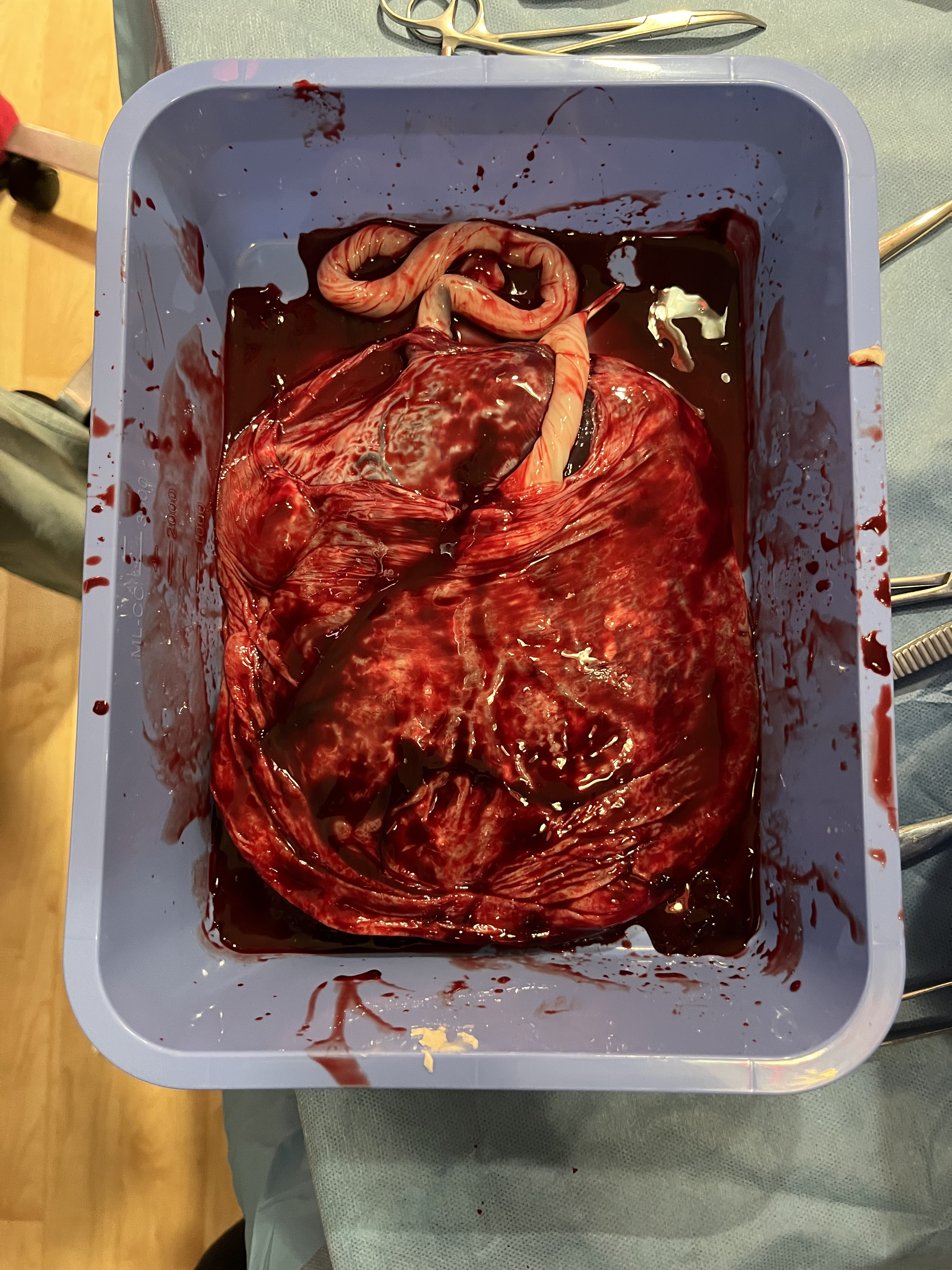
- Human placenta from just after birth with the umbilical cord in place

- Human placenta shown in uterus connected to fetus with umbilical cord

Details
- Precursor: Decidua basalis, chorion frondosum

Identifiers
- Latin: placenta
- MeSH: D010920
- TE: E5.11.3.1.1.0.5

The placenta (pl.: placentas or placentae) is a temporary embryonic and later fetal organ that begins developing from the blastocyst shortly after implantation. It plays critical roles in facilitating nutrient, gas, and waste exchange between the physically separate maternal and fetal circulations, and is an important endocrine organ, producing hormones that regulate both maternal and fetal physiology during pregnancy. The placenta connects to the fetus via the umbilical cord, and on the opposite aspect to the maternal uterus in a species-dependent manner. In humans, a thin layer of maternal decidual (endometrial) tissue comes away with the placenta when it is expelled from the uterus following birth (sometimes incorrectly referred to as the 'maternal part' of the placenta). Placentas are a defining characteristic of placental mammals, but are also found in marsupials and some non-mammals with varying levels of development.

Mammalian placentas probably first evolved about 150 million to 166 million years ago. The protein syncytin, found in the outer barrier of the placenta (the syncytiotrophoblast) between mother and fetus, has a certain RNA signature in its genome that has led to the hypothesis that it originated from an ancient retrovirus: essentially a virus that helped pave the transition from egg-laying to live birth.

The word placenta comes from the Latin word for a type of cake, from Greek πλακόεντα/πλακοῦντα plakóenta/plakoúnta, accusative of πλακόεις/πλακούς plakóeis/plakoús, "flat, slab-like", with reference to its round, flat appearance in humans. The classical plural is placentae, but the form placentas is more common in modern English.

== Evolution and phylogenetic diversity ==
The placenta has evolved independently multiple times, probably starting in fish, where it originated multiple times, including the genus Poeciliopsis. Placentation has also evolved in some reptiles.

The mammalian placenta evolved around 150 million years ago and was a critical factor in the explosive diversification of placental mammals. The placenta, as a temporary organ, has acted as a testing ground for newly acquired genes or mutations, with limited consequences. In other organs, new genes (like syncytin genes) would be strongly selected against, as any harmful phenotypes would greatly reduce the organism's fitness. However, since the placenta is already a rapidly growing, short-lived organ, new mutations can accumulate because the mother is protected from harm once she sheds the placenta after birth. Additionally, the placenta has substantially lower levels of gene regulation than other organs, allowing for “leaky” expression of viral genes that would otherwise be silenced by methylation. Once these genes are integrated into the genome and expressed in the placenta, they can accumulate mutations until, by random chance, some genes gain beneficial functions for placentation. This explains why the placenta has been a rapidly evolving organ, resulting in a vast variation of reproductive strategies in mammals. This is known as the placenta-driven evolution hypothesis. Although all mammalian placentas have the same functions, there are important differences in structure and function in different groups of mammals. For example, human, bovine, equine and canine placentas are very different at both the gross and the microscopic levels. Placentas of these species also differ in their ability to provide maternal immunoglobulins to the fetus.

== Structure ==
Placental (Eutherian) mammals, including humans, have a chorioallantoic placenta that forms from the chorion and allantois. In humans, the placenta averages 22 cm (9 inch) in length and 2–2.5 cm (0.8–1 inch) in thickness, with the center being the thickest, and the edges being the thinnest. It typically weighs approximately 500 grams (just over 1 lb). It has a dark reddish-blue or crimson color. It connects to the fetus by an umbilical cord of approximately 55–60 cm (22–24 inch) in length, which contains two umbilical arteries and one umbilical vein. The umbilical cord inserts into the chorionic plate (has an eccentric attachment). Vessels branch out over the surface of the placenta and further divide to form a network covered by a thin layer of cells. This results in the formation of villous tree structures. On the maternal side, these villous tree structures are grouped into lobules called cotyledons. In humans, the placenta usually has a disc shape, but size varies vastly between different mammalian species.

The placenta occasionally takes a form in which it comprises several distinct parts connected by blood vessels. The parts, called lobes, may number two, three, four, or more. Such placentas are described as bilobed/bilobular/bipartite, trilobed/trilobular/tripartite, and so on. If there is a clearly discernible main lobe and auxiliary lobe, the latter is called a succenturiate placenta. Sometimes the blood vessels connecting the lobes get in the way of fetal presentation during labor, which is called vasa previa.

=== Gene and protein expression ===
About 20,000 protein coding genes are expressed in human cells and 70% of these genes are expressed in the normal mature placenta. Some 350 of these genes are more specifically expressed in the placenta and fewer than 100 genes are highly placenta specific. The corresponding specific proteins are mainly expressed in trophoblasts and have functions related to pregnancy. Examples of proteins with elevated expression in placenta compared to other organs and tissues are PEG10 and the cancer testis antigen PAGE4 and expressed in cytotrophoblasts, CSH1 and KISS1 expressed in syncytiotrophoblasts, and PAPPA2 and PRG2 expressed in extravillous trophoblasts.

== Physiology ==
=== Development ===
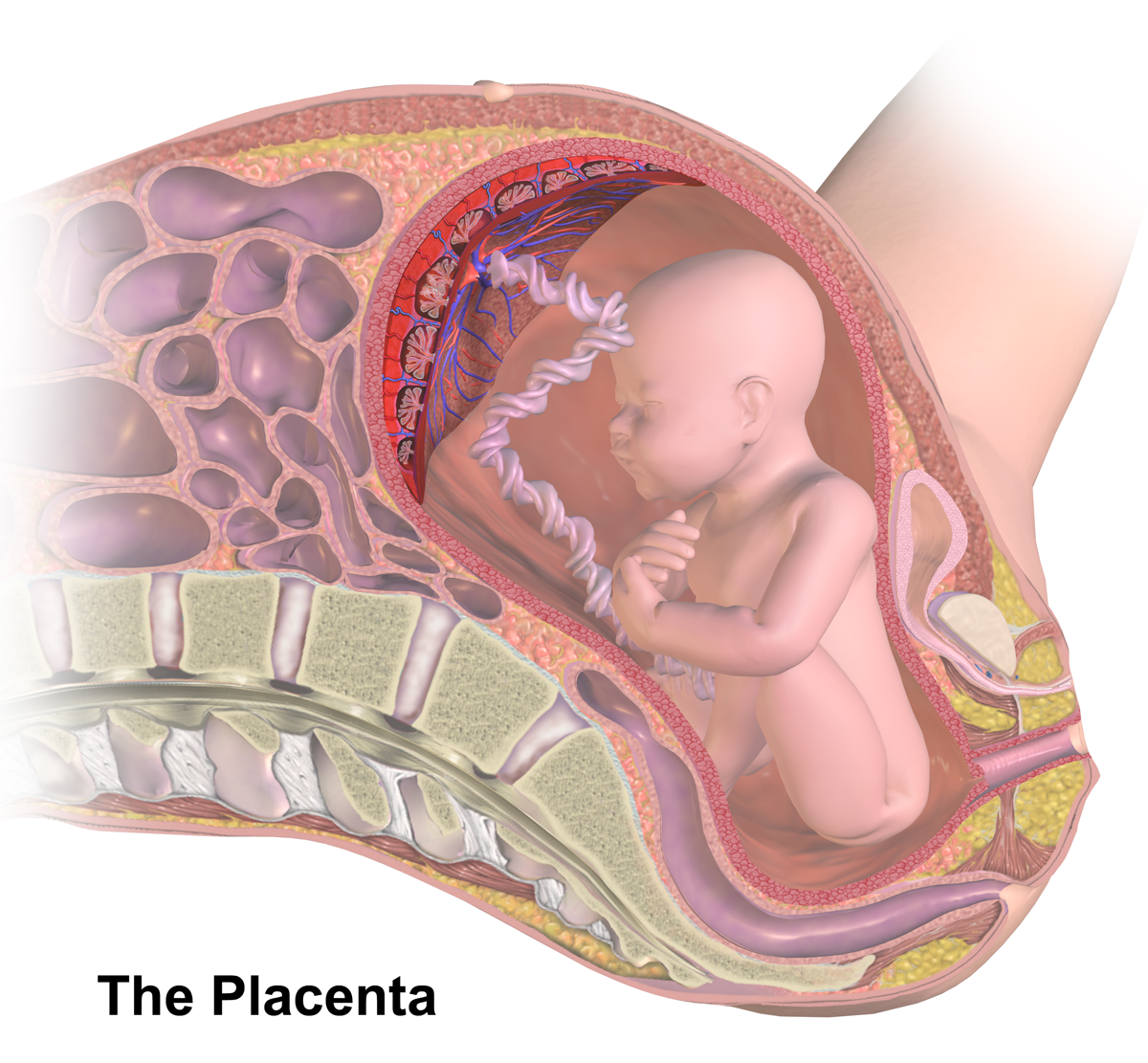
Placenta

The initial stages of human embryogenesis

The placenta begins to develop upon implantation of the blastocyst into the maternal endometrium, very early on in pregnancy at about week 4.

The outer layer of the late blastocyst, is formed of trophoblasts, cells that form the outer layer of the placenta. This outer layer is divided into two further layers: the underlying cytotrophoblast layer and the overlying syncytiotrophoblast layer. The syncytiotrophoblast is a multinucleated continuous cell layer that covers the surface of the placenta. It forms as a result of differentiation and fusion of the underlying cytotrophoblasts, a process that continues throughout placental development. The syncytiotrophoblast contributes to the barrier function of the placenta.

The placenta grows throughout pregnancy. Development of the maternal blood supply to the placenta is complete by the end of the first trimester of pregnancy week 14 (DM).

=== Placental circulation ===
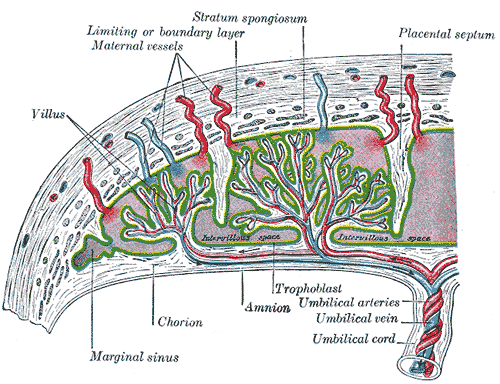
Maternal blood fills the intervillous space, nutrients, water, and gases are actively and passively exchanged, then deoxygenated blood is displaced by the next maternal pulse.

==== Maternal placental circulation ====
In preparation for implantation of the blastocyst, the endometrium undergoes decidualization. Spiral arteries in the decidua are remodeled so that they become less convoluted and their diameter is increased. The increased diameter and straighter flow path both act to increase maternal blood flow to the placenta. There is relatively high pressure as the maternal blood fills intervillous space through these spiral arteries which bathe the fetal villi in blood, allowing an exchange of gases to take place. In humans and other hemochorial placentals, the maternal blood comes into direct contact with the fetal chorion, though no fluid is exchanged. As the pressure decreases between pulses, the deoxygenated blood flows back through the endometrial veins.

Maternal blood flow begins between days 5–12, and is approximately 600–700 ml/min at term.

==== Fetoplacental circulation ====
Deoxygenated fetal blood passes through umbilical arteries to the placenta. At the junction of umbilical cord and placenta, the umbilical arteries branch radially to form chorionic arteries. Chorionic arteries, in turn, branch into cotyledon arteries. In the villi, these vessels eventually branch to form an extensive arterio-capillary-venous system, bringing the fetal blood extremely close to the maternal blood; but no intermingling of fetal and maternal blood occurs ("placental barrier").

Endothelin and prostanoids cause vasoconstriction in placental arteries, while nitric oxide causes vasodilation. On the other hand, there is no neural vascular regulation, and catecholamines have only little effect.

The fetoplacental circulation is vulnerable to persistent hypoxia or intermittent hypoxia and reoxygenation, which can lead to generation of excessive free radicals. This may contribute to pre-eclampsia and other pregnancy complications. It is proposed that melatonin plays a role as an antioxidant in the placenta.

This begins at day 17–22.

=== Birth ===
Placental expulsion begins as a physiological separation from the wall of the uterus. The period from just after the child is born until just after the placenta is expelled is called the "third stage of labor".

Placental expulsion can be managed actively, for example by giving oxytocin via intramuscular injection followed by cord traction to assist in delivering the placenta. Alternatively, it can be managed expectantly, allowing the placenta to be expelled without medical assistance. Blood loss and the risk of postpartum bleeding may be reduced in women offered active management of the third stage of labour, however there may be adverse effects and more research is necessary.

Labour is associated with an inflammatory response, which is expressed differently in the placenta depending on how a baby was delivered (e.g. via vaginal delivery, caesarean section or other) and the baby's biological sex.

Typically, the umbilical cord is cut immediately after birth. Current evidence neither supports, nor refutes, delayed cutting of the cord, according to the American Congress of Obstetricians and Gynecologists (ACOG) guidelines. For preterm infants, delayed cord cutting may be beneficial for adaptation to extrauterine life.

=== Microbiome ===
The placenta is traditionally thought to be sterile, but recent research suggests that a resident, non-pathogenic, and diverse population of microorganisms may be present in healthy tissue. However, whether these microbes exist or are clinically important is highly controversial and is the subject of active research.

== Physiology of placenta ==
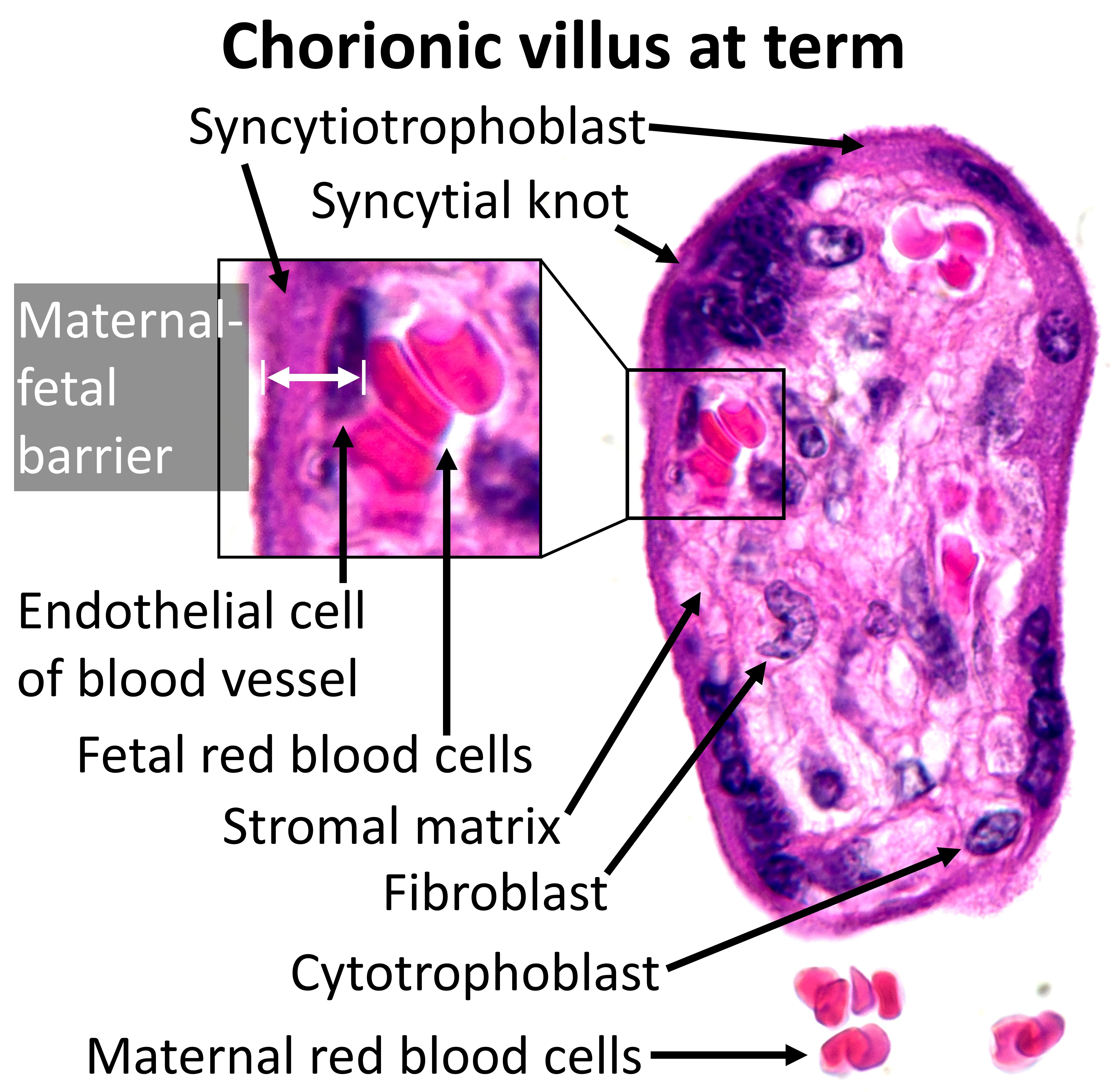
High-magnification H&E micrograph of a cross-section of a chorionic villus at term with main cell types. Insert shows the syncytiotrophoblast and endothelial cells which are the main components of the barrier that separate the fetal blood from the maternal blood that surrounds the villi.

=== Nutrition and gas exchange ===
The placenta intermediates the transfer of nutrients between mother and fetus. The perfusion of the intervillous spaces of the placenta with maternal blood allows the transfer of nutrients and oxygen from the mother to the fetus and the transfer of waste products and carbon dioxide back from the fetus to the maternal blood. Nutrient transfer to the fetus can occur via both active and passive transport. Placental nutrient metabolism was found to play a key role in limiting the transfer of some nutrients. Adverse pregnancy situations, such as those involving maternal diabetes or obesity, can increase or decrease levels of nutrient transporters in the placenta potentially resulting in overgrowth or restricted growth of the fetus.

=== Excretion ===
Waste products excreted from the fetus such as urea, uric acid, and creatinine are transferred to the maternal blood by diffusion across the placenta.

=== Immunity ===
The placenta functions as a selective barrier between maternal and fetal cells, preventing maternal blood, proteins and microbes (including bacteria and most viruses) from crossing the maternal-fetal barrier. Deterioration in placental functioning, referred to as placental insufficiency, may be related to mother-to-child transmission of some infectious diseases. A very small number of viruses including rubella virus, Zika virus and cytomegalovirus (CMV) can travel across the placental barrier, generally taking advantage of conditions at certain gestational periods as the placenta develops. CMV and Zika travel from the maternal bloodstream via placental cells to the fetal bloodstream.

Beginning as early as 13 weeks of gestation, and increasing linearly, with the largest transfer occurring in the third trimester, IgG antibodies can pass through the human placenta, providing protection to the fetus in utero. This passive immunity lingers for several months after birth, providing the newborn with a exact copy of the mother's long-term humoral immunity to see the infant through the crucial first months of extrauterine life. IgM antibodies, because of their larger size, cannot cross the placenta, one reason why infections acquired during pregnancy can be particularly hazardous for the fetus.

=== Hormonal regulation ===
- The first hormone released by the placenta is called the human chorionic gonadotropin (hCG) hormone. This is responsible for stopping the process at the end of menses when the corpus luteum ceases activity and atrophies. If hCG did not interrupt this process, it would lead to spontaneous abortion of the fetus. The corpus luteum also produces and releases progesterone and estrogen, and hCG stimulates it to increase the amount that it releases. hCG is the indicator of pregnancy that pregnancy tests look for. These tests will work when menses has not occurred or after implantation has happened on days seven to ten. hCG may also have an anti-antibody effect, protecting it from being rejected by the mother's body. hCG also assists the male fetus by stimulating the testes to produce testosterone, which is the hormone needed to allow the sex organs of the male to grow.
- Progesterone helps the embryo implant by assisting passage through the fallopian tubes. It also affects the fallopian tubes and the uterus by stimulating an increase in secretions necessary for fetal nutrition. Progesterone, like hCG, is necessary to prevent spontaneous abortion because it prevents contractions of the uterus and is necessary for implantation.
- Estrogen is a crucial hormone in the process of proliferation. This involves the enlargement of the breasts and uterus, allowing for growth of the fetus and production of milk. Estrogen is also responsible for increased blood supply towards the end of pregnancy through vasodilation. The levels of estrogen during pregnancy can increase so that they are thirty times what a non-pregnant woman mid-cycles estrogen level would be.
- Human placental lactogen (hPL) is a hormone used in pregnancy to develop fetal metabolism and general growth and development. Human placental lactogen works with growth hormone to stimulate insulin-like growth factor production and regulating intermediary metabolism. In the fetus, hPL acts on lactogenic receptors to modulate embryonic development, metabolism and stimulate production of IGF, insulin, surfactant and adrenocortical hormones. hPL values increase with multiple pregnancies, intact molar pregnancy, diabetes and Rh incompatibility. They are decreased with toxemia, choriocarcinoma, and Placental insufficiency.

=== Immunological barrier ===
The placenta and fetus may be regarded as a foreign body inside the mother and must be protected from the normal immune response of the mother that would cause it to be rejected. The placenta and fetus are thus treated as sites of immune privilege, with immune tolerance.

For this purpose, the placenta uses several mechanisms :

- It secretes neurokinin B-containing phosphocholine molecules. This is the same mechanism used by parasitic nematodes to avoid detection by the immune system of their host.
- There is presence of small lymphocytic suppressor cells in the fetus that inhibit maternal cytotoxic T cells by inhibiting the response to interleukin 2.

However, the placental barrier is not the sole means of evading the immune system, as foreign fetal cells also persist in the maternal circulation, on the other side of the placental barrier.

=== DNA methylation ===
The trophoblast is the outer layer of cells of the blastocyst (see day 9 in Figure, above, showing the initial stages of human embryogenesis). Placental trophoblast cells have a unique genome-wide DNA methylation pattern determined by de novo methyltransferases during embryogenesis. This methylation pattern is principally required to regulate placental development and function, which in turn is critical for embryo survival.

=== Other ===
The placenta also provides a reservoir of blood for the fetus, delivering blood to it in case of hypotension and vice versa, comparable to a capacitor.

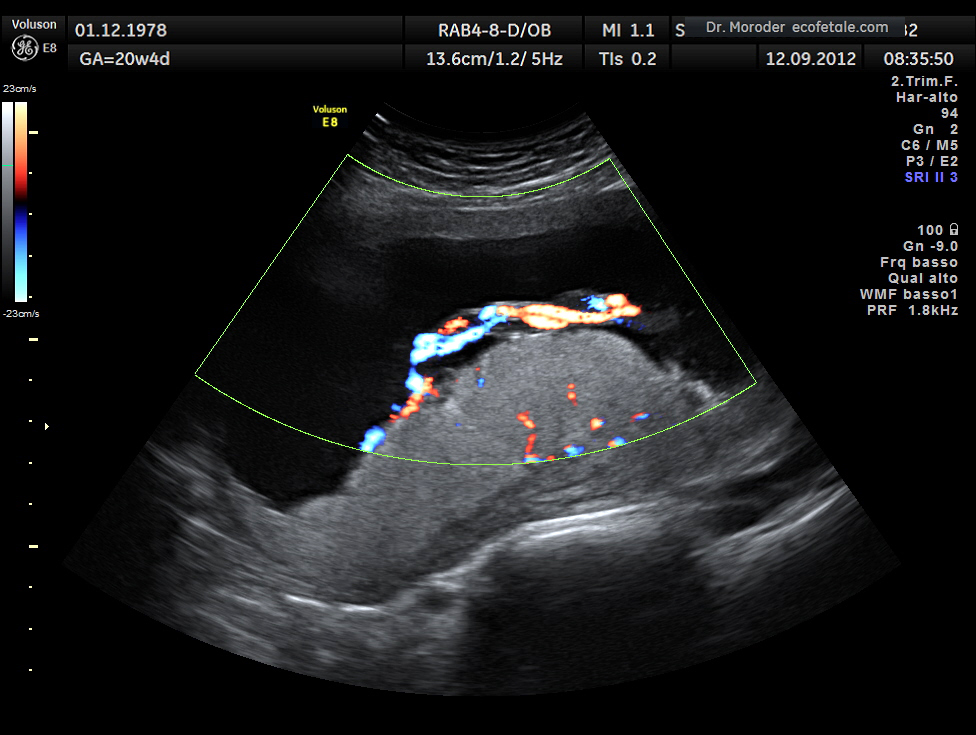
Ultrasound image of human placenta and umbilical cord (color Doppler rendering) with central cord insertion and three umbilical vessels, at 20 weeks of pregnancy

== Clinical significance ==
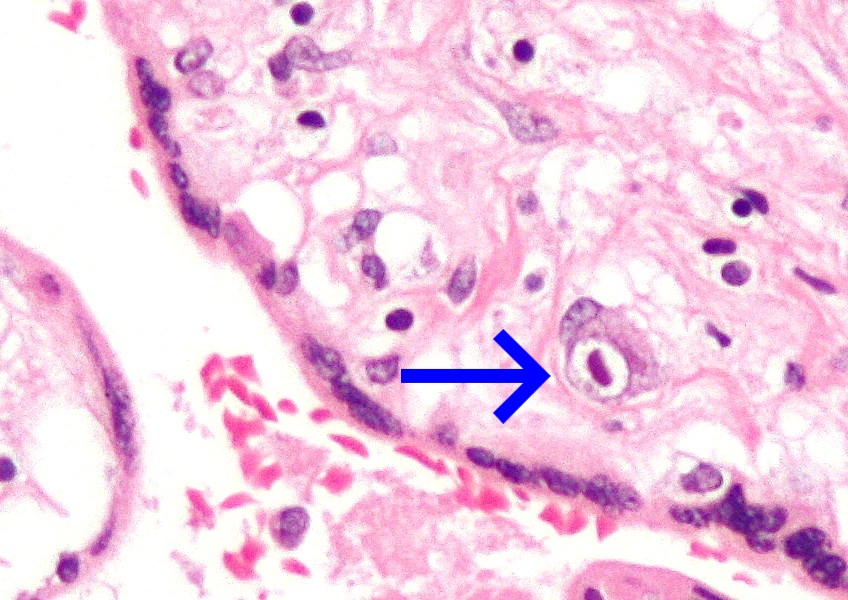
Micrograph of a cytomegalovirus (CMV) infection of the placenta (CMV placentitis). The characteristic large nucleus of a CMV-infected cell is seen off-centre at the bottom-right of the image. H&E stain.

Numerous pathologies can affect the placenta.

- Placenta accreta, when the placenta implants too deeply, all the way to the actual muscle of uterine wall (without penetrating it)
- Placenta praevia, when the placement of the placenta is too close to or blocks the cervix
- Placental abruption, premature detachment of the placenta
- Placentitis, inflammation of the placenta, such as by TORCH infections.

== Society and culture ==
The placenta often plays an important role in various cultures, with many societies conducting rituals regarding its disposal. In the Western world, the placenta is most often incinerated.

Some cultures bury the placenta for various reasons. Māori of New Zealand traditionally bury the placenta from a newborn child to emphasize the relationship between humans and the earth. Likewise, Navajo bury the placenta and umbilical cord at a specially chosen site, particularly if the baby dies during birth. In Cambodia and Costa Rica, burial of the placenta is believed to protect and ensure the health of the baby and the mother. If a mother dies in childbirth, the Aymara of Bolivia bury the placenta in a secret place so that the mother's spirit will not return to claim her baby's life.

The placenta is believed by some communities to have power over the lives of the baby or its parents. Kwakiutl of British Columbia bury girls' placentas to give the girl skill in digging clams, and expose boys' placentas to ravens to encourage future prophetic visions. In Turkey, the proper disposal of the placenta and umbilical cord is believed to promote devoutness in the child later in life. In Transylvania and Japan, interaction with a disposed placenta is thought to influence the parents' future fertility.

Several cultures believe the placenta to be or have been alive, often a relative of the baby. Nepalese think of the placenta as a friend of the baby; the orang Asli and Malay populations in Malay Peninsula regard it as the baby's older sibling. Native Hawaiians believe that the placenta is a part of the baby, and traditionally plant it with a tree that can then grow alongside the child. Various cultures in Indonesia, such as Javanese and Malay, believe that the placenta has a spirit and needs to be buried outside the family house. Some Malays would bury the baby's placenta with a pencil (if it is a boy) or a needle and thread (if it is a girl).

In some cultures, the placenta is eaten, a practice known as human placentophagy. In some eastern cultures, such as China, the dried placenta (ziheche 紫河车, literally "purple river car") is thought to be a healthful restorative and is sometimes used in preparations of traditional Chinese medicine and various health products. The practice of human placentophagy has become a more recent trend in western cultures and is not without controversy; its practice being considered cannibalism is debated.

Some cultures have alternative uses for placenta that include the manufacturing of cosmetics, pharmaceuticals and food.

== Additional images ==
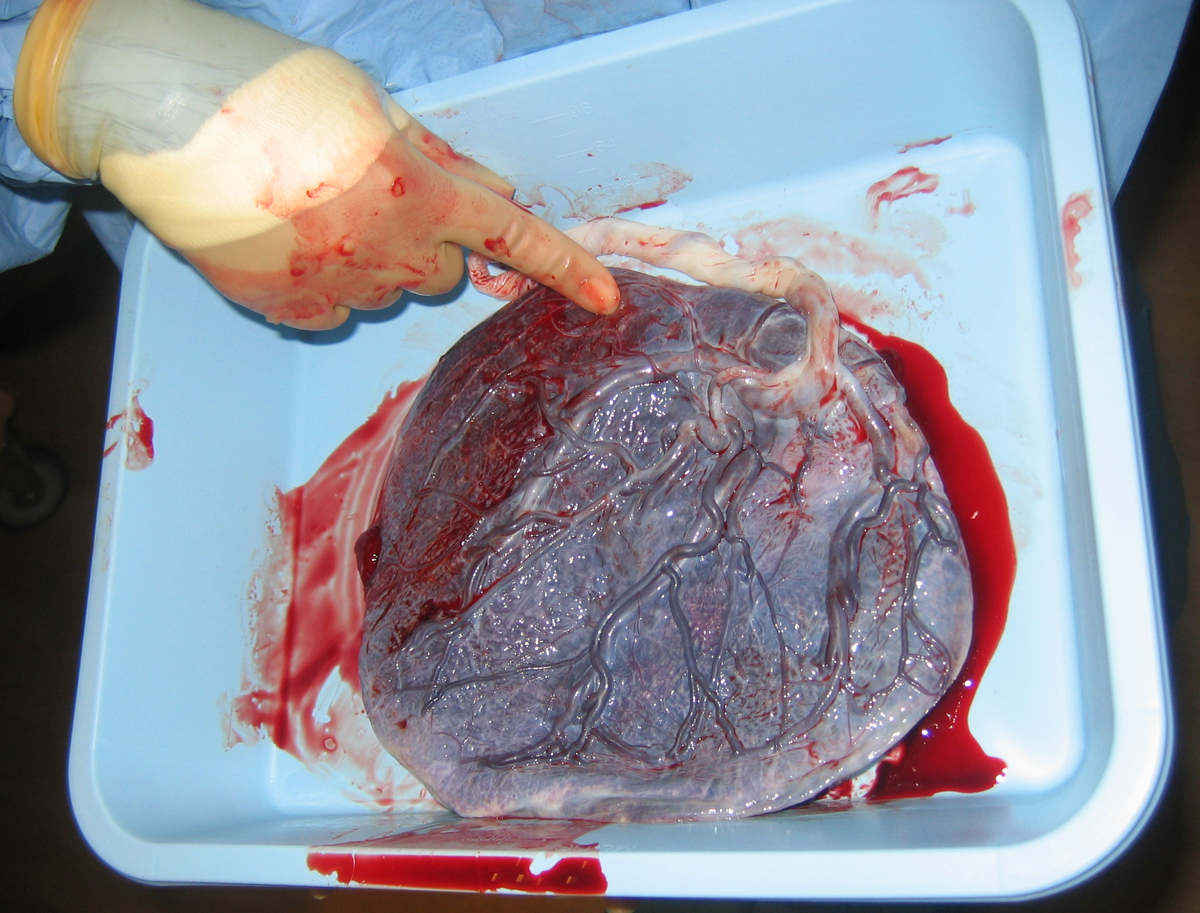
Human placenta immediately post birth.

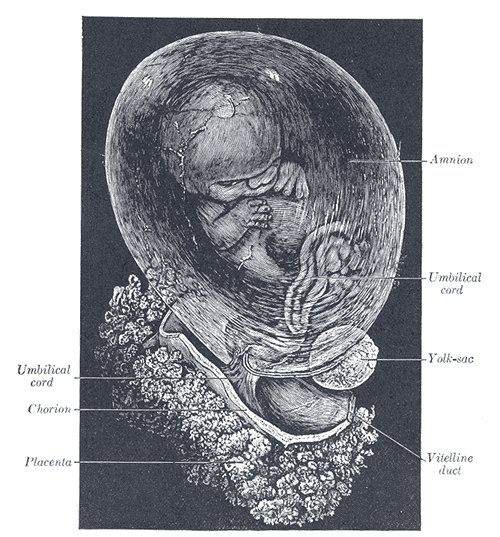
Fetus of about 8 weeks, enclosed in the amnion. Magnified a little over two diameters.

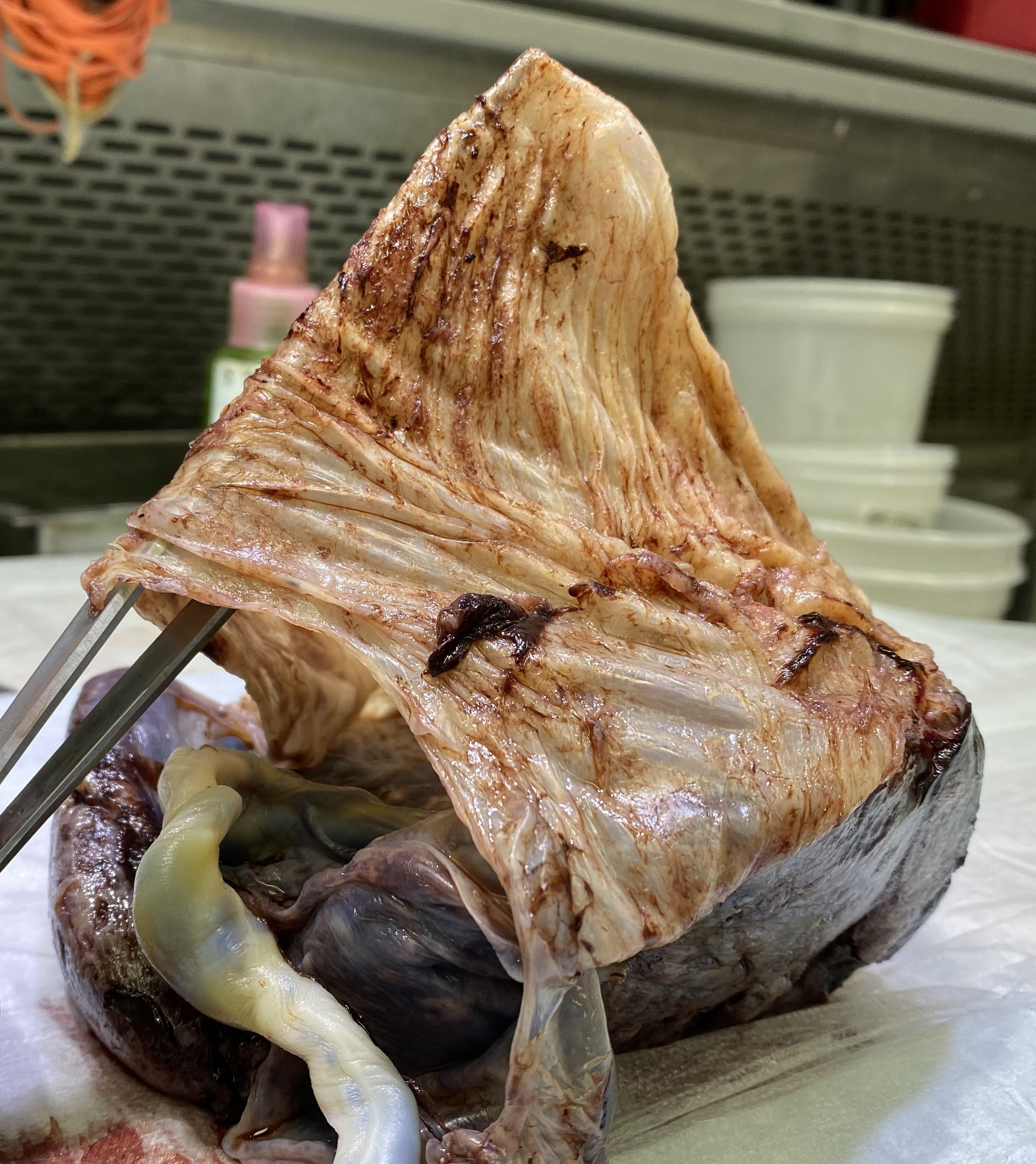
Placenta with attached fetal membranes, ruptured at the margin at the left in the image

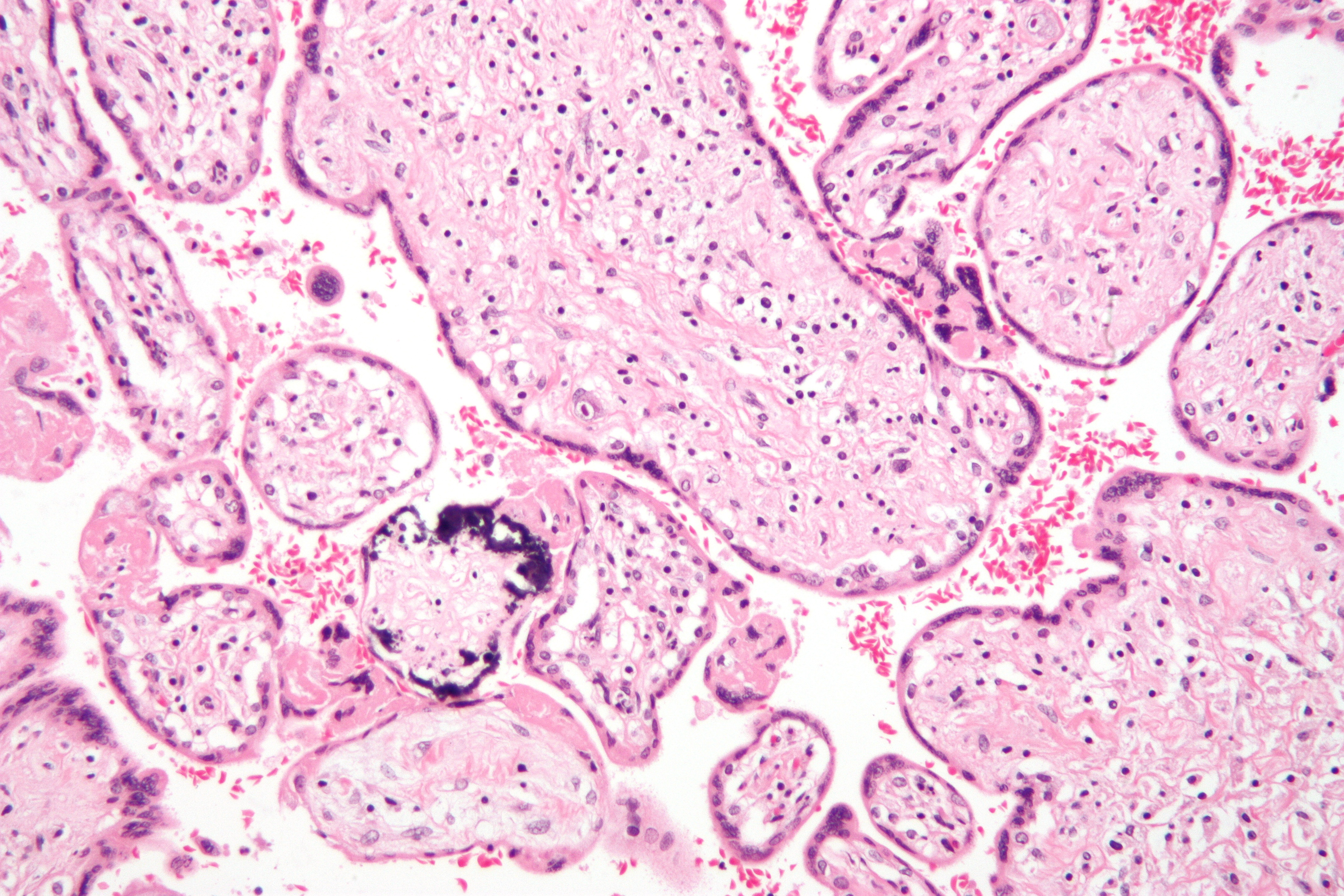
Micrograph of a placental infection (CMV placentitis)

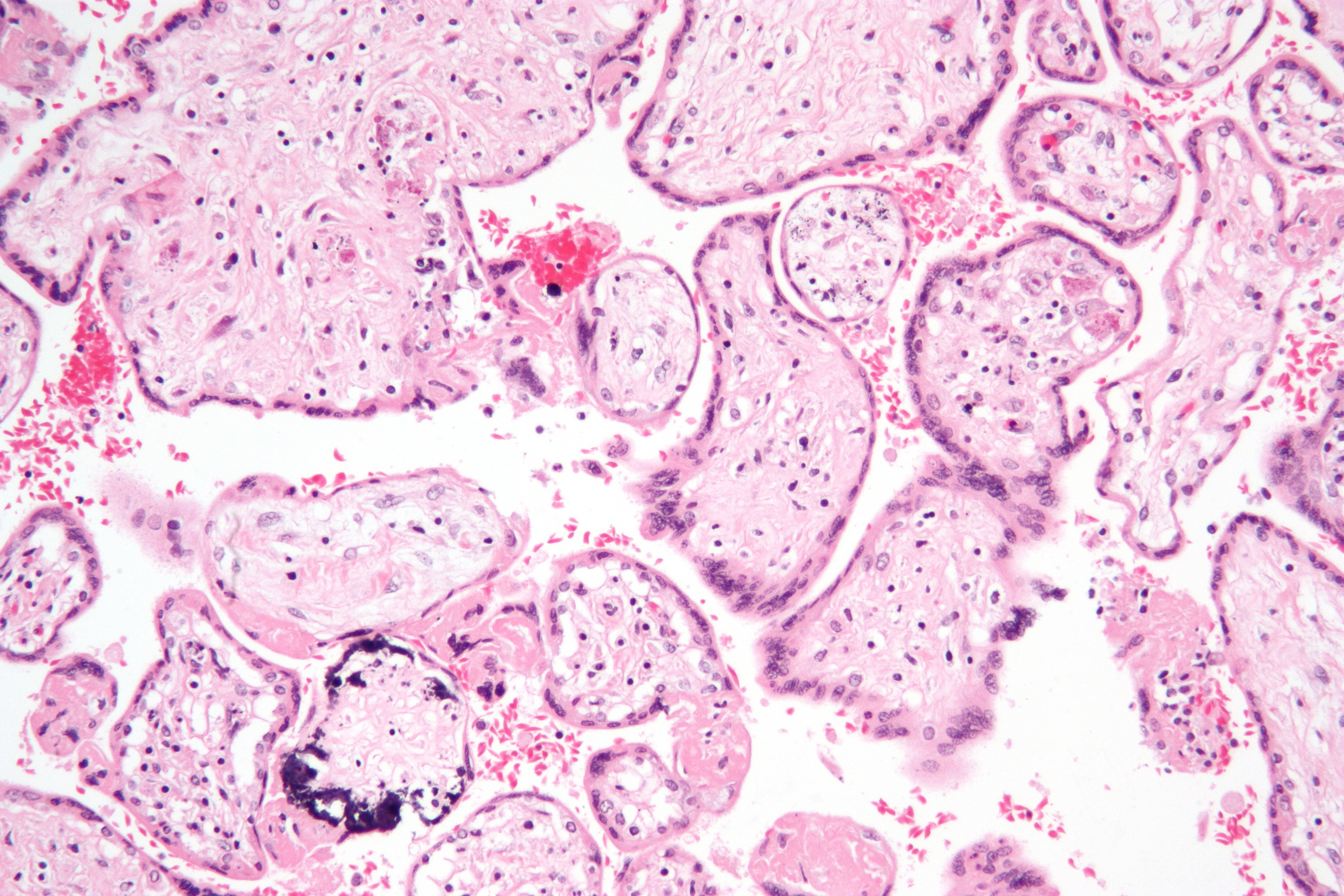
Micrograph of CMV placentitis

A 3D Power Doppler image of vasculature in 20-week placenta

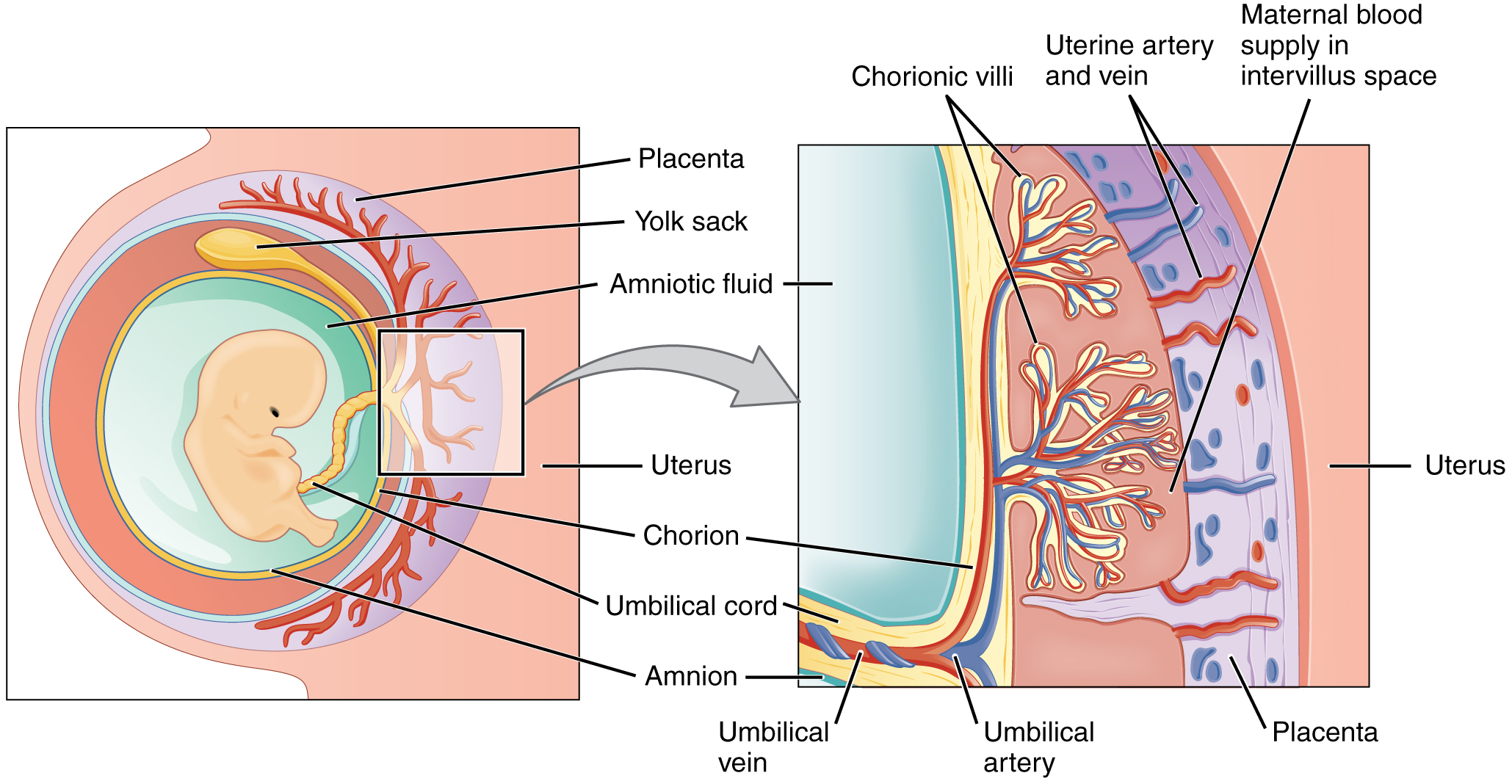
Schematic view of the placenta

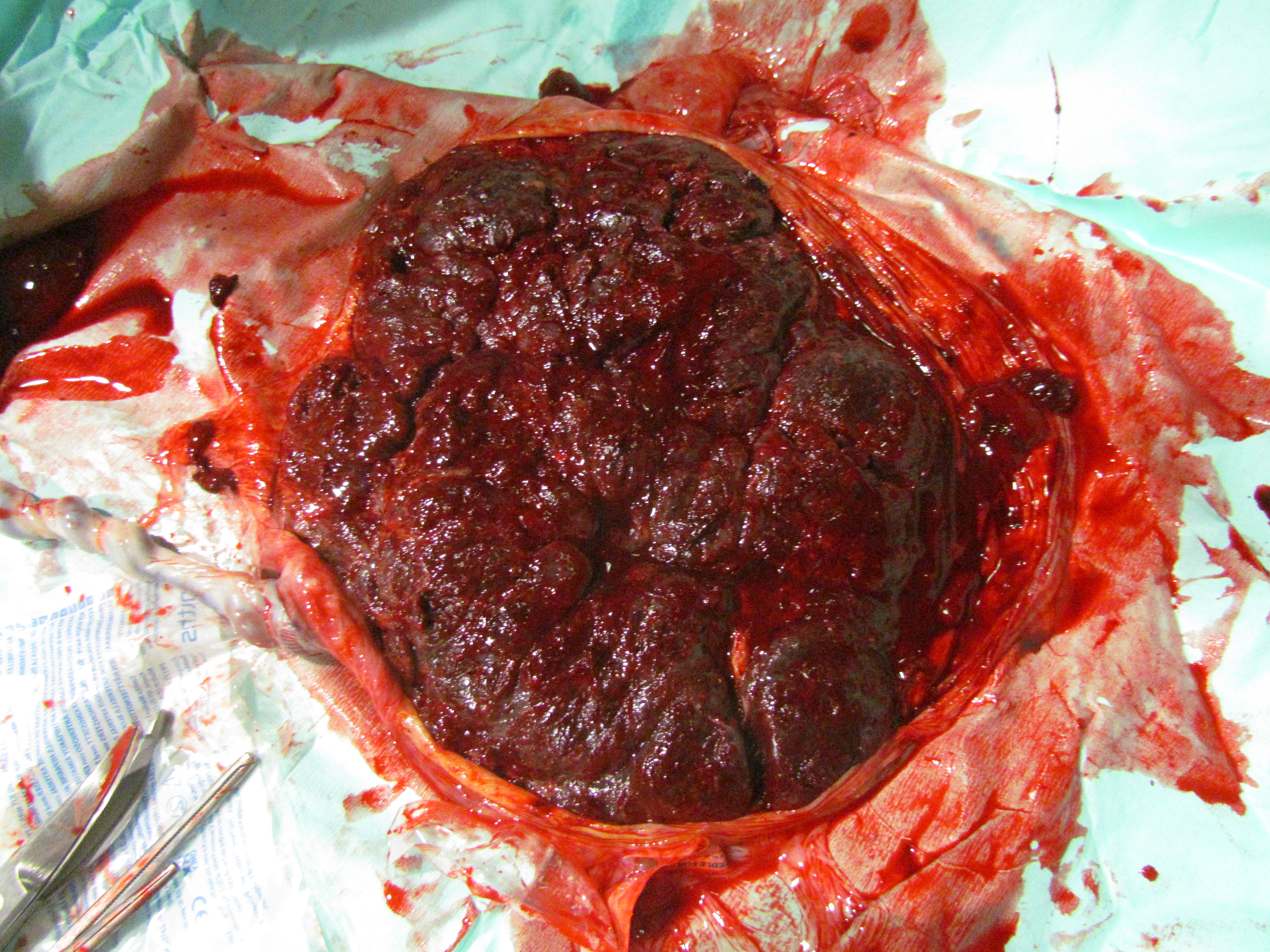
Maternal side of a whole human placenta, just after birth

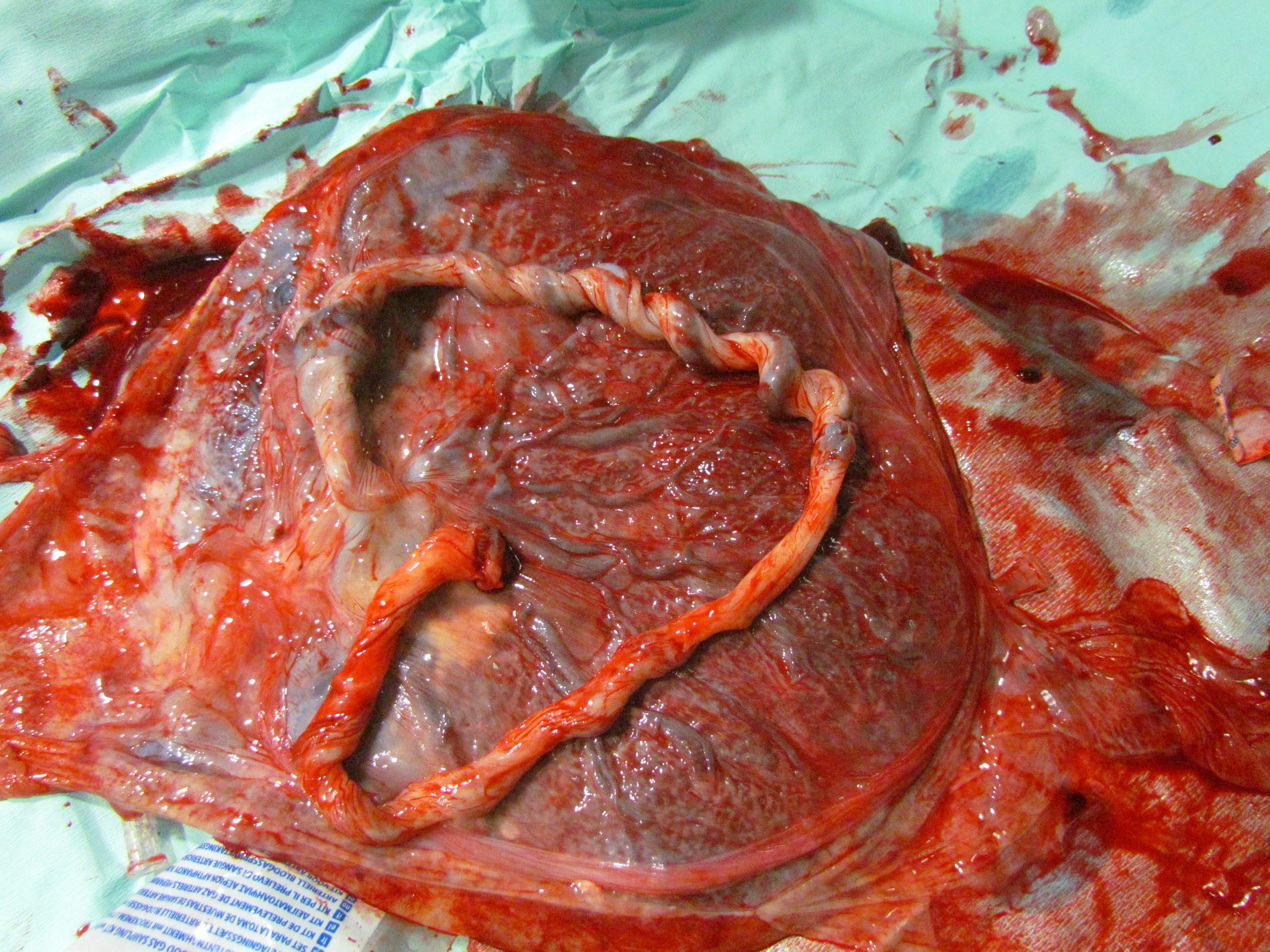
Fetal side of same placenta

Close-up of umbilical attachment to fetal side of freshly delivered placenta

Placenta weight by gestational age

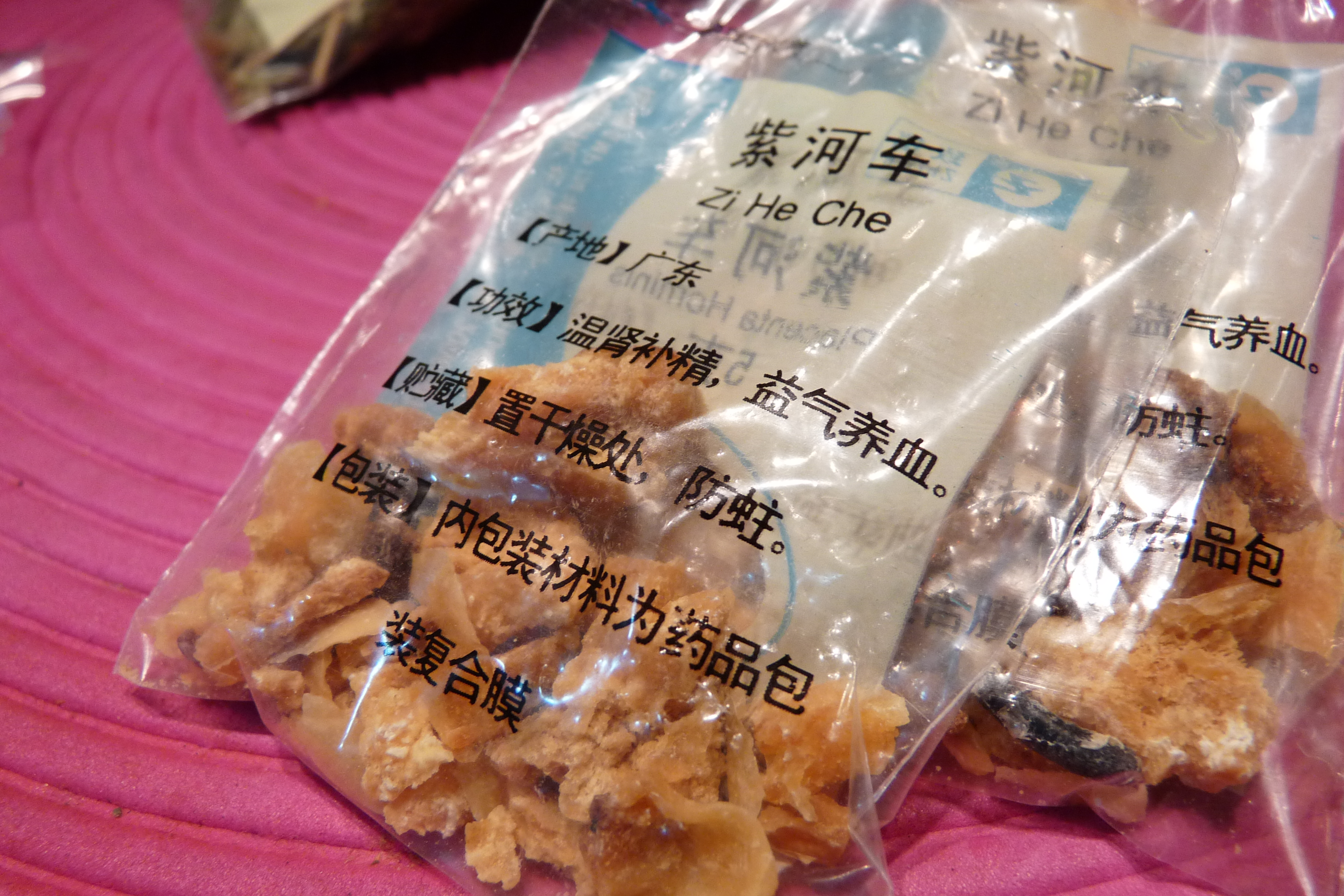
Ziheche (紫河车), dried human placenta used in traditional Chinese medicine

== See also ==
- Caul
- Choriovitelline placenta
- Pregnancy in fish
- Zygote
