= Systemic inflammation =

Inflammation associated with organ systems and the immune system

Systemic inflammation is the result of release of pro-inflammatory cytokines from immune-related cells and the activation of the innate immune system in response. It can contribute to the development or progression of certain conditions such as cardiovascular disease, cancer, diabetes mellitus, chronic kidney disease, non-alcoholic fatty liver disease, autoimmune and neurodegenerative disorders, and coronary heart disease.

== Mechanisms ==
Release of pro-inflammatory cytokines and activation of the innate immune system may be the result of either external (biological or chemical agents) or internal (genetic mutations/variations) factors. The cytokine Interleukin 6 and C-reactive protein are common inflammatory markers used to diagnose systemic inflammation risk. Baseline C-reactive protein levels deviate due to natural genetic variation, but significant increases can result from risk factors such as smoking, obesity, lifestyle, and high blood pressure. Excess advanced glycation end-products attach to RAGE receptors to produce chronic inflammation.

Chronic systemic inflammation increases with age (also known as inflammaging) due to unresolved acute inflammation and an individual's exposome. Age-related systemic chronic inflammation is associated with several cytokines including CXCL9, TRAIL, interferon gamma, CCL11, and CXCL1, and a proposed measurement of chronic systemic inflammation based on these cytokines (iAge) correlates with immunosenescence and predicts risk for cardiovascular disease, frailty syndrome, and multimorbidity. Damaged proteins and other cellular debris can provoke chronic inflammation in the innate immune system.

== Comorbidities ==
It is firmly established that systemic markers for inflammation predict coronary heart disease complications with or without existing heart disease. Inflammation also plays a role in diabetes risk and new research continues to support this conclusion. Cancer is often caused by chronic inflammation.

Research suggests chronic systemic inflammation plays a major role in COVID-19 morbidity. In severe cases, COVID-19 causes a cytokine storm which contributes to excessive and uncontrolled inflammation of organs, particularly respiratory tissues. If untreated, this increased inflammation can result in reduced immune response, pneumonia, lymphoid tissue damage, and death. Individuals with abnormal cytokine production, such as those with obesity or chronic systemic inflammation, have poorer health outcomes from COVID-19. Elevated cytokine production alters the innate immune response which leads to abnormal T-cell and B-Cell function that decreases control of viral replication and host defense. Anti-viral therapeutic drugs which also reduce inflammation seem to be the most effective treatment, but research is still ongoing. Reactive oxygen species are upregulated during inflammation as part of the immune response to defend against pathogens. However, excessive inflammation causes dangerous levels of reactive oxygen species which cause oxidative stress to tissues. The immune system naturally produces antioxidant compounds to regulate and detoxify reactive oxygen species. Anti-oxidative therapy with supplements such as vitamin C, vitamin E, curcumin, or baicalin is speculated to reduce infection severity in COVID-19, but previous research has not found antioxidants supplementation to be effective in the prevention of other diseases. Shifting from the typical western diet to a Mediterranean diet or plant-based diet may improve COVID-19 health outcomes by reducing prevalence of comorbidities (i.e. obesity or hypertension), decreasing intake of pro-inflammatory foods, and increasing consumption of anti-inflammatory and antioxidant nutrients.

== Research ==
While systemic inflammation may be induced by multiple external factors, research suggests that a lack of control by tolerogenic dendritic cells and T-regulatory cells (Treg) is possibly the primary risk factor. In functioning immune responses, T-helper and T-cytotoxic cells are activated by presentation of antigens by antigen-presenting cells (APCs). Chief among these are dendritic cells (DCs). When a DC presents an antigen to a Treg cell, a signal is then sent to the nucleus of the DC, resulting in the production of indoleamine 2,3-dioxygenase (IDO). IDO inhibits T cell responses by depleting tryptophan and producing kynurenine, which is toxic to the cell.

Individuals susceptible to developing chronic systemic inflammation appear to lack proper functioning of Treg cells and TDCs. In these individuals, a lack of control of inflammatory processes results in multiple chemical and food intolerances, and autoimmune diseases.

== See also ==
- List of inflammatory disorders
