= Pappalysin-2 =

Protein found in humans

PAPPA2

Identifiers
- Aliases: PAPPA2, PAPP-A2, PAPP-E, PAPPE, PLAC3, pappalysin 2, SSDA
- External IDs: MGI: 3051647; GeneCards: PAPPA2

Gene location (Human)
Chr.	Chromosome 1 (human)
Band	1q25.2	Start	176,463,171 bp
Band	1q25.2	End	176,845,601 bp

Gene location (Mouse)
Chr.	Chromosome 1 (mouse)
Band	1|1 H1	Start	158,539,297 bp
Band	1|1 H1	End	158,808,060 bp
RNA expression pattern
Bgee	Human / Mouse (ortholog); Top expressed in: decidua; islet of Langerhans; cartilage tissue; ventricular zone; buccal mucosa cell; testicle; ganglionic eminence; human kidney; pancreatic ductal cell; stromal cell of endometrium / Top expressed in: calvaria; islet of Langerhans; lumbar spinal ganglion; pituitary gland; pontine nuclei; trigeminal ganglion; dermis; lobe of prostate; efferent ductule; condyle; More reference expression data
BioGPS	n/a
Gene ontology
Molecular function	zinc ion binding; peptidase activity; hydrolase activity; metallopeptidase activity; metal ion binding; metalloendopeptidase activity
Cellular component	extracellular region; extracellular exosome; intracellular anatomical structure; cytosol; apical plasma membrane
Biological process	bone morphogenesis; regulation of cell growth; proteolysis; response to salt stress
Sources:Amigo / QuickGO
Orthologs
Databases	NCBI: entry; OMA: entry
Species	Human	Mouse
Entrez	60676	23850
Ensembl	ENSG00000116183	ENSMUSG00000073530
UniProt	Q9BXP8	n/a
RefSeq (mRNA)	NM_020318; NM_021936	NM_001085376
RefSeq (protein)	NP_064714; NP_068755	n/a
Location (UCSC)	Chr 1: 176.46 – 176.85 Mb	Chr 1: 158.54 – 158.81 Mb
PubMed search
- Wikidata
View/Edit Human	View/Edit Mouse

Pappalysin-2 also known as pregnancy-associated plasma protein A2 (PAPP-A2) is a protein that in humans is encoded by the PAPPA2 gene.
