= Placental cotyledon =

Vascular structure in the placenta

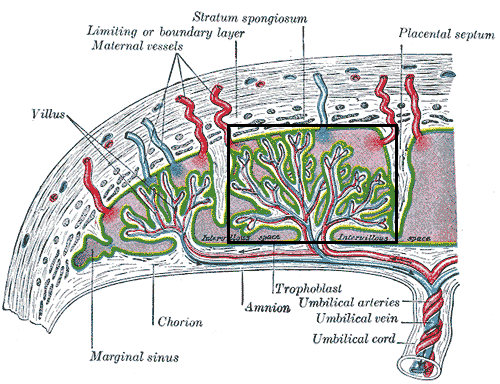
- Structure of the placenta, with a placental cotyledon marked in rectangle.

The placenta of humans, and certain other mammals contains structures known as cotyledons, which transmit fetal blood and allow exchange of oxygen and nutrients with the maternal blood.

== Ruminants ==
The Artiodactyla have a cotyledonary placenta. In this form of placenta, the chorionic villi form a number of separate circular structures (cotyledons) which are distributed over the surface of the chorionic sac. Sheep, goats and cattle have between 75 and 125 cotyledons whereas deer have four to six larger cotyledons.

== Human ==
The form of the human placenta is generally classified as a discoid placenta. Within this, the cotyledons are the approximately 15 to 25 separations of the decidua basalis of the placenta, separated by placental septa. Each cotyledon consists of a main stem of a chorionic villus as well as its branches and sub-branches.

== Vasculature ==
The cotyledons receive fetal blood from chorionic vessels, which branch off cotyledon vessels into the cotyledons, which, in turn, branch into capillaries. The cotyledons are surrounded by maternal blood, which can exchange oxygen and nutrients with the fetal blood in the capillaries.
