= Omphalitis of newborn =

- Specialty: Neonatology

Omphalitis of newborn is the medical term for inflammation of the umbilical cord stump in the neonatal newborn period, most commonly attributed to a bacterial infection. Typically immediately after an infant is born, the umbilical cord is cut with a small remnant (often referred to as the stump) left behind. Normally the stump separates from the skin within 3–45 days after birth. A small amount of pus-like material is commonly seen at the base of the stump and can be controlled by keeping the stump open to air to dry. Certain bacteria can grow and infect the stump during this process and as a result significant redness and swelling may develop, and in some cases the infection can then spread through the umbilical vessels to the rest of the body. While currently an uncommon anatomical location for infection in the newborn in the United States, it has caused significant morbidity and mortality both historically and in areas where health care is less readily available. In general, when this type of infection is suspected or diagnosed, antibiotic treatment is given, and in cases of serious complications surgical management may be appropriate.

== Signs and symptoms ==
Clinically, neonates with omphalitis present within the first two weeks of life with signs and symptoms of a skin infection (cellulitis) around the umbilical stump (redness, warmth, swelling, pain), pus from the umbilical stump, fever, fast heart rate (tachycardia), low blood pressure (hypotension), somnolence, poor feeding, and yellow skin (jaundice). Omphalitis can quickly progress to sepsis and presents a potentially life-threatening infection. In fact, even in cases of omphalitis without evidence of more serious infection such as necrotizing fasciitis, mortality is high (in the 10% range).

== Causes ==
Omphalitis is most commonly caused by bacteria. The culprits usually are Staphylococcus aureus, Streptococcus, and Escherichia coli. The infection is typically caused by a combination of these organisms and is a mixed Gram-positive and Gram-negative infection. Anaerobic bacteria can also be involved.

== Diagnosis ==
In a normal umbilical stump, you first see the umbilicus lose its characteristic bluish-white, moist appearance and become dry and black After several days to weeks, the stump should fall off and leave a pink fleshy wound which continues to heal as it becomes a normal umbilicus.

For an infected umbilical stump, diagnosis is usually made by the clinical appearance of the umbilical cord stump and the findings on history and physical examination. There may be some confusion, however, if a well-appearing neonate simply has some redness around the umbilical stump. In fact, a mild degree is common, as is some bleeding at the stump site with detachment of the umbilical cord. The picture may be clouded even further if caustic agents have been used to clean the stump or if silver nitrate has been used to cauterize granulomata of the umbilical stump.

== Prevention ==
During the 1950s there were outbreaks of omphalitis that then led to anti-bacterial treatment of the umbilical cord stump as the new standard of care. It was later determined that in developed countries keeping the cord dry is sufficient, (known as "dry cord care") as recommended by the American Academy of Pediatrics. The umbilical cord dries more quickly and separates more readily when exposed to air However, each hospital/birthing center has its own recommendations for care of the umbilical cord after delivery. Some recommend not using any medicinal washes on the cord. Other popular recommendations include triple dye, betadine, bacitracin, or silver sulfadiazine. With regards to the medicinal treatments, there is little data to support any one treatment (or lack thereof) over another. However one recent review of many studies supported the use of chlorhexidine treatment as a way to reduce risk of death by 23% and risk of omphalitis by anywhere between 27 and 56% in community settings in underdeveloped countries. This study also found that this treatment increased the time that it would take for the umbilical stump to separate or fall off by 1.7 days. Lastly this large review also supported the notion that in hospital settings no medicinal type of cord care treatment was better at reducing infections compared to dry cord care.

== Treatment ==
Treatment consists of antibiotic therapy aimed at the typical bacterial pathogens in addition to supportive care for any complications which might result from the infection itself such as hypotension or respiratory failure. A typical regimen will include intravenous antibiotics such as from the penicillin-group which is active against Staphylococcus aureus and an aminoglycoside for activity against Gram-negative bacteria. For particularly invasive infections, antibiotics to cover anaerobic bacteria may be added (such as metronidazole). Treatment is typically for two weeks and often necessitates insertion of a central venous catheter or peripherally inserted central catheter.

== Epidemiology ==
The current incidence in the United States is somewhere around 0.5% per year; overall, the incidence rate for developed world falls between 0.2 and 0.7%. In developing countries, the incidence of omphalitis varies from 2 to 7 for 100 live births. There does not appear to be any racial or ethnic predilection.

Like many bacterial infections, omphalitis is more common in those patients who have a weakened or deficient immune system or who are hospitalized and subject to invasive procedures. Therefore, infants who are premature, sick with other infections such as blood infection (sepsis) or pneumonia, or who have immune deficiencies are at greater risk. Infants with normal immune systems are at risk if they have had a prolonged birth, birth complicated by infection of the placenta (chorioamnionitis), or have had umbilical catheters.
