= Funisitis =

Inflammation of the connective tissue of the umbilical cord

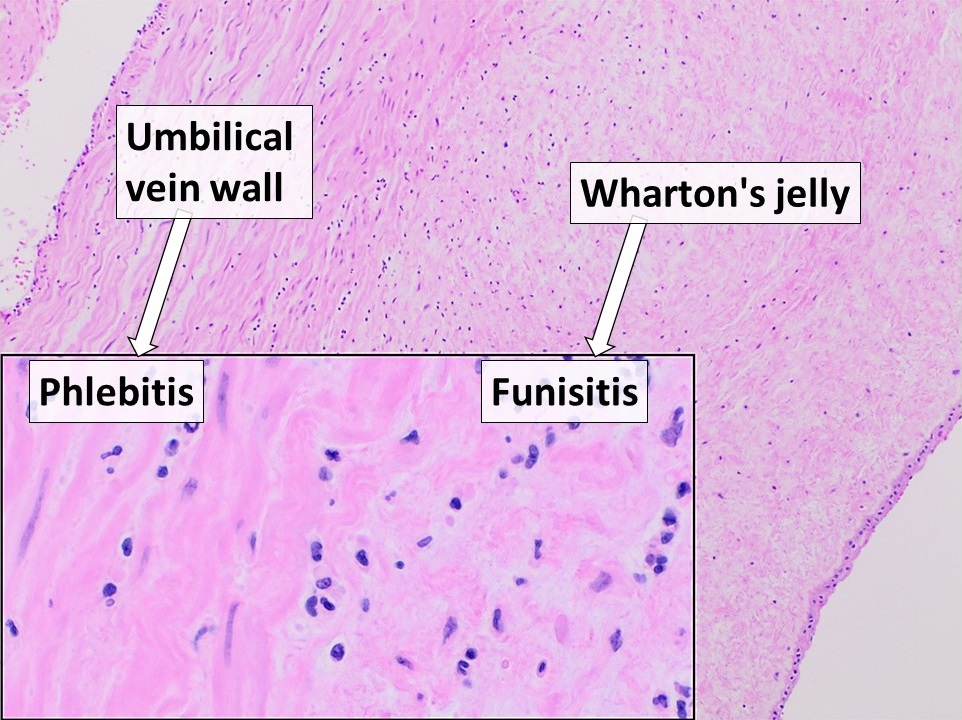
Histopathology of phlebitis (inflammation of a vein, in this case an umbilical vein) and funisitis (inflammation of the connective tissue of the umbilical cord), with neutrophils (high magnification in bottom insert).

Funisitis is inflammation of the connective tissue of the umbilical cord that occurs with chorioamnionitis. It involves only the external cord surface and Wharton's jelly. It has no involvement of the vessels. It does not involve the umbilical stump, which would be seen in omphalitis.

== Necrotizing funisitis ==
Necrotizing funisitis is a severe form of funisitis that occurs when the funisitis has been present for a long time. Debris from inflammatory cells accumulates, and the cord becomes calcified. Treatment with IV antibiotics is necessary for necrotizing funisitis, with a minimum of 7 days. This can occur in healthy newborn infants; the infection typically develops in the days and weeks following birth. With IV antibiotic treatment and early management, outcomes are good.

== Syphilis association ==
It could be associated with congenital syphilis, which is noted in a journal from 1999. It is now rare, and seen almost exclusively in the preterm infant. The majority of these affected infants are stillborn, or die within a few weeks of birth.

== Treatment ==
The most common treatment for funisitis is antibiotics. If a woman has chorioamnionitis, the most effective antibiotics are ampicillin and gentamicin. However, if you're allergic to penicillin, you may need to use other antibiotics, such as clindamycin, cefazolin, or vancomycin. After giving birth, the official recommendation is to administer one dose of antibiotics with a cesarean section, but this doesn't always happen. If you deliver vaginally, you may need to take antibiotics for a longer period of time, depending on the situation.

== See also ==
- Chorioamnionitis
- Placentitis
