= Umbilical vessels =

Umbilical vessels can refer to:

- Umbilical artery, one of a pair of blood vessels that supply deoxygenated blood from within the fetus to the placenta
- Umbilical vein, a blood vessel that carries oxygenated blood from the placenta into the fetus
