= Pancolitis =

- Other names: Universal colitis
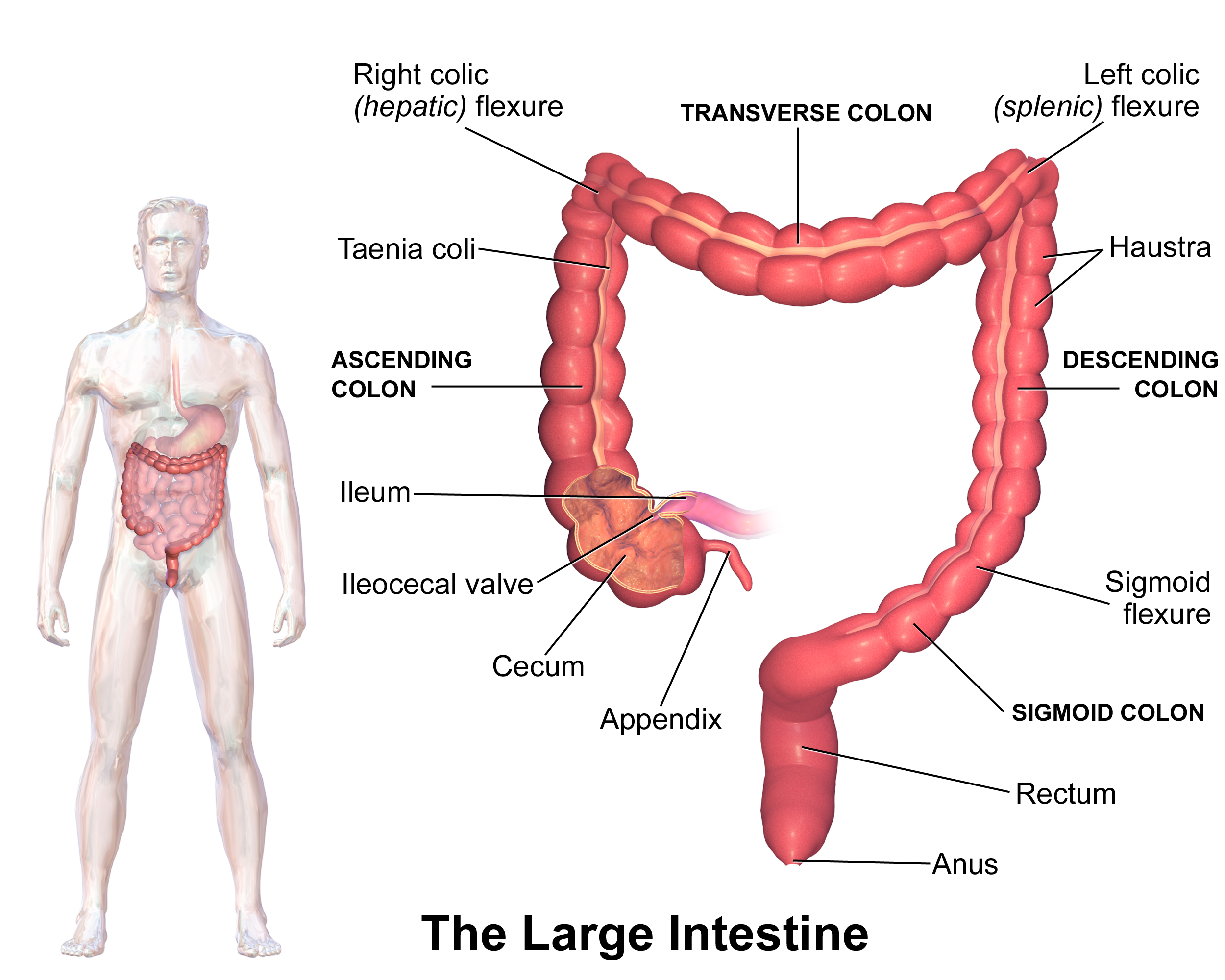
- Image of the parts of the large intestine
- Specialty: Gastroenterology
- Symptoms: Abdominal pain, rectal bleeding

Pancolitis or universal colitis, in its most general sense, refers to inflammation of the entire large intestine comprising the cecum, ascending, transverse, descending, sigmoid colon and rectum. It can be caused by a variety of things such as inflammatory bowel disease, more specifically a severe form of ulcerative colitis. A diagnosis can be made using a number of techniques but the most accurate method is direct visualization via a colonoscopy. Symptoms are similar to those of ulcerative colitis but more severe and affect the entire large intestine. Patients generally exhibit symptoms including rectal bleeding as a result of ulcers, pain in the abdominal region, inflammation in varying degrees, and diarrhea (often containing blood), fatigue, fever, and night sweats. Due to the loss of function in the large intestine patients may lose large amounts of weight from being unable to procure nutrients from food. In other cases the blood loss from ulcers can result in anemia which can be treated with iron supplements. Additionally, due to the chronic nature of most cases of pancolitis, patients have a higher chance of developing colorectal cancer.

The precise causes of pancolitis are unclear, although physicians currently believe that autoimmune diseases and genetic predispositions might play a role in its progress. Genes that are known to put individuals at risk for Crohn's disease have been shown to also increase risk of other IBD including pancolitis. Furthermore, an individual may also develop pancolitis if ulcerative colitis of only a small portion of the colon is left untreated or worsens. Current treatment of pancolitis is focused on forcing the disease into remission, a state where the majority of the symptoms subside. Ultimately, the goal is to reach an improved quality of life, reduction in need for medicine, and minimization of the risk of cancer. Medication utilized in treatment includes anti-inflammatory agents and corticosteroids to alleviate inflammation and immunomodulators which act to suppress the immune system. Immunomodulators are used in severe cases of ulcerative colitis and often utilized to treat patients with pancolitis who have shown little improvement with anti-inflammatories and corticosteroids. However, in this case it can further expose the patient to other diseases due to the compromised immune system. A final option of treatment is available in the form of colorectal surgery. Generally, this option is reserved for only the cases in which cancer development is highly suspected or major internal bleeding from ulcers occurs. In this case the entire colon and rectum are removed which both cures the pancolitis and prevents any chance of colon cancer.
