= Chorionic vessels =

Blood vessels in fetoplacental circulation

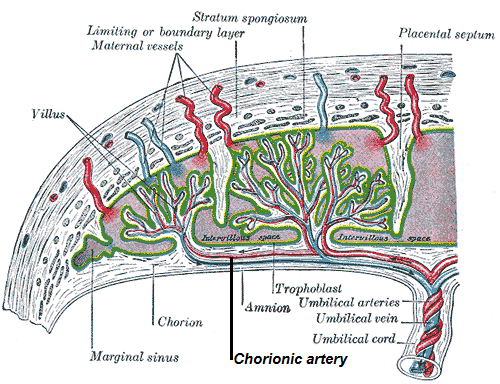
Vasculature of the placenta, with a chorionic artery labeled in .

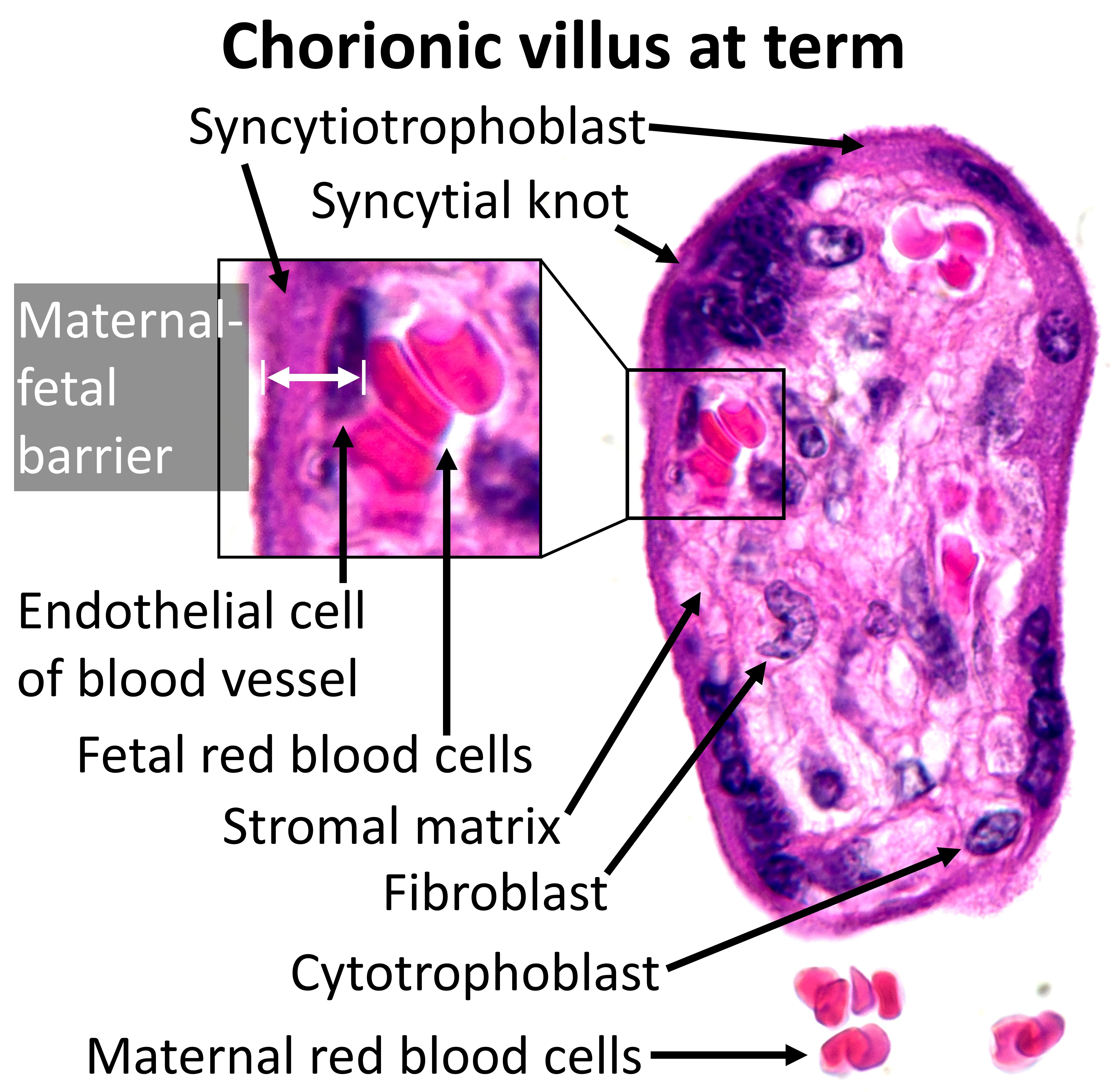
High-magnification H&E of a chorionic villus, with insert showing a magnification of a chorionic vessel.

Chorionic (plate) vessels, also fetal surface vessels are blood vessels, including both arteries and veins, that carry blood through the chorion in the fetoplacental circulation. Chorionic arteries branch off the umbilical artery, and supply the capillaries of the chorionic villi. Increased vasocontractility of chorionic arteries may contribute to preeclampsia.
