= Placentitis =

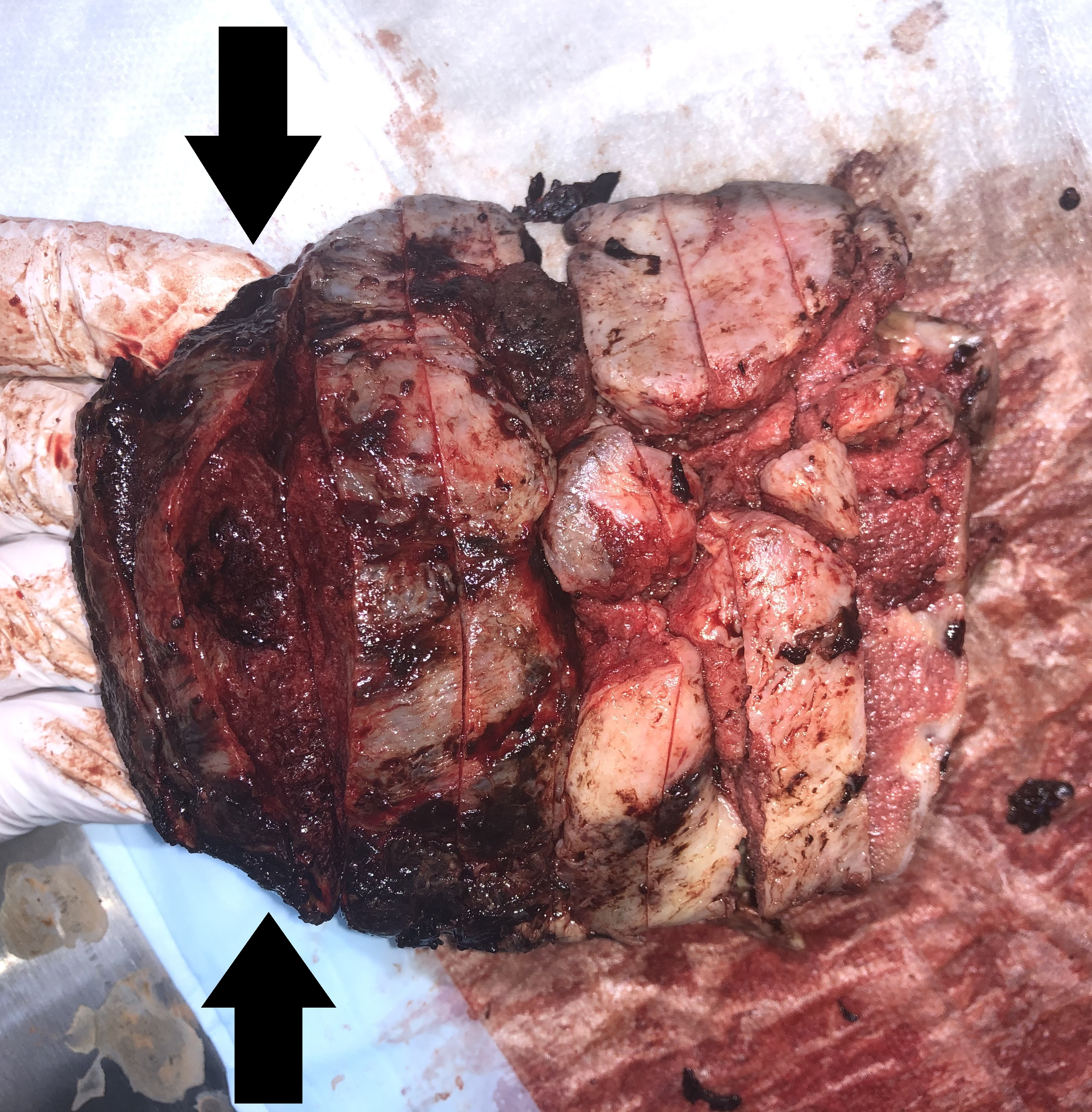
- Gross pathology of severe intervillositis, with dark red and soggy tissue.
- Specialty: OB/GYN

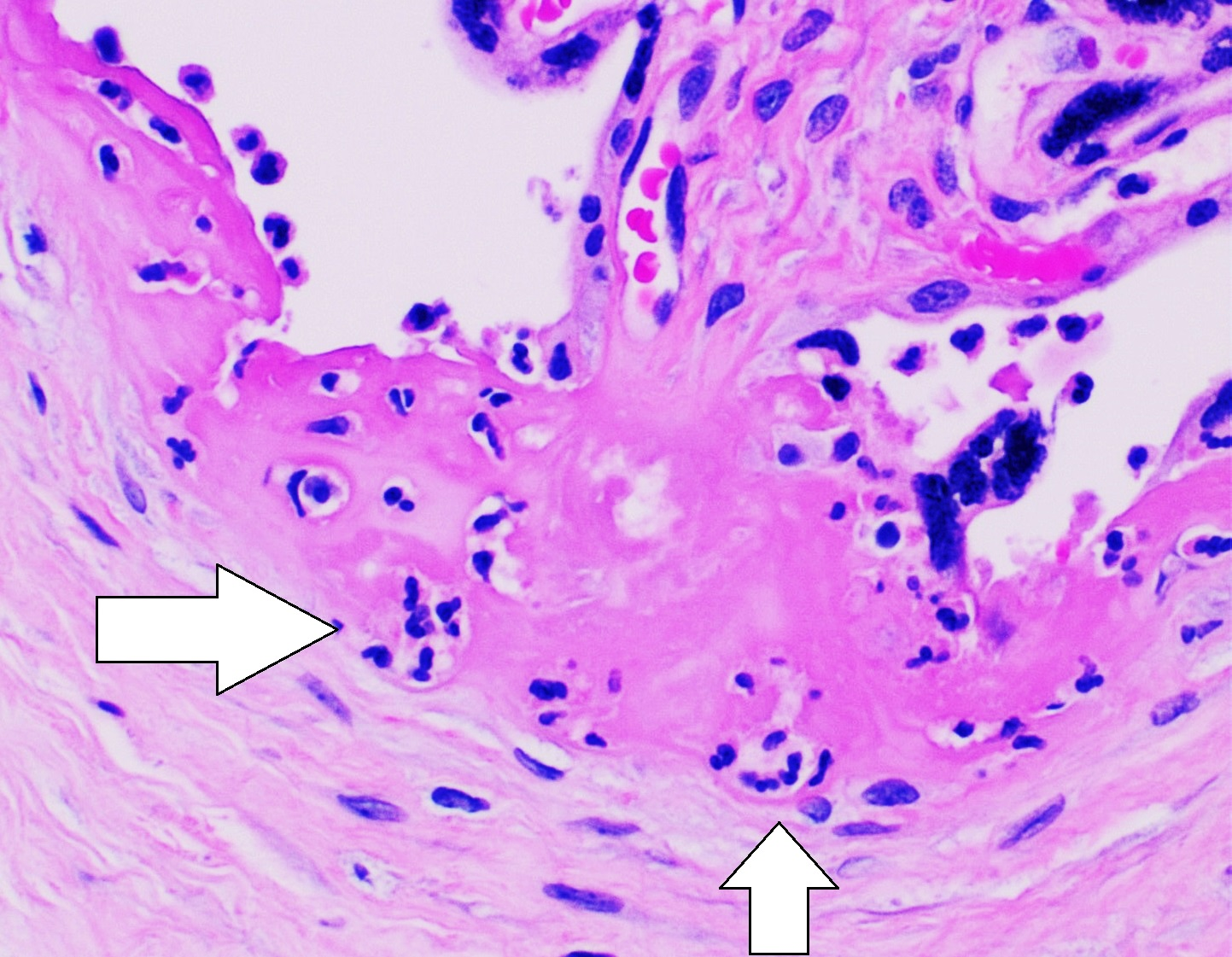
Histopathology of acute subchorionic intervillositis, with neutrophils in Langhan’s layer of fibrinoid (by the fetal surface, at the base of a chorionic villus, seen at top right).

Placentitis is an inflammation of the placenta. The main forms of placentitis are:

- Villitis, inflammation of chorionic villi.
- Intervillositis, inflammation of the intervillous space.

It may be caused by vertically transmitted infections.

Because of the close proximity, placentitis often occurs simultaneously as funisitis (inflammation of the umbilical cord) and chorioamnionitis (inflammation of the fetal membranes).

Chronic lymphocytic placental inflammation occurs in 5% to 15% of pregnancies, and are generally not associated with documented infection.

== Villitis of unknown etiology ==
Villitis of unknown etiology (VUE), also known as chronic villitis, is a placental injury. VUE is an inflammatory condition involving the chorionic villi (placental villi). VUE is a recurrent condition and can be associated with intrauterine growth restriction (IUGR). IUGR involves the poor growth of the foetus, stillbirth, miscarriage, and premature delivery. VUE recurs in about 1/3 of subsequent pregnancies.

VUE is a common lesion characterised by inflammation in the placental chorionic villi. VUE is also characterised by the transfer of maternal lymphocytes across the placenta.

VUE is diagnosed in 7–10% placentas in pregnancies. Roughly 80% of the VUE cases are in term placentas (greater than 37 weeks of pregnancy). A case of VUE in a placenta less than 32 weeks old should be screened for infectious villitis.

== Chronic histiocytic intervillositis ==
Chronic Histiocytic Intervillositis (CHI or CHIV) also known as Chronic Intervillositis of Unknown (A)etiology (CIUE) and Massive Chronic Intervillositis (MCI) is defined as a diffuse infiltration of mononuclear cells (histiocytes, lymphocytes, monocytes) of maternal origin into the intervillous space within the placenta. It often results in severe intrauterine growth restriction which can lead to miscarriage or stillbirth. Overall perinatal mortality rate is high: 41% to 77%. Recurrence rate is also high: 67% to 100%.

== See also ==
- Chorioamnionitis
