= Parathyroiditis =

Disease

- Specialty: Endocrinology

Parathyroiditis is a condition involving inflammation of the parathyroid gland.It can be associated with hyperparathyroidism, though most cases are asymptomatic.
