= Chorioamnionitis =

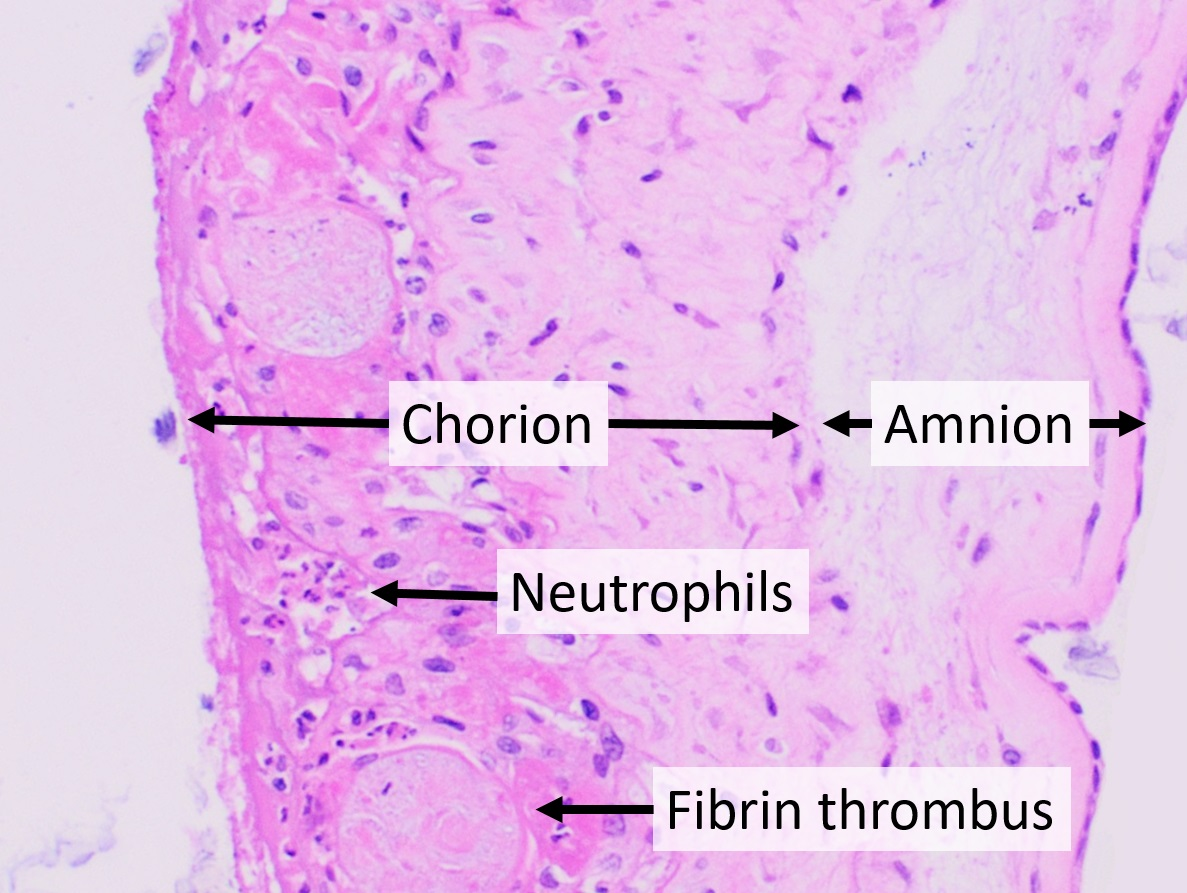
- Micrograph showing acute chorioamnionitis, with neutrophils in the chorion. Also seen are fibrin thrombi, which indicate a severe fetal inflammatory response. H&E stain.
- Specialty: Obstetrics and gynaecology

Chorioamnionitis, also known as amnionitis and intra-amniotic infection (IAI), is inflammation of the fetal membranes (amnion and chorion), usually due to bacterial infection. In 2015, a National Institute of Child Health and Human Development Workshop expert panel recommended use of the term "triple I" to address the heterogeneity of this disorder. The term triple I refers to intrauterine infection or inflammation or both and is defined by strict diagnostic criteria, but this terminology has not been commonly adopted, although the criteria are used.

Chorioamnionitis results from an infection caused by bacteria ascending from the vagina into the uterus and is associated with premature or prolonged labor. It triggers an inflammatory response to release various inflammatory signaling molecules, leading to increased prostaglandin and metalloproteinase release. These substances promote uterine contractions and cervical ripening, causing premature birth. The risk of developing chorioamnionitis increases with the number of vaginal examinations performed in the final month of pregnancy, including labor. Tobacco and alcohol use also puts mothers at risk for chorioamnionitis development.

Chorioamnionitis is caught early by looking at signs and symptoms such as fever, abdominal pain, or abnormal vaginal discharge. Administration of antibiotics if the amniotic sac bursts prematurely can prevent chorioamnionitis occurrence.

== Signs and symptoms ==
The signs and symptoms of clinical chorioamnionitis include fever, leukocytosis (>15,000 cells/mm^{3}), maternal (>100 bpm) or fetal (>160 bpm) tachycardia, uterine tenderness and preterm rupture of membranes.

== Causes ==
Causes of chorioamnionitis stem from bacterial infection as well as obstetric and other related factors.

=== Microorganisms ===
Bacterial, viral, and even fungal infections can cause chorioamnionitis. Most commonly from Ureaplasma, Fusobacterium, and Streptococcus bacteria species. Less commonly, Gardnerella, Mycoplasma, and Bacteroides bacteria species. Sexually transmitted infections, chlamydia and gonorrhea, can cause development of the condition as well. Studies are continuing to identify other microorganism classes and species as infection sources.

=== Obstetric risk ===
Birthing-related events, lifestyle, and ethnic background have been linked to an increase in the risk of developing chorioamnionitis apart from bacterial causation. Premature deliveries, ruptures of the amniotic sac membranes, prolonged labor, and primigravida childbirth are associated with this condition. At term, mothers who experience a combination of pre-labor membrane ruptures and multiple invasive vaginal examinations, prolonged labor, or have meconium appear in the amniotic fluid are at higher risk than at-term mothers experiencing just one of those events. In other studies, smoking, alcohol use, and drug use are noted as risk factors. Those of African American ethnicity are noted to be at higher risk.

== Anatomy ==
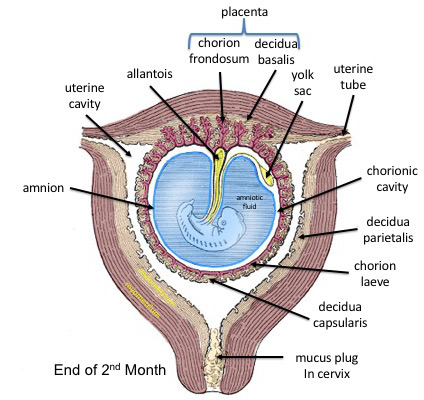
The chorion and amnion membranes are labelled in this depiction of a growing fetus in the uterus.

The amniotic sac consists of two parts:

- The outer membrane is the chorion. It is closest to the mother and physically supports the much thinner amniotic membrane.
  - The chorion is the last and outermost of the membranes that make up the amniotic sac.
- The inner membrane is the amnion. It is in direct contact with the amniotic fluid, which surrounds the fetus.
  - The amniotic fluid exists within the amniotic sac, and is where the fetus can grow and develop.
  - The swelling of the amniotic membrane and chorion is characteristic of chorioamnionitis, occurring when bacteria makes its way into the amniotic fluid and create an infection within the amniotic fluid.

== Diagnosis ==
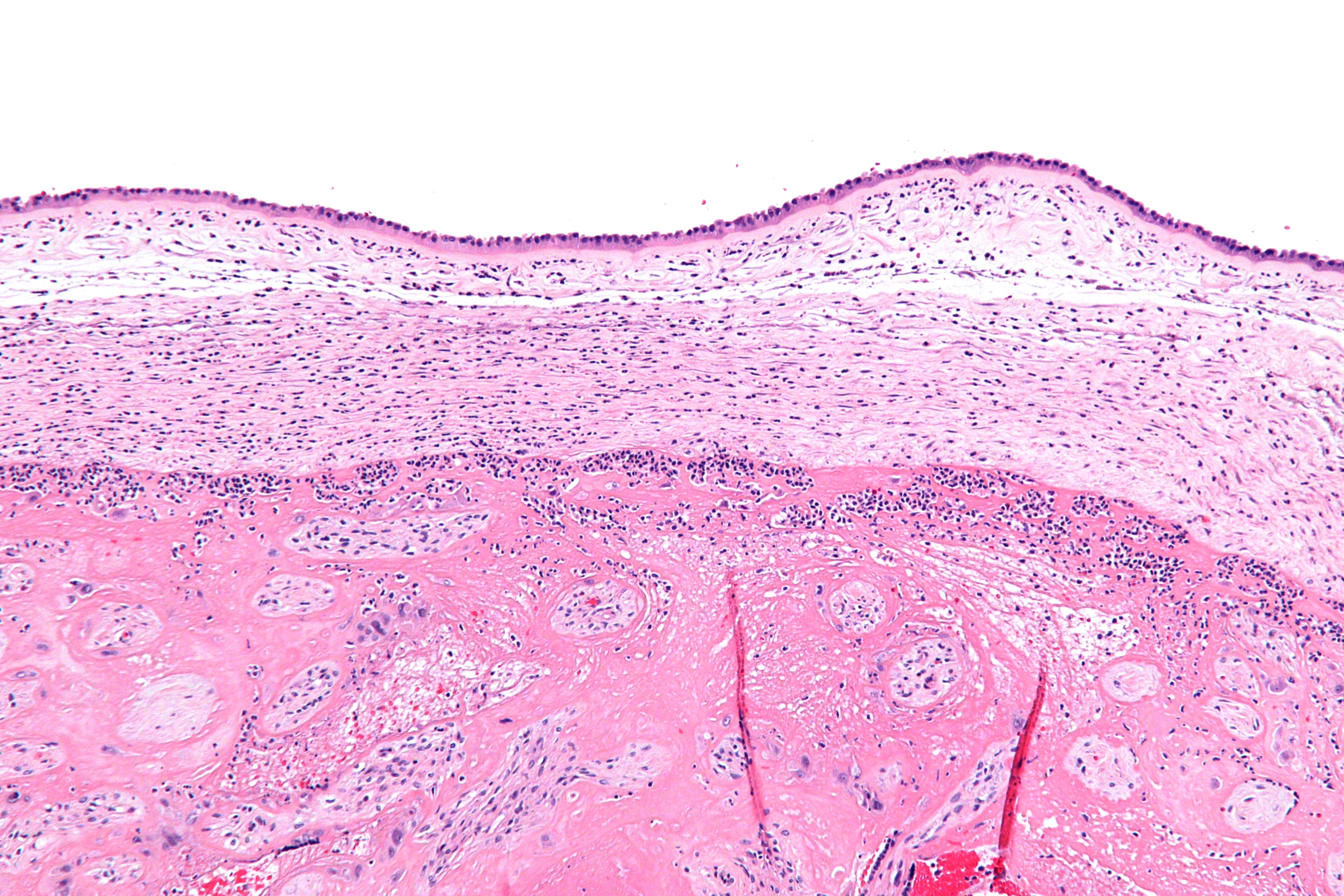
Intermediate magnification micrograph of moderate chorioamnionitis. H&E stain.

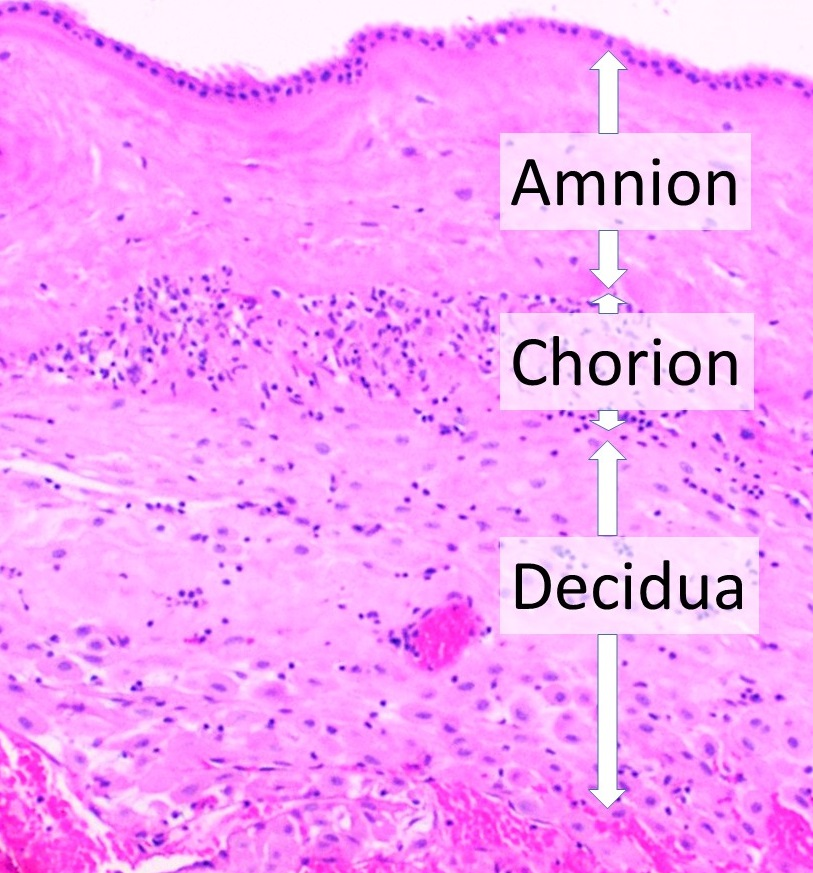
Acute choriodeciduitis, with neutrophils seen in the chorion and decidua. H&E stain.

=== Pathologic ===
Chorioamnionitis is diagnosed from a histologic (tissue) examination of the fetal membranes. Confirmed histologic chorioamnionitis without any clinical symptoms is termed subclinical chorioamnionitis and is more common than symptomatic clinical chorioamnionitis.

Infiltration of the chorionic plate by neutrophils is diagnostic of (mild) chorioamnionitis. More severe chorioamnionitis involves subamniotic tissue and may have fetal membrane necrosis and/or abscess formation.

Severe chorioamnionitis may be accompanied by vasculitis of the umbilical blood vessels due to the fetus's inflammatory cells. If very severe, funisitis, inflammation of the umbilical cord connective tissue, occurs.

=== Suspected clinical diagnosis ===
The presence of fever between 38.0°C and 39.0°C alone is insufficient to indicate chorioamnionitis and is termed isolated maternal fever. Isolated maternal fever may not have an infectious cause and does not require antibiotic treatment.

When intrapartum (during delivery) fever is higher than 39.0°C, a suspected diagnosis of chorioamnionitis can be made. Alternatively, if intrapartum fever is between 38.0°C and 39.0°C, an additional risk factor must be present to make a presumptive diagnosis of chorioamnionitis. Additional risk factors include:

- Fetal tachycardia
- Maternal leukocytosis (>15,000 cells/mm^{3})
- Purulent cervical drainage

=== Confirmed diagnosis ===
Diagnosis is typically not confirmed until after delivery. However, people with confirmed and suspected diagnoses have the same post-delivery treatment regardless of diagnostic status. Diagnosis can be confirmed histologically or through amniotic fluid tests such as Gram staining, glucose levels, or other culture results consistent with infection.

== Prevention ==
If the amniotic sac breaks early in pregnancy, the potential of introducing bacteria into the amniotic fluid can increase. Administering antibiotics maternally can potentially prevent chorioamnionitis and allow for a longer pregnancy. In addition, it has been shown that it is not necessary to deliver the fetus quickly after chorioamnionitis is diagnosed, so a C-section is not necessary unless maternal health concerns are present. However, research has found that beginning labor early at approximately 34 weeks can lessen the likelihood of fetal death and reduce the potential for excessive infection within the mother.

In addition, providers should interview people suspected of having chorioamnionitis about whether they are experiencing signs and symptoms at scheduled obstetrics visits during pregnancy, including whether the individual has experienced excretion vaginally, febrile, or abdominal pain.

== Treatment ==
The American College of Obstetricians and Gynecologists' Committee Opinion proposes the use of antibiotic treatment in intrapartum mothers with suspected or confirmed chorioamnionitis and maternal fever without an identifiable cause.

Intrapartum antibiotic treatment consists of:

- Standard
  - Ampicillin + gentamicin
- Alternative
  - Ampicillin/sulbactam
  - Ticarcillin/clavulanate
  - Cefoxitine
  - Cefotetan
  - Piperacillin/tazobactam
  - Ertapenem
- Cesarean delivery
  - Ampicillin and gentamicin plus either clindamycin or metronidazole
- Penicillin-allergy
  - Vancomycin + gentamicin
  - Gentamicin + clindamycin

However, there is not enough evidence to support the most efficient antimicrobial regimen. Starting the treatment during the intrapartum period is more effective than starting it postpartum; it shortens the hospital stay for the mother and the neonate. There is currently not enough evidence to dictate how long antibiotic therapy should last. Completion of treatment/cure is only considered after delivery.

=== Supportive measures ===
Acetaminophen is often used for treating fevers and may be beneficial for fetal tachycardia. There can be an increased likelihood of neonatal encephalopathy when mothers have intrapartum fever.

== Outcomes ==
Chorioamnionitis has possible associations with numerous neonatal conditions. Intrapartum (during labor) chorioamnionitis may be associated with neonatal pneumonia, meningitis, sepsis, and death. Long-term infant complications like bronchopulmonary dysplasia, cerebral palsy, and Wilson-Mikity syndrome have been associated to the bacterial infection. Furthermore, histological chorioamnionitis may increase the likelihood of newborn necrotizing enterocolitis, where one or more sections of the bowel die. This occurs when the fetal gut barrier becomes compromised and is more susceptible to conditions like infection and sepsis. In addition, chorioamnionitis can act as a risk factor for premature birth and periventricular leukomalacia.

=== Complications ===
For the mother and fetus, chorioamnionitis may lead to short-term and long-term issues when microbes move to different areas or trigger inflammatory responses due to infection.

==== Maternal complications ====
- Higher risk for C-section
- Postpartum hemorrhage
- Endometritis
- Bacteremia (often due to Group B streptococcus and Escherichia coli)
- Pelvic abscess

Mothers with chorioamnionitis who undergo a C-section may be more likely to develop pelvic abscesses, septic pelvic thrombophlebitis, and infections at the surgical site.

==== Fetal complications ====
- Fetal death
- Neonatal sepsis

==== Neonatal complications ====
- Perinatal death
- Asphyxia
- Early onset neonatal sepsis
- Septic shock
- Neonatal pneumonia
- Infant respiratory distress

In the long-term, infants may be more likely to experience cerebral palsy or neurodevelopmental disabilities. Disability development is related to the activation of the fetal inflammatory response syndrome (FIRS) when the fetus is exposed to infected amniotic fluid or other foreign entities. This systemic response results in neutrophil and cytokine release that can impair the fetal brain and other vital organs. Compared to infants with clinical chorioamnionitis, it appears cerebral palsy may occur at a higher rate for those with histologic chorioamnionitis. However, more research needs to be done to examine this association. There is also concern about the impact of FIRS on infant immunity as this is a critical time for growth and development. For instance, it may be linked to chronic inflammatory disorders, such as asthma.

== Epidemiology ==
Chorioamnionitis is approximated to occur in about 4% of births in the United States. However, many other factors can increase the risk of chorioamnionitis. For example, in births with premature rupture of membranes (PROM), between 40 and 70% involve chorioamnionitis. Furthermore, clinical chorioamnionitis is implicated in 12% of all cesarean deliveries. Some studies have shown that the risk of chorioamnionitis is higher in those of African American ethnicity, those with immunosuppression, and those who smoke, use alcohol, or abuse drugs.

== See also ==
- Chronic deciduitis
- Funisitis
- Placentitis
- Wharton's jelly
