= GATA2 deficiency =

- Other names: GATA2 haploinsufficiency, GATA2 deficiency syndrome

GATA2 deficiency is a grouping of several disorders caused by common defect, namely, familial or sporadic inactivating mutations in one of the two parental GATA2 genes. Because the gene is haploinsufficient, mutations that cause a reduction in cellular levels of the gene's product, GATA2, are autosomal dominant. The GATA2 protein is a transcription factor critical for the embryonic development, maintenance, and functionality of blood-forming, lymphatic-forming, and other tissue-forming stem cells. In consequence of these mutations, cellular levels of GATA2 are deficient and individuals develop over time hematological, immunological, lymphatic, or other presentations that may begin as apparently benign abnormalities but commonly progress to severe organ (e.g. lung) failure, opportunistic infections, virus infection-induced cancers, the myelodysplastic syndrome, and/or leukemia. GATA2 deficiency is a life-threatening and precancerous condition.

The various presentations of GATA2 deficiency include:

1. Monocytopenia and Mycobacterium Avium Complex/Dendritic Cell, Monocyte, B and NK Lymphocyte deficiency (i.e. MonoMAC or MonoMAC/DCML);
2. Emberger syndrome;
3. Familial myelodysplastic syndrome/acute myeloid leukemia (i.e. familial MDS/AML);
4. Chronic myelomonocytic leukemia (i.e. CMML); and
5. Other anomalies such as aplastic anemia, chronic neutropenia, and wide-ranging immunological defects.

Each of these presentations is characterized by a specific constellation of signs and symptoms but often includes signs and symptoms more characteristic of other GATA2 deficiency presentations. Furthermore, individuals with identical GATA2 gene mutations can exhibit very different presentations.

Prior to 2011, MonoMAC and the Emberger syndrome were clinically defined as unrelated genetic disorders. In 2011, however, all cases of both disorders were found to be caused by inactivating mutations in the GATA2 gene. Subsequently, some but not all cases of an expanding list of other well-defined disorders have been attributed to inactivating GATA2 mutations. While MonoMAC, the Emberger syndrome, and the growing list of all other disorders marked by inactivating GATA2 gene mutations are now being classified as a single clinical entity termed GATA2 deficiency, MonoMAC and the Emberger syndrome are sometimes still regarded as separate clinical entities. Here, GATA2 deficiency is taken to include all disorders caused by inactivating GATA2 mutations. Defined as such, GATA2 deficiency is an unexpectedly common underlying cause for a growing list of disorders. Importantly, however, its treatment differs critically from that used to treat cases of these disorders which are not due to GATA2 deficiency.

== Presentations ==
The presentations of GATA2 deficiency commonly fall into various categories with MonoMAC and Emberger syndrome in the past and sometimes even currently being considered as separate entities. In most cases, the age of onset and initial signs and symptoms are variable with each presentation often being accompanied by signs or symptoms more typical of other presentations. Nonetheless, most cases of the deficiency exhibit a combination of signs and symptoms that fit the following presentations.

=== MonoMAC ===
Individuals affected by MonoMAC commonly present in early adulthood affected by one or more of the opportunistic infections listed in the above Signs and symptoms section and have profoundly low numbers of circulating monocytes which may have existed for many years before symptoms developed. These individuals also have low numbers of two other types of circulating blood cells viz., B lymphocytes and NK cells. Other presentations and/or developments (see Signs and symptoms) include: 1) pulmonary alveolar proteinosis; 2) tumors caused by opportunistic viral infections; 3) autoimmunity disturbances; and 4) the myelodysplastic syndrome, acute myeloblastic leukemia, or chronic myelomonocytic leukemia.

=== Emberger Syndrome ===
Emberger syndrome presents as early as infancy but more typically in childhood or early adulthood with lymphedema of the lower limbs or testes, i.e. hydrocele, and congenital sensorineural hearing loss. Affected individuals may also exhibit one or more of the dysplasias listed in the above "Signs and symptoms" section. These presentations typically occur alongside of or are followed by hematologic abnormalities including but often only after many years or decades seriously life-threatening myelodysplastic syndrome and/or acute myeloid leukemia. Individuals affected by the syndrome may also exhibit increased susceptibility to opportunistic viral infections, particularly in individuals that have Null mutations (i.e. mutations that cause complete lose of a functional gene product) in the GATA2 gene.

=== Familial MDS/AML ===
Familial MDS/AML is an inherited predisposition to develop MDS, i.e. a disorder characterized by the development of a genetically distinct subpopulation (i.e. clone) of bone marrow hematopoietic stem cells, decreased levels of one or more types of circulating blood cells, and an increased risk of progressing to leukemia, particularly AML. GATA2 deficiency commonly presents as MDS in childhood (usually >4 years of age) and adolescent (generally <18 years of age) individuals and as such is the most common germline mutation responsible for familial MDS/AML in this age group. Inactivating GATA2 mutations appear responsible for ~15% in cases of advanced familial MDS (i.e. cases in which hematologic blast cells are ≥2% in blood or ≥2% but ≤20% in bone marrow) and in 4% of cases diagnosed as low-grade familial MDS (i.e. blast cells are <2% in blood or <5% in blood). Individuals exhibiting >20% blast cells in blood or bone marrow are diagnosed as having AML. Thus, GATA2 deficiency may also present as AML that was preceded by MPS. In about 70% of the cases, the inactivating GATA2 mutations found in Familial MDS/AML are associated with advanced disease and exhibit monosomy of their 7 chromosome. GATA2 deficiency-induced familial MDS/AML is often diagnosed in one member of a family that has other members with identical GATA2 gene mutations but either are classified as having another type of GATA2 deficiency presentation or have no signs or symptoms whatsoever of GATA2 deficiency.

=== Congenital neutropenia ===
Congenital neutropenia refers to an assorted group of diseases that share a common set of signs and symptoms, viz., neutropenia, i.e. a low circulating blood neutrophil count, increased susceptibility to infections, various organ dysfunctions, and an extraordinarily high risk of developing leukemia. A small percentage of individuals with familial or sporadic GATA2 deficiency present in their childhood with asymptomatic mild neutropenia but no other discernible hematological abnormalities except perhaps monocytopenia and macrocytosis, i.e. enlarged red blood cells. This presentation often persists for years but commonly progresses to include thrombocytopenia, increases susceptibility to infections due to, e.g. atypical mycobacteria or human papillomavirus, dysfunction of non-hematological organs, MDS, and leukemia (primarily AML and less commonly CMML). It is estimated that by age 30, 60% of these individuals develop leukemia. Some of these individuals have large deletion mutations that span the GATA2 along with nearby genes and exhibit in addition to hematological defects various developmental abnormalities, neurological abnormalities, and/or body dysmorphic disorders.

=== Other presentations ===
GATA2 deficiency has been diagnosed in up to 10% of individuals presenting with aplastic anemia. It is also the most common cause of hereditary bone marrow failure and may present with this disorder. GATA 2 deficiency has been diagnosed in rare cases presenting as humoral immune deficiency due to B cell depletion, severe Epstein–Barr virus infection, or Epstein-Barr associated cancers. In all of these presentations, individuals may have or develop other manifestations of the deficiency and are of particularly high risk for developing AML or CMML.

Rare cases of individuals with GATA2 deficiency may also present with extreme monocytosis (i.e. increases in circulating blood monocytes) or CMML, i.e. monocytosis plus the presence of abnormal (blasts) in the circulation and/or bone marrow. GATA2 deficient individuals who develop CMML often exhibit mutations in one of their ASXL1 genes. Since mutations in this gene are associated with CMML independently of GATA2 mutations, ASXL1 mutations may promote the development of CMML in GATA2 deficiency.

=== Symptoms ===
The age of onset of the GATA2 deficiency is variable with rare individuals showing first signs or symptoms in their infancy and others showing first symptoms or signs at almost any time thereafter including their later years. Rare individuals with inactivating GATA2 mutations may never develop symptoms, i.e. the disorder has a very high but nonetheless incomplete degree of penetrance. This variability can occur between members of the same family who are documented to have the same GATA2 mutation. The many signs and symptoms that are the direct or indirect consequences of GATA2 deficiency organized based on the types of involvement are:

- Hematologic: Aplastic anemia, chronic neutropenia, monocytopenia, monocytosis (rarely), thrombocytopenia (which unlike other hematologic findings is most often due to autoimmunity), bone marrow failure, myelodysplastic syndrome, acute myeloid leukemia, chronic myelomonocytic leukemia, case reports of chronic lymphocytic leukemia and large granular lymphocytic leukemia.
- Lymphatic: lymphedema, i.e. fluid retention and tissue swelling caused by a compromised lymphatic system of the lower extremities (often complicated by deep vein thrombosis and cellulitis), lymphedema in other sites such as the face or testes (i.e. hydrocele).
- Immunologic: Increased susceptibility to infections caused by human papillomavirus, Herpes simplex, Varicella zoster virus, Epstein–Barr virus, cytomegalovirus, Molluscum contagiosum virus, nontuberculous mycobacteria, other bacteria, various aspergillus fungus species, various Candida fungus species, and histoplasma capsulatum;
- Tumors: Increased incidence of human papillomavirus-induced (e.g. Bowenoid papulosis, warts, etc.)) and Epstein-Barr virus-associated (e.g. nasopharynx cancer, T cell non-Hodgkin lymphoma ) benign and malignant tumors.
- Cancers: Increased incidence of metastatic melanoma, cervical carcinoma, Bowen disease of the vulva, spindle cell sarcoma of the liver, head and neck cancers, leiomyosarcoma, pancreas cancer, kidney cancer, and breast cancer.
- Autoimmunity: Erythema nodosum, panniculitis, lupus erythematosus-like reactions, autoimmune thrombocytopenia, chronic arthritis, arthralgias, primary biliary cirrhosis, aggressive multiple sclerosis.
- Lung: Pulmonary alveolar proteinosis (unlike most other cases of pulmonary alveolar proteinosis, the GATA2 deficiency-induced lung disorder is not caused by autoimmunity to or other causes for sharp reductions in granulocyte-macrophage colony stimulating factor); cryptogenic organizing pneumonia-like disease, pulmonary artery hypertension; pulmonary ventilation and diffusion defects as defined by pulmonary function testing that may lead to respiratory failure.
- Neuorlogic: Sensorineural hearing loss mainly for high frequencies.
- Heart: Endocarditis (may reflect GATA2 deficiency in the endocardium and/or impaired overlap with GATA4 function, which is involved in the embryonic development of this organ).
- Thyroid gland: Idiopathic (i.e. unknown cause) hypothyroidism.
- Reproductive: High rate of miscarriage.
- Body dysmorphic disorders: Hypotelorism, epicanthic folds, webbed neck, small palpebral fissures, ptosis, strabismus, urogenital malformations.
- Emotional and behavioral disorders: Autism spectrum disorders, chronic headache.

== Genetics ==
=== GATA2 transcription factor ===
The GATA2 transcription factor contains two zinc finger (i.e. ZnF) motifs. C-ZnF is located toward the protein's C-terminus and is responsible for binding to specific DNA sites. N-ZnF is located toward the proteins N-terminus and is responsible for interacting with various other nuclear proteins that regulate its activity. The transcription factor also contains two transactivation domains and one negative regulatory domain which interact with nuclear proteins to up-regulate and down-regulate, respectively, its activity. In promoting haematopoiesis (i.e. maturation of hematological and immunological cells), GATA2 interacts with other transcription factors (viz., RUNX1, SCL/TAL1, GFI1, GFI1b, MYB, IKZF1, Transcription factor PU.1, LYL1) and cellular receptors (viz., MPL, GPR56).

GATA2 binds to a specific nucleic acid sequence viz., (T/A(GATA)A/G), on the promoter and enhancer sites of its target genes and in doing so either stimulates or suppresses the expression of these target genes. However, there are thousands of sites in human DNA with this nucleotide sequence but, for unknown reasons, GATA2 binds to <1% of these. Furthermore, all members of the GATA transcription factor family bind to this same nucleotide sequence and in doing so may in certain instances serve to interfere with GATA2 binding or even displace the GATA2 that is already bound to these sites. For example, displacement of GATA2 bond to this sequence by the GATA1 transcription factor appears important for the normal development of some types of hematological stem cells. This displacement phenomenon is termed the "GATA switch". In all events, the actions of GATA2 in regulating its target genes is extremely complex and not fully understood.

=== GATA2 gene mutations ===
Inactivating mutations in the GATA2 gene are the primary cause of GATA2 deficiency disorders. This gene is a member of the evolutionarily conserved GATA transcription factor gene family. All vertebrate species tested so far, including humans and mice, express 6 GATA genes, GATA1 through GATA6. The human GATA2 gene is located on the long (or "q") arm of chromosome 3 at position 21.3 (i.e. the 3q21.3 locus). It consists of 8 exons. Two sites, one more toward the 5' end, the second more toward the 3' end of the gene code for two Zinc finger structural motifs, ZF1 and ZF2, respectively, of the GATA2 transcription factor. ZF1 and ZF2 are critical for regulating the ability of GATA2 transcription factor to stimulate its target genes.

The GATA2 gene has at least five separate sites which bind nuclear factors that regulate its expression. One particularly important such site is located in intron 4. This site, termed the 9.5 kb enhancer, is located 9.5 kilobases (i.e. kb) down-stream from the gene's transcript initiation site and is a critically important enhancer of the gene's expression. Regulation of GATA2 expression is highly complex. For example, in hematological stem cells, GATA2 transcription factor itself binds to one of these sites and in doing so is part of functionally important positive feedback autoregulation circuit wherein the transcription factor acts to promote its own production; in a second example of a positive feed back circuit, GATA2 stimulates production of Interleukin 1 beta and CXCL2 which act indirectly to simulate GATA2 expression. In an example of a negative feedback circuit, the GATA2 transcription factor indirectly causes activation of the G protein-coupled receptor, GPR65, which then acts, also indirectly, to repress GATA2 gene expression. In a second example of negative feed-back, GATA2 transcription factor stimulates the expression of the GATA1 transcription factor which in turn can displace GATA2 transcription factor from its gene-stimulating binding sites thereby limiting GATA2's actions (see GATA2 switch in "GATA2 transcription factor" section).

The human GATA2 gene is expressed in hematological bone marrow cells at the stem cell and later progenitor cell stages of their development. Increases and/or decreases in the gene's expression regulate the self-renewal, survival, and progression of these immature cells toward their final mature forms viz., erythrocytess, certain types of lymphocytes (i.e. B cells, NK cells, and T helper cells), monocytes, neutrophils, platelets, plasmacytoid dendritic cells, macrophages and mast cells. The gene is likewise critical for the formation of the lymphatic system, particularly for the development of its valves. The human gene is also expressed in endothelium, some non-hematological stem cells, the central nervous system, and, to lesser extents, prostate, endometrium, and certain cancerous tissues.

Scores of different types of inactivating GATA mutations have been associated with GATA2 deficiency; these include frameshift, point, insertion, splice site and deletion mutations scattered throughout the gene but concentrated in the region encoding the GATA2 transcription factor's ZF1, ZF2, and 9.5 kb sites. Rare cases of GATA2 deficiency involve large mutational deletions that include the 3q21.3 locus plus contiguous adjacent genes; these mutations seem more likely than other types of GATA mutations to cause increased susceptibilities to viral infections, developmental lymphatic disorders, and neurological disturbances.

=== Non-mutational GATA2 deficiency ===
Analyses of individuals with AML have discovered many cases of GATA2 deficiency in which one parental GATA2 gene was not mutated but silenced by hypermethylation of its gene promoter. Further studies are required to define the involvement of this hypermethylation-induced form of GATA2 deficiency in other disorders as well to integrate it into the diagnostic category of GATA2 deficiency.

=== Other genetic abnormalities ===
GATA2 deficiency disorders are variably associated with secondary genetic abnormalities. Monosomy of chromosome 7 (i.e. lose of one of the two chromosomes 7) or deletion of the "q" (i.e. short arm) of one chromosome 7 are the most common abnormal karyotypes (i.e. abnormal chromosome number or appearance) associated with GATA2 deficiency, occurring in ~41% of cases; less common abnormal karyotypes associated with the deficiency include chromosome 8 trisomy (8% of cases) and, rarely, chromosome 21 monosomy. GATA2 deficiency is also associated with somatic mutations in at least three other genes viz., ASXL1, SETBP1, and STAG2. Independently of GATA2 mutations and the development of GATA2 deficiency, ASXL1 mutations are associated with MDS, AML, CMML, chronic lymphocytic leukemia, myeloproliferative neoplasm, and cancers of the breast, cervix, and liver, SETBP1 mutations are associated with atypical MDS, CMML, chronic myelogenous leukemia, and chronic neutrophilic leukemia, and STAG2 mutations are associated with MDS, AML, CMML, chronic myelogenous leukemia, and cancers of the bladder, stomach, colon, rectum, and prostate gland. The roles, if any, of these karyotypes and somatic mutations on the development, types of presentation, and progression of GATA2 deficiency are unclear and require further study.

== Pathophysiology ==
=== Blood defects ===
Deletion of both Gata2 genes in mice is lethal by day 10 of embryogenesis due to a total failure in the formation of mature blood cells. Inactivation of one mouse Gata2 gene is neither lethal nor associated with most of the signs of human GATA2 deficiency; however, these animals do show a ~50% reduction in their hematopoietic stem cells along with a reduced ability to repopulate the bone marrow of mouse recipients. The latter findings, human clinical studies, and experiments on human tissues support the conclusion that in humans both parental GATA2 genes are required for sufficient numbers of hematopoietic stem cells to emerge from the hemogenic endothelium during embryogenesis and for these cells and subsequent progenitor cells to survive, self-renew, and differentiate into mature cells. As GATA2 deficient individuals age, their deficiency in hematopoietic stem cells worsens, probably as a result of factors such as infections or other stresses. In consequence, the signs and symptoms of their disease appear and/or become progressively more severe.

MonoMAC-affected individuals exhibit reduced levels of common lymphoid progenitor cells (i.e. a heterogenous group of precursors to various lymphocyte types) and granulocyte-macrophage progenitor cells (i.e. precursors to granulocytes and monocytes). In mice and presumably humans, GATA2 deficiency also leads to reduced levels of early erythrocyte stem cells. While our understanding of human hematopoiesis is incomplete, it is proposed that these or related progenitor cell reductions causes a progressively worsening depletion of circulating and/or tissue bound B cells, NK cells, T helper cells, monocytes, plasmacytoid dendritic cells, neutrophils, and/or red blood cells. In consequence, GATA2 deficient individuals may exhibit the clinically significant disorders of chronic neutropenia, aplastic anemia, bone marrow failure, or the myelodysplastic syndrome. However, the role of GATA2 deficiency in leading to a leukemias is not understood, particularly since mutations which increase the activity of this transcription factor appear to be associated with the progression of non-familial AML as well as development of the blast crisis in chronic myelogenous leukemia.

=== Immunologic defects ===
The depletion of hematologic cells, particularly dendritic cells, caused by GATA2 deficiency (see previous section) also appears responsible for the development of defective innate and adaptive immune responses. In consequence, these individuals become increasing susceptibility to infectious agents and to cancers caused by infective agents. This defect in mounting immune responses is mostly restricted to new antigenic challenges. That is, secondary immune responses to which individuals had mounted effective primary immune responses before GATA2 deficiency paralyzed their immune system generally remain intact. Immune system deterioration would also appear responsible for the development of the pathological autoimmune reactions which affected individuals may mount against their own tissues.

=== Lymphedema ===
The GATA2 transcription factor contributes to controlling the expression of two genes, PROX1 and FOXC2, which are required for the proper development of the lymphatic system, particularly lymph vessel valves. It is proposed that GATA2 deficiency causes a failure to develop competent valves and/or vessels in the lymphatic system and thereby leads to lymphedema.

=== Hearing loss ===
GATA2 deficiency-induced abnormalities in the lymphatic system are also proposed to be responsible for a failure in generating the perilymphatic space around the inner ear's semicircular canals, which in turn underlies the development of sensorineural hearing loss in GATA2 deficient individuals, particularly those diagnosed with the Emberger syndrome.

=== Other defects ===
The pathophysiology behind the other defects associated with GATA2 deficiency such as hypothyroidism, endocarditis, pulmonary alveolar proteinosis; cryptogenic organizing pneumonia-like disease, pulmonary hypertension, pulmonary ventilator and diffusion defects, miscarriages, etc., is as yet undefined. It is possible that many of these other defects are secondary, i.e. associated with GATA2 deficiency but not a direct result of low cellular levels of the GATA2 transcription factor.

== Diagnosis ==
Individuals with GATA2 deficiency commonly exhibit abnormalities in their circulating blood cells (see above "Hematologic" section of Signs and symptoms) that may precede other signs and symptoms of the disease by years. Their bone marrow typically shows significant reductions in one or more types of blood cell lines (i.e. hypocellularity) with characteristic dysplastic features of increased sizes of cells in the red blood cell line (i.e. macrocytic erythropoiesis), small or enlarged megakaryocytes, abnormalities in the maturation of cells in the granulocyte cell line, fibrosis consisting of reticular fibers, increased numbers of T cells containing numerous large granules in their cytoplasm, and in advanced cases increases in blast cell numbers. The bone marrow in advanced cases may also exhibit increase in cellularity, i.e. hypercellularity. GATA2 deficient individuals often have highly increased blood levels of FMS-like tyrosine kinase 3 ligand However, these as well as other features are diagnostic of a hematologic disorder but not necessarily of GATA2 deficiency. DNA sequencing of the full GATA2 gene coding region including the intron4 enhancer by Sanger sequencing or high-throughput methods along with DNA copy number analysis and karyotyping should establish the presence of GATA2 gene mutations; comparison of detected gene mutations to the list of inactivating GATA2 gene mutations plus the clinical presentation and family history are essentials in making the diagnosis of GATA2 deficiency.

== Treatment ==
The various interventions recommended for GATA2 deficiency fall into three categories: family counseling, prevention of the disease's many complications, and bone marrow transplantation in an effort to restore GATA2-sufficient stem cells. However, due to the uncommonness of, and only recent appreciation for, the disease, standard phase 2 clinical trials to establish the efficacy of a drug(s), and/or non-drug treatment regimens against an appropriate placebo treatment regimen have not been reported.

=== Family counseling ===
Family members of an individual(s) diagnosed with an inactivating GATA2 gene mutation should be told of their chances of having this mutation, advised of the consequences of this mutation, recommended to be tested for the mutation, warned that they are not suitable donors for any GATA2 deficient individual, and offered long term follow up of their mutation.

=== Prevention of complications ===
Recommendations for individuals exhibiting susceptibility to the infectious complications of GATA2 deficiency (e.g. MonoMAC-affected individuals) include: early vaccination for papillomavirus, early vaccination or prophylaxis drug treatment for nontuberculosus mycobacteria, and, perhaps, prophylaxis drug treatment (e.g. Azithromycin) for bacteria. Standard methods are recommended for the prevention of deep vein thrombosis and/or the embolism that occur in lymphedema of the lower extremities and for the blood hypercoagulability state complicating GATA2 insufficiency presentations such as the Emberger syndrome. GATA2 deficient individuals should be routinely monitored by: a) frequent complete blood counts and when indicated bone marrow examinations to detect progression of their disorder to more MDS or leukemia; b) and clinical evaluation of respiratory function and when indicated lung function tests to detect deterioration of lung function; and c) clinical evaluation analyses to determine the infection susceptibility, tumor formation, and the worsening function of other organs.

=== Bone marrow transplantation ===
Many authorities currently recommend GATA2 deficiency be treated by a moderately but not maximally aggressive myeloablative conditioning regimen to remove native bone marrow stem/progenitor cells followed by hematopoietic stem cell transplantation to repopulate the bone marrow with GATA2 sufficient stem cells. The use of this procedure should be anticipatory and occur before the development of a hypercellular bone marrow or a bone marrow or blood populated by an excess of progenitor cells (i.e. blast cells >2% to 5%). These developments are often followed by transformation of the disorder to a leukemia. This regimen should also be performed before the development of severe systemic infections, tumors, or deterioration in lung function. While it takes up to 3.5 years for this regimen to fully re-institute good immune function, it significantly reduces susceptibility to infections and infection-induced tumor formation. The regimen also improves or normalizes lung function in cases of pulmonary alveolar proteinosis and pulmonary artery hypertension and may halt the progression or improve the function of other organs directly injured by GATA2 deficiency.

==== Clinical trials ====
Many reports on the recommended treatment of GATA2 deficiency follow an NIH clinical trial termed "A Pilot and Feasibility Study of Reduced-Intensity Hematopoietic Stem Cell Transplant regimen for Patients With GATA2 Mutations". This trial used a regimen of medication (cyclophosphamide, fludarabine) and total body irradiation conditioning followed by allogenic hematopoietic Stem Cell Transplant on 10 patients. The trial had 8 disease-free survivors and obtained an overall survival 76 months with a range of 18 to 95 months. An NIH intervention study is in the process of recruiting and treating 144 individuals with GATA2 deficiency to determine the success of a treatment regimen consisting of medication (fludarabine, busulfan, cyclophosphamide) and total body irradiation conditioning followed by allogenic hematopoietic stem cell transplantation.

== Prognosis ==
Overall survival in a NIH study using a modest conditioning regimen followed by hematologic stem cell transplantation in GATA2 deficient patients affected by immune deficiencies was 54% at 4 years; GATA2 deficient children transplanted for MDS with monosomy 7 experienced a 5-year survival of 68%.

== History ==
In 2011, all cases of the previously described disorders of Emberger syndrome and MonoMAC as well as some cases of the previously described disorder of familial MDS/AML were discovered to be due to inactivating mutations in the GATA2 gene. Subsequently, numerous studies discovered that a significant percentage of many other well-known hematological, immunological, autoimmune, and infectious diseases were associated with, and apparently due to, inactivating mutations in the GATA2 gene.
