= Emberger syndrome =

- This syndrome is autosomal dominant

The Emberger syndrome is a rare, autosomal dominant, genetic disorder caused by familial or sporadic inactivating mutations in one of the two parental GATA2 genes. The mutation results in a haploinsufficiency (i.e. reduction) in the levels of the gene's product, the GATA2 transcription factor. This transcription factor is critical for the embryonic development, maintenance, and functionality of blood-forming, lymphatic-forming and other tissues. The syndrome includes as its primary symptoms: serious abnormalities of the blood such as the myelodysplastic syndrome and acute myeloid leukemia; lymphedema (i.e. fluid retention and tissue swelling caused by a compromised lymphatic system) of the lower limbs, and sensorineural hearing loss. However, the anomalies caused by GATA2 mutations are highly variable with some individuals showing little or no such symptoms even in old age while others exhibit non-malignant types of hematological anomalies; lymphedema in areas besides the lower limbs, little or no hearing loss; or anomalies in other tissues. The syndrome may present with relatively benign signs and/or symptoms and then progress rapidly or slowly (i.e. over years or decades) to the myelodysplastic syndrome and/or acute myeloid leukemia. Alternatively, it may present with one of the latter two life-threatening disorders.

The Emberger syndrome is only one of the manifestations of inactivating GATA2 mutations. Other manifestations include: 1 Monocytopenia and Mycobacterium Avium Complex/Dendritic Cell, Monocyte, B and NK Lymphocyte deficiency (i.e. MonoMAC or MonoMAC/DCML); 2) familial myelodysplastic syndrome/acute myeloid leukemia (i.e. familial MDS/AML); 3) chronic myelomonocytic leukemia; 4) pediatric myelodysplastic syndrome; and 5) various other hematological abnormalities such as aplastic anemia, anemia, chronic neutropenia; and/or various immunological defects. Individuals with the Emberger syndrome may exhibit signs or symptoms that are more characteristic of the latter manifestations. Since most individuals with inactivating GATA2 mutations progress to a leukemic disorder, the Emberger syndrome is a Precancerous condition.

The age of onset and types of symptoms that occur in individuals afflicted with the Emberger syndrome are highly variable even in family members presumed to have identical GATA2 gene mutations. This variability as well as the variability in the different manifestations of GATA2-inactivating mutations are not fully understood. They likely relate, at least in part, to: individual differences in the: 1) levels of the GATA2 transcription factor which are expressed; 2) genetic backgrounds; 3) occurrence of illnesses or other events that stress the bone marrow; and, possibly, 4) development of other "secondary" genetic abnormalities that often develop during the course of these disorders. Because of these many complexities, recent reports have grouped together all of the different manifestations of GATA2 inactivating mutations into a single pleiotropic genetic disorder termed GATA2 deficiency, GATA2 haploinsufficiency, or the GATA2 deficiency syndrome. Even currently, however, the Emberger syndrome (e.g. its MIM entry is #614038) and MonoMac/DCML (e.g. its MIM entry is #614172) are often classified as distinct clinical disorders. The Emberger syndrome is here considered as a distinct disorder.

== Signs and symptoms ==
The age of onset of the Emberger syndrome is variable with rare individuals showing first symptoms such as lymphedema occurring in early infancy while others are symptomless or develop first symptoms in their middle and latter years. This variability can occur between members of the same family who are documented to have the same GATA2 mutation. The syndrome's most common times of onset are infancy and early childhood. The syndrome may present with unexplained lymphedema, hearing loss, and/or hematological defects like neutropenia, anemia, thrombocytopenia, and/or the circulation of abnormal blood cells. Other defects less commonly associated with and the syndrome include hypotelorism, epicanthic folds, hydrocele, webbed neck, and warts caused be human papillomavirus infection. In these case of relatively benign symptoms and signs, the syndrome commonly progresses rapidly or slowly to myelodysplastic syndrome followed by acute myeloid leukemia. Less commonly, Emberger syndrome presents with the myelodysplastic syndrome and/or acute myeloid leukemia.

== Genetics ==
=== GATA2 gene ===
GATA2 is a member of the evolutionarily conserved GATA transcription factor family of genes:: all tested vertebrates express six GATA genes. The human GATA2 gene is located on the long arm (or "q" arm) of chromosome 3 at position 21.3 (i.e. located at 3q21.3). In humans, it is expressed in hematologic cells at the stem cell and later progenitor cell stages of their development. Increases and/or decreases in the gene's expression regulate the progression of these immature cells toward their final forms as blood cells such as erythrocytes, certain types of lymphocytes, monocytes, and platelets) as well as certain types of tissue cells such as macrophages and mast cells. The GATA2 gene is also expressed in human endothelium, certain types of non-hematological stem cells, and, to lesser extents, prostate, endometrium, and some cancerous tissues.

Monosomy of chromosome 7 (i.e. lose of one of the two chromosomes 7) or deletion of the "q" (i.e. short) in one of these two chromosomes often occurs in the various GATA2 deficiency manifestations including the Emberger syndrome. These genetic abnormalities are known causes of acute myeloid leukemia and, while not essential for, may contribute to the development of acute myeloid leukemia in the syndrome by, for example, lowering the age and/or increasing the chances of the disorder evolving into acute myeloid leukemia.

=== GATA2 transcription factor ===
The GATA2 transcription factor contains two zinc finger (i.e. ZnF) structural motifs. C-ZnF is located toward the protein's C-terminus and is responsible for binding to specific DNA sites. N-ZnF is located toward the proteins N-terminus and is responsible for interacting with various other nuclear proteins that regulate its activity. The transcription factor also contains two transactivation domains and one negative regulatory domain which interact with nuclear proteins to up-regulate and down-regulate, respectively, its activity.

GATA2 binds to a specific nucleic acid sequence viz., (T/A(GATA)A/G) on the promoter and enhancer sites of its target genes and in doing so either stimulates or suppresses these genes' expression. However, there are thousands of sites in human DNA with this nucleotide sequence but, for unknown reasons, GATA2 binds to <1% of these. Furthermore, all members of the GATA transcription factor family bind to this same nucleotide sequence and in doing so may interfere with GATA2 binding or even displace GATA2 already bound to these sites. For example, the displacement of GATA2 bond to this sequence by GATA1 appears important for the normal development of certain hematological stem cells. This phenomenon is termed the "GATA switch". Given these many variables, the GATA2 transcription factor's actions in promoting or inhibiting its target genes is exceedingly complex and not completely understood.

== Pathophysiology ==
The GATA2 transcription factor is critical for the emergence of hematologic stem cells from the hemogenic endothelium during embryogenesis. Deletion of both Gata2 genes in mice is lethal by about day 10 of embryogenesis due to collapse in the formation of mature blood cells. Inactivation of one mouse Gata2 gene is neither lethal nor associated with most of the signs of human GATA2 deficiency except that these animals have ~50% reduction in their hematologic stem cells. The latter findings as well as clinical studies in vitro experiments on human tissues support the notion that both parental GATA2 genes are needed to produce levels of the GATA2 transcription factor sufficient for developing and maintaining normal levels of hematological stem and progenitor cells in humans. The transcription factor's role in performing this function involves complex and incompletely understood interactions with a network of hematopoietic transcription factors including RUNX1, TAL1, MYB, GFI1, FLI1, LYL1, and PU.1. It is not exactly clear how reduced levels of GATA2 cause any of Emberger syndrome's hematological disorders.

The role of GATA2 in promoting the normal development of the lymphatic stem cells may be responsible for the other two key features of the Emberger syndrome. That is, failure to develop competent valves and/or vessels in the lymphatic system, it is proposed, is responsible for the lymphedema of Emberger syndrome while failure to generate the perilymphatic space around the inner ear's semicircular canals, it is proposed, is responsible for the syndrome's sensorineural hearing loss.

== Diagnosis ==
Examination of circulating blood cells, bone marrow cells, and the GATA2 nucleotide sequence of individuals with Emberger syndrome typically evidences abnormalities which are not distinctively different from those of individuals with other manifestations of GATA2 deficiency. The specific diagnosis of Emberger syndrome depends on detecting mutations of the GATA2 gene in a setting of clinical findings of hematological disorders, lymphedema, and neurosensory hearing loss. It may be especially difficult to diagnose the syndrome in the absence of at least one of the latter two clinical signs or in individuals who exhibit anomalies strongly associated with one of the other manifestations of GATA2 deficiency. DNA sequencing of the full GATA2 gene coding region including the intron4 enhancer by Sanger sequencing or high-throughput methods along with DNA copy number analysis should establish the presence of GATA2 gene mutations; comparison of detected gene mutations to the list of inactivating GATA2 gene mutations plus the clinical presentation and family history are essentials in making the diagnosis of the syndrome and its type of presentation.

== Treatment ==
Standard measures are use for the treatment of lymphedema, sensorineural hearing loss, and the other non-malignant anomalies associated with the Emberger syndrome. However, treatment of the disorder's myelodysplastic syndrome and acute myeloid leukemia differs somewhat from standard measures. Like other GATA2 insufficiencies, Emberger syndrome is associated with a deficiency of hematological stem and early progenitor cells that is often due to a hereditary loss of one GATA2 gene. Consequently, the use of radical myeloablative conditioning regimens to remove native bone marrow stem/progenitor cells in preparation for hematopoietic stem cell transplantation may entail excessive morbidity and mortality. While no controlled studies on the treatment of the hematological disorders of the syndrome have been reported, current recommendations by multiple authorities suggest the use of hematopoietic stem cell transplantation using non-myeloablative conditioning methods be used when indicated. The use of this procedure should be anticipatory and occur before the development of an excess of progenitor cells populate the bone marrow in cases of myelodysplasia as well as before the development of acute myeloid leukemia. Accordingly, individuals should be routinely monitored by bone marrow examinations and complete blood counts. Furthermore, the relatives of patients afflicted with the syndrome or any of other manifestations of GATA2 deficiency should be tested for GATA2 mutations. Individuals with such mutations are not candidates for donating their stem cells of Emberger syndrome patients. Reversion of the bone marrow to full immune restitution with improved expression of GATA2 can take up to several years after transplantation.

== Prognosis ==
Prognosis of the Emberger syndrome depends heavily on the speed of its progression to bone marrow failure, myelodysplasia with excessive blast cells, or acute myeloid leukemia. Intervention with non-myeloablative hematopoietic stem cell transplantation before development of the latter two disorders is thought to improve survival indefinitely in most cases. While not yet tested, this transplantation intervention would seem to offer a similar benefit in cases of severe, potentially lethal bone marrow failure.

== History ==
The Emberger syndrome was first described by J.M. Emberger in 1979 as an unusual and not previously described constellation of symptoms (sensorineural hearing loss, lower limb lymphedema, and hematological disorders) in 4 individuals from two generations of a single family. A subsequent study published in 2011 and conducted on three different families found that 8 members of these families with clinically diagnosed Emberger syndrome as well as six sporadic cases of individuals with this clinical diagnosis exhibited one of eight different mutations in one of their two parental GATA2 genes. Each mutation was predicted to reduce the levels of functional GATA2. Thus, reduced levels of functionally competent GATA2 transcription factor resulting from a mutation in one of its genes is responsible for the Emberger syndrome.
