= GATA2 =

Protein found in humans

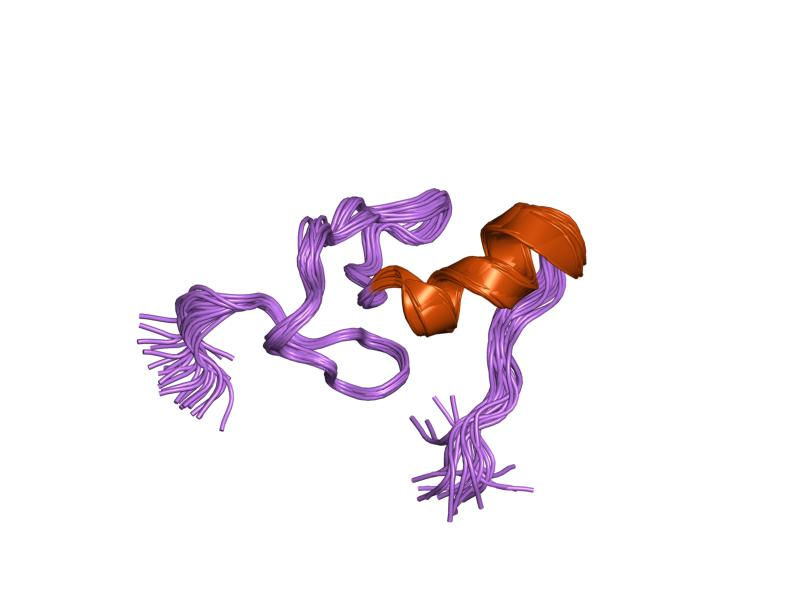

Identifiers
- Aliases: GATA2, DCML, IMD21, MONOMAC, NFE1B, GATA binding protein 2
- External IDs: OMIM: 137295; MGI: 95662; GeneCards: GATA2

Gene location (Human)
Chr.	Chromosome 3 (human)
Band	3q21.3	Start	128,479,427 bp
Band	3q21.3	End	128,493,201 bp

Gene location (Mouse)
Chr.	Chromosome 6 (mouse)
Band	6 D1|6 39.2 cM	Start	88,170,873 bp
Band	6 D1|6 39.2 cM	End	88,184,014 bp
RNA expression pattern
Bgee	Human / Mouse (ortholog); Top expressed in: seminal vesicula; right lung; left uterine tube; renal medulla; prostate; body of uterus; urethra; canal of the cervix; upper lobe of left lung; placenta / Top expressed in: seminal vesicula; gastrula; medullary collecting duct; placenta; transitional epithelium of urinary bladder; vestibular membrane of cochlear duct; vas deferens; vestibular sensory epithelium; primary trophoblast giant cell; inner renal medulla; More reference expression data
BioGPS	n/a
Gene ontology
Molecular function	RNA polymerase II cis-regulatory region sequence-specific DNA binding; DNA binding; sequence-specific DNA binding; RNA polymerase II transcription regulatory region sequence-specific DNA binding; DNA-binding transcription factor activity; DNA-binding transcription activator activity, RNA polymerase II-specific; zinc ion binding; transcription factor binding; chromatin binding; C2H2 zinc finger domain binding; metal ion binding; protein binding; cis-regulatory region sequence-specific DNA binding; DNA-binding transcription factor activity, RNA polymerase II-specific
Cellular component	transcription regulator complex; nucleoplasm; nucleus; cytoplasm; protein-containing complex
Biological process	commitment of neuronal cell to specific neuron type in forebrain; positive regulation of phagocytosis; cell differentiation; negative regulation of fat cell differentiation; pituitary gland development; positive regulation of phagocytosis, engulfment; regulation of transcription, DNA-templated; positive regulation of erythrocyte differentiation; somatic stem cell population maintenance; negative regulation of macrophage differentiation; GABAergic neuron differentiation; positive regulation of cytosolic calcium ion concentration; negative regulation of fat cell proliferation; negative regulation of neural precursor cell proliferation; embryonic placenta development; neuron migration; blood coagulation; negative regulation of transcription by RNA polymerase II; cell maturation; semicircular canal development; transcription, DNA-templated; regulation of primitive erythrocyte differentiation; ventral spinal cord interneuron differentiation; response to lipid; cell differentiation in hindbrain; central nervous system neuron development; inner ear morphogenesis; positive regulation of neuron differentiation; regulation of histone acetylation; neuron differentiation; regulation of forebrain neuron differentiation; phagocytosis; urogenital system development; cell fate determination; homeostasis of number of cells within a tissue; definitive hemopoiesis; neuron fate commitment; negative regulation of myeloid cell differentiation; positive regulation of megakaryocyte differentiation; positive regulation of transcription by RNA polymerase II; negative regulation of Notch signaling pathway; eosinophil fate commitment; positive regulation of mast cell degranulation; cochlea development; regulation of hematopoietic stem cell differentiation; positive regulation of angiogenesis; negative regulation of endothelial cell apoptotic process; positive regulation of gene expression; negative regulation of gene expression; hemopoiesis; pri-miRNA transcription by RNA polymerase II; positive regulation of cell migration involved in sprouting angiogenesis; positive regulation of blood vessel endothelial cell proliferation involved in sprouting angiogenesis; development of the heart; animal organ morphogenesis; tissue development; cell development; anatomical structure formation involved in morphogenesis; positive regulation of pri-miRNA transcription by RNA polymerase II; digestive tract development
Sources:Amigo / QuickGO
Orthologs
Databases	NCBI: entry; OMA: entry
Species	Human	Mouse
Entrez	2624	14461
Ensembl	ENSG00000179348	ENSMUSG00000015053
UniProt	P23769	O09100
RefSeq (mRNA)	NM_032638; NM_001145661; NM_001145662	NM_008090; NM_001355253
RefSeq (protein)	NP_001139133; NP_001139134; NP_116027	NP_032116; NP_001342182
Location (UCSC)	Chr 3: 128.48 – 128.49 Mb	Chr 6: 88.17 – 88.18 Mb
PubMed search
- Wikidata
View/Edit Human	View/Edit Mouse

GATA2 or GATA-binding factor 2 is a transcription factor, i.e. a nuclear protein which regulates the expression of genes. It regulates many genes that are critical for the embryonic development, self-renewal, maintenance, and functionality of blood-forming, lymphatic system-forming, and other tissue-forming stem cells. GATA2 is encoded by the GATA2 gene, a gene which often suffers germline and somatic mutations which lead to a wide range of familial and sporadic diseases, respectively. The gene and its product are targets for the treatment of these diseases.

Inactivating mutations of the GATA2 gene cause a reduction in the cellular levels of GATA2 and the development of a wide range of familial hematological, immunological, lymphatic, and/or other disorders that are grouped together into a common disease termed GATA2 deficiency. Less commonly, these disorders are associated with non-familial (i.e. sporadic or acquired) GATA inactivating mutations. GATA2 deficiency often begins with seemingly benign abnormalities but if untreated progresses to life-threatening opportunistic infections, virus-induced cancers, lung failure, the myelodysplastic syndrome (i.e. MDS), and/or acute myeloid leukemia, principally acute myeloid leukemia (AML), less commonly chronic myelomonocytic leukemia (CMML), and rarely a lymphoid leukemia.

Overexpression of the GATA2 transcription factor that is not due to mutations in the GATA2 gene appears to be a secondary factor that promotes the aggressiveness of non-familial EVI1 positive AML as well as the progression of prostate cancer.

== GATA2 gene ==
The GATA2 gene is a member of the evolutionarily conserved GATA transcription factor gene family. All vertebrate species tested so far, including humans and mice, express 6 GATA genes, GATA1 through GATA6. The human GATA2 gene is located on the long (or "q") arm of chromosome 3 at position 21.3 (i.e. the 3q21.3 locus) and consists of 8 exons. Two sites, termed C-ZnF and N-ZnF, of the gene code for two Zinc finger structural motifs of the GATA2 transcription factor. These sites are critical for regulating the ability of the transcription factor to stimulate its target genes.

The GATA2 gene has at least five separate sites which bind nuclear factors that regulate its expression. One particularly important such site is located in intron 4. This site, termed the 9.5 kb enhancer, is located 9.5 kilobases (i.e. kb) down-stream from the gene's transcript initiation site and is a critically important enhancer of the gene's expression. Regulation of GATA2 expression is highly complex. For example, in hematological stem cells, GATA2 transcription factor itself binds to one of these sites and in doing so is part of functionally important positive feedback autoregulation circuit wherein the transcription factor acts to promote its own production; in a second example of a positive feed back circuit, GATA2 stimulates production of Interleukin 1 beta and CXCL2 which act indirectly to simulate GATA2 expression. In an example of a negative feedback circuit, the GATA2 transcription factor indirectly causes activation of the G protein coupled receptor, GPR65, which then acts, also indirectly, to repress GATA2 gene expression. In a second example of negative feed-back, GATA2 transcription factor stimulates the expression of the GATA1 transcription factor which in turn can displace GATA2 transcription factor from its gene-stimulating binding sites thereby limiting GATA2's actions.

The human GATA2 gene is expressed in hematological bone marrow cells at the stem cell and later progenitor cell stages of their development. Increases and/or decreases in the gene's expression regulate the self-renewal, survival, and progression of these immature cells toward their final mature forms viz., erythrocytes, certain types of lymphocytes (i.e. B cells, NK cells, and T helper cells), monocytes, neutrophils, platelets, plasmacytoid dendritic cells, macrophages and mast cells. The gene is likewise critical for the formation of the lymphatic system, particularly for the development of its valves. The human gene is also expressed in endothelium, some non-hematological stem cells, the central nervous system, and, to lesser extents, prostate, endometrium, and certain cancerous tissues.

The Gata2 gene in mice has a structure similar to its human counterpart, Deletion of both parental Gata2 genes in mice is lethal by day 10 of embryogenesis due to a total failure in the formation of mature blood cells. Inactivation of one mouse Gata2 gene is neither lethal nor associated with most of the signs of human GATA2 deficiency; however, these animals do show a ~50% reduction in their hematopoietic stem cells along with a reduced ability to repopulate the bone marrow of mouse recipients. The latter findings, human clinical studies, and experiments on human tissues support the conclusion that in humans both parental GATA2 genes are required for sufficient numbers of hematopoietic stem cells to emerge from the hemogenic endothelium during embryogenesis and for these cells and subsequent progenitor cells to survive, self-renew, and differentiate into mature cells. As GATA2 deficient individuals age, their deficiency in hematopoietic stem cells worsens, probably as a result of factors such as infections or other stresses. In consequence, the signs and symptoms of their disease appear and/or become progressively more severe. The role of GATA2 deficiency in leading to any of the leukemia types is not understood. Likewise, the role of GATA2 overexpression in non-familial AML as well as development of the blast crisis in chronic myelogenous leukemia and progression of prostate cancer is not understood.

=== Mutations ===
Scores of different types of inactivating GATA mutations have been associated with GATA2 deficiency; these include frameshift, point, insertion, splice site and deletion mutations scattered throughout the gene but concentrated in the region encoding the GATA2 transcription factor's C-ZnF, N-ZnF, and 9.5 kb sites. Rare cases of GATA2 deficiency involve large mutational deletions that include the 3q21.3 locus plus contiguous adjacent genes; these mutations seem more likely than other types of GATA mutations to cause increased susceptibilities to viral infections, developmental lymphatic disorders, and neurological disturbances.

One GATA2 mutation is a gain of function type, i.e. it is associated with an increase in the activity rather than levels of GATA2. This mutation substitutes valine for leucine in the 359 amino acid position (i.e. within the N-ZnF site) of the transcription factor and has been detected in individuals undergoing the blast crisis of chronic myelogenous leukemia.

=== Pathological inhibition ===
Analyses of individuals with AML have discovered many cases of GATA2 deficiency in which one parental GATA2 gene was not mutated but silenced by hypermethylation of its gene promoter. Further studies are required to integrate this hypermethylation-induced form of GATA2 deficiency into the diagnostic category of GATA2 deficiency.

=== Pathological stimulation ===
Non-mutational stimulation of GATA2 expression and consequential aggressiveness in EVI1-positive AML appears due to the ability of EVI1, a transcription factor, to directly stimulate the expression of the GATA2 gene. The reason for the overexpression of GATA2 that begins in the early stages of prostate cancer is unclear but may involve the ability of FOXA1 to act indirect to stimulate the expression of the GATA2 gene.

== GATA2 ==
The full length GATA2 transcription factor is a moderately sized protein consisting of 480 amino acids. Of its two zinc fingers, C-ZnF (located toward the protein's C-terminus) is responsible for binding to specific DNA sites while its N-ZnF (located toward the proteins N-terminus) is responsible for interacting with various other nuclear proteins that regulate its activity. The transcription factor also contains two transactivation domains and one negative regulatory domain which interact with other nuclear proteins to up-regulate and down-regulate, respectively, its activity. In promoting embryonic and/or adult-type haematopoiesis (i.e. maturation of hematological and immunological cells), GATA2 interacts with other transcription factors (viz., RUNX1, SCL/TAL1, GFI1, GFI1b, MYB, IKZF1, Transcription factor PU.1, LYL1) and cellular receptors (viz., MPL, GPR56). In a wide range of tissues, GATA2 similarly interacts with HDAC3, LMO2, POU1F1, POU5F1, PML SPI1, and ZBTB16.

GATA2 binds to a specific nucleic acid sequence viz., (T/A(GATA)A/G), on the promoter and enhancer sites of its target genes and in doing so either stimulates or suppresses the expression of these target genes. However, there are thousands of sites in human DNA with this nucleotide sequence but for unknown reasons GATA2 binds to <1% of these. Furthermore, all members of the GATA transcription factor family bind to this same nucleotide sequence and in doing so may in certain instances serve to interfere with GATA2 binding or even displace the GATA2 that is already bound to these sites. For example, displacement of GATA2 bond to this sequence by the GATA1 transcription factor appears important for the normal development of some types of hematological stem cells. This displacement phenomenon is termed the "GATA switch". In all events, the actions of GATA2, particularly with referenced to its interactions with many other gene-regulating factors, in controlling its target genes is extremely complex and not fully understood.

== GATA2-related disorders ==
=== Inactivating GATA2 mutations ===
Familial and sporadic inactivating mutations in one of the two parental GATA2 genes causes a reduction, i.e. a haploinsufficiency, in the cellular levels of the GATA2 transcription factor. In consequence, individuals commonly develop a disease termed GATA2 deficiency. GATA2 deficiency is a grouping of various clinical presentations in which GATA2 haploinsufficiency results in the development over time of hematological, immunological, lymphatic, and/or other presentations that may begin as apparently benign abnormalities but commonly progress to life-threatening opportunistic infections, virus infection-induced cancers, the myelodysplastic syndrome, and/or leukemias, particularly AML. The various presentations of GATA2 deficiency include all cases of Monocytopenia and Mycobacterium Avium Complex/Dendritic Cell Monocyte, B and NK Lymphocyte deficiency (i.e. MonoMAC) and the Emberger syndrome as well as a significant percentage of cases of familial myelodysplastic syndrome/acute myeloid leukemia, congenital neutropenia, chronic myelomonocytic leukemia, aplastic anemia, and several other presentations.

=== Activating GATA2 mutation ===
The L359V gain of function mutation (see above section on mutation) increases the activity of the GATA2 transcription factor. The mutation occurs during the blast crisis of chronic myelogenous leukemia and is proposed to play a role in the transformation of the chronic and/or accelerated phases of this disease to its blast crisis phase.

=== Repression of GATA2 ===
The repression of GATA2 expression due to methylation of promoter sites in the GATA2 gene rather than a mutation in this gene has been suggested to be an alternate cause for the GATA2 deficiency syndrome. This epigenetic gene silencing also occurs in certain types of non-small-cell lung carcinoma and is suggested to have a protective effect on progression of the disease.

=== Overexpression of GATA2 ===
Elevated levels of GATA2 transcription factor due to overexpression of its gene GATA2 is a common finding in AML. It is associated with a poor prognosis, appears to promote progression of the disease, and therefore proposed to be a target for therapeutic intervention. This overexpression is not due to mutation but rather caused at least in part by the overexpression of EVI1, a transcription factor that stimulates GATA2 expression. GATA2 overexpression also occurs in prostate cancer where it appears to increase metastasis in the early stages of androgen-dependent disease and to stimulate prostate cancer cell survival and proliferation through activating by an unknown mechanism the androgen pathway in androgen-independent (i.e. castration-resistant) disease).

== See also ==
- GATA transcription factor
- GATA2 deficiency
- MonoMAC
- Emberger syndrome
