= Endothelial stem cell =

Stem cell in bone marrow that gives rise to endothelial cells

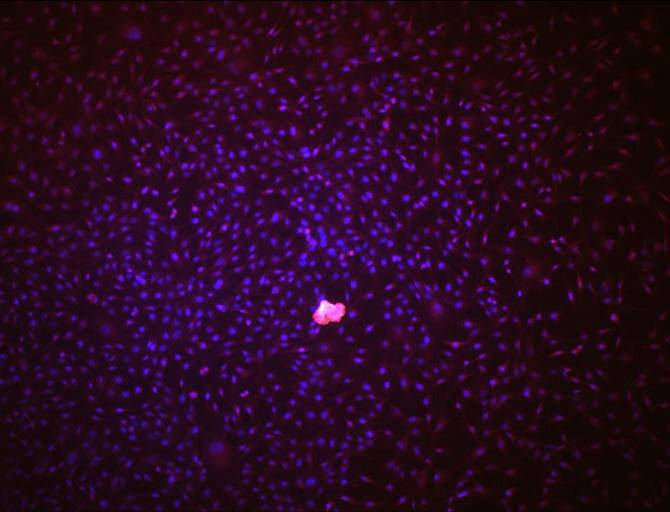
- CD34+ endothelial cell among a population of bovine aortic endothelial cells

Details
- Location: Bone marrow

Identifiers
- Latin: cellula endothelialis praecursoria
- TH: H2.00.01.0.00003

Endothelial stem cells (ESCs) are one of three types of stem cells found in bone marrow. They are multipotent, which describes the ability to give rise to many cell types, whereas a pluripotent stem cell can give rise to all types. ESCs have the characteristic properties of a stem cell: self-renewal and differentiation. These parent stem cells, ESCs, give rise to progenitor cells, which are intermediate stem cells that lose potency. Progenitor stem cells are committed to differentiating along a particular cell developmental pathway. ESCs will eventually produce endothelial cells (ECs), which create the thin-walled endothelium that lines the inner surface of blood vessels and lymphatic vessels. The blood vessels include arteries and veins. Endothelial cells can be found throughout the whole vascular system and they also play a vital role in the movement of white blood cells

== Development ==
ECs were first thought to arise from extraembryonic tissues because blood vessels were observed in the avian and mammalian embryos. However, after histological analysis, it was seen that ECs were found just in the embryo. This meant that blood vessels come from an intraembryonic source, the mesoderm. Since these cells come from the mesoderm, it can become a wide variety of different things found in many different parts of the body.

=== Role of insulin-like growth factors in endothelium differentiation ===
ECs derived from stem cells are the beginning of vasculogenesis. Vasculogenesis is new production of a vascular network from mesodermal progenitor cells. This can be distinguished from angiogenesis, which is the creation of new capillaries from vessels that already exist through the process of splitting or sprouting. This can occur "in vitro" in embryoid bodies (EB) derived from embryonic stem cells; this process in EB is similar to "in vivo" vasculogenesis. Important signaling factors for vasculogenesis are TGF-β, BMP4, and VEGF, all of which promote pluripotent stem cells to differentiate into mesoderm, endothelial progenitor cells, and then into mature endothelium. It is important to talk more about vasculogenesis because this is what makes ECs different from other types of cells that are found in the body. During vasculogenesis, the heart and vascular plexus form while the organism is still an embryo, compared to angiogenesis which is essentially the extension of this. Another difference major difference between the two formation processes is that vasculogenesis originates from hemangioblasts, which come from the mesoderm. There is also differences that occur in the signaling pathways of these two pathways that makes them noticeably different.

It is well established that insulin-like growth factor (IGF) signaling is important for cell responses such as mitogenesis, cell growth, proliferation, angiogenesis, and differentiation. IGF1 and IGF2 increase the production of ECs in EB. A method that IGF employs to increase vasculogenesis is upregulation of VEGF. Not only is VEGF critical for mesoderm cells to become an EC, but also for EPCs to differentiate into mature endothelium. Understanding this process can lead to further research in vascular regeneration.

== Function ==
=== Self-renewal and differentiation ===
Stem cells have the unique ability make identical copies of themselves. This property maintains unspecialized and undifferentiated cells within the body. Differentiation is the process by which a cell becomes more specialized. For stem cells, this usually occurs through several stages, when a cell proliferates giving rise to daughter cells that are further specialized. For example, an endothelial progenitor cell (EPC) is more specialized than an ESC, and an EC is more specialized than an EPC. The further specialized a cell is, the more differentiated it is and as a result it is considered to be more committed to a certain cellular lineage. Stem cell self-renewal is an extremely important process that is a way for organisms to replace the cells that are no longer working properly. Self-renewal is essential to keep the organism functioning properly and efficiently. The process of self-renewal occurs because of the signals the cells receive from the environment and the things the cell expresses to the environment (Fuchs & Chen 2013) . The signals and receptors must function properly at all times so the cells will know what they are supposed to do (Fuchs & Chen 2013). As stated before, proper functioning of the self-renewal system is essential for the organism to live a long healthy life.

=== Blood vessel formation ===
Blood vessels are made of a thin layer of ECs. As part of the circulatory system, blood vessels play a critical role in transporting blood throughout the body. Consequently, ECs have unique functions such as fluid filtration, homeostasis and hormone trafficking. ECs are the most differentiated form of an ESC. Formation of new blood vessels occurs by two different processes: vasculogenesis and angiogenesis. When vasculogenesis occurs the cells transform into different versions throughout the process to eventually become the earliest blood vessels. The cells going through stages from one form to another form is one of the major differences between vasculogenesis and angiogenesis. The angiogenesis process forms new blood vessels form blood vessels that have already been through vasculogenesis. The former requires differentiation of endothelial cells from hemangioblasts and then the further organization into a primary capillary network. The latter occurs when new vessels are built from preexisting blood vessels.

=== Markers ===
The vascular system is made up of two parts: 1) Blood vasculature 2) Lymphatic vessels

Both parts consist of ECs that show differential expression of various genes. A study showed that ectopic expression of Prox-1 in blood vascular ECs (BECs) induced one-third of LEC specific gene expression. Prox-1is a homeobox transcription factor found in lymphatic ECs (LECs). For example, specific mRNAs such as VEGFR-3 and p57Kip2 were expressed by the BEC that was induced to express Prox-1.

Lymphatic-specific vascular endothelial growth factors VEGF-C and VEGF-D function as ligands for the vascular endothelial growth factor receptor 3 (VEGFR-3). The ligand-receptor interaction is essential for normal development of lymphatic tissues.

Tal1 gene is specifically found in the vascular endothelium and developing brain.[5] This gene encodes the basic helix-loop-helix structure and functions as a transcription factor. Embryos lacking Tal1 fail to develop past embryonic day 9.5. However, the study found that Tal1 is actually required for vascular remodeling of the capillary network, rather than early endothelial development itself.

Fetal liver kinase-1 (Flk-1) is a cell surface receptor protein that is commonly used as a marker for ESCs and EPCs.

CD34 is another marker that can be found on the surface of ESCs and EPCs. It is characteristic of hematopoietic stem cells, as well as muscle stem cells.

=== Role in formation of vascular system ===
The two lineages arising from the EPC and the hematopoietic progenitor cell (HPC) form the blood circulatory system. Hematopoietic stem cells can undergo self-renewal, and are multipotent cells that give rise to erythrocytes (red blood cells), megakaryocytes/platelets, mast cells, T-lymphocytes, B-lymphocytes, dendritic cells, natural killer cells, monocyte/macrophage, and granulocytes. A study found that in the beginning stages of mouse embryogenesis, commencing at embryonic day 7.5, HPCs are produced close to the emerging vascular system. In the yolk sac's blood islands, HPCs and EC lineages emerge from the extraembryonic mesoderm in near unison. This creates a formation in which early erythrocytes are enveloped by angioblasts, and together they give rise to mature ECs. This observation gave rise to the hypothesis that the two lineages come from the same precursor, termed hemangioblast. Even though there is evidence that corroborates a hemangioblast, the isolation and exact location in the embryo has been difficult to pinpoint. Some researchers have found that cells with hemangioblast properties have been located in the posterior end of the primitive streak during gastrulation.

In 1917, Florence Sabin first observed that blood vessels and red blood cells in the yolk sac of chick embryos occur in close proximity and time. Then, in 1932, Murray detected the same event and created the term "hemangioblast" for what Sabin had seen.

It is important that these hematopoietic stem cells are able to undergo self-renewal because the human body needs billions of new hematopoietic cells each and every day. If the cells were not able to do this, humans would not be able to survive. There was an experiment that was done involving quail embryos on chicken yolk sacs that found complete opposite results of the experiment done by Sabin. In this experiment, it was found that yolk-sac progenitors only contributed on a small amount to hematopoiesis compared to the embryo. This experiment also showed that blood cells that were made by the yolk sac were not present when the bird hatched. Over time there have been experiments done that add to the confusion if the blood cells and red blood cells are related in the yolk sac and embryo.

Further evidence to corroborate hemangioblasts come from the expression of various genes such as CD34 and Tie2 by both lineages. The fact that this expression was seen in both EC and HPC lineages led researchers to propose a common origin. However, endothelial markers like Flk1/VEGFR-2 are exclusive to ECs but stop HPCs from progressing into an EC. It is accepted that VEGFR-2+ cells are a common precursor for HPCs and ECs. If the Vegfr3 gene is deleted then both HPC and EC differentiation comes to a halt in embryos. VEGF promotes angioblast differentiation; whereas, VEGFR-1 stops the hemangioblast from becoming an EC. In addition, basic fibroblast growth factor FGF-2 is also involved in promoting angioblasts from the mesoderm. After angioblasts commit to becoming an EC, the angioblasts gather and rearrange to assemble in a tube similar to a capillary. Angioblasts can travel during the formation of the circulatory system to configure the branches to allow for directional blood flow. Pericytes and smooth muscle cells encircle ECs when they are differentiating into arterial or venous arrangements. Surrounding the ECs creates a brace to help stabilize the vessels known as the pericellular basal lamina. It is suggested pericytes and smooth muscle cells come from neural crest cells and the surrounding mesenchyme.

=== Role in recovery ===
ESCs and EPCs eventually differentiate into ECs. The endothelium secretes soluble factors to regulate vasodilatation and to preserve homeostasis. When there is any dysfunction in the endothelium, the body aims to repair the damage. Resident ESCs can generate mature ECs that replace the damaged ones. However, the intermediate progenitor cell cannot always generate functional ECs. This is because some of the differentiated cells may just have angiogenic properties. The employs many different protective mechanisms when there is endothelium dysfunction that occurs. The reason so many mechanisms are employed is so that the body is protected the best it can, and will be able to respond to any type of pathogen that should happen to invade the body during this dysfunction.

Studies have shown that when vascular trauma occurs, EPCs and circulating endothelial progenitors (CEPs) are attracted to the site due to the release of specific chemokines. CEPs are derived from EPCs within the bone marrow, and the bone marrow is a reservoir of stem and progenitor cells. These cell types accelerate the healing process and prevent further complications such as hypoxia by gathering the cellular materials to reconstruct the endothelium.

Endothelium dysfunction is a prototypical characteristic of vascular disease, which is common in patients with autoimmune diseases such as systemic lupus erythematosus. Further, there is an inverse relationship between age and levels of EPCs. Inverse of endothelial dysfunction also occurs when other risk factors are treated. With a decline in EPCs the body loses its ability to repair the endothelium.

The use of stem cells for treatment has become a growing interest in the scientific community. Distinguishing between an ESC and its intermediate progenitor is nearly impossible, so research is now being done broadly on EPCs. One study showed that brief exposure to sevoflurane promoted growth and proliferation of EPCs. Sevoflurane is used in general anesthesia, but this finding shows the potential to induce endothelial progenitors. Using stem cells for cell replacement therapies is known as "regenerative medicine", which is a booming field that is now working on transplanting cells as opposed to bigger tissues or organs. There was another study done that also showed that after exposure to sevoflurane, the EPCs were able to adhere to endothelial cells better. When combining the results from both of the studies, results show that sevoflurane was able to improve the function of EPCs significantly in three different areas of interest.

== Clinical significance ==
=== Role in cancer ===
Understanding more about ESCs is important in cancer research. Tumours induce angiogenesis, which is the formation of new blood vessels. These cancerous cells do this by secreting factors such as VEGF and by reducing the amount of PGK, an anti-VEGF enzyme. The result is an uncontrolled production of beta-catenin, which regulates cell growth and cell mobility. With uncontrolled beta-catenin, the cell loses its adhesive properties. As ECs get packed together to create the lining of a new blood vessel, a single cancer cell is able to travel through the vessel to a distant site. If that cancer cell implants itself and begins forming a new tumor, the cancer has metastasized. The cancer cells also do not have to travel to a distant site, they can also stay in one location and this is known as the tumor being benign. Metastasized tumors are much harsher form of cancer because the tumors must be treated at many different locations, compared to just one location when the tumor is benign.

== Research ==
Stem cells have always been a huge interest for scientists due to their unique properties that make them unlike any other cell in the body. Generally, the idea boils down to harnessing the power of plasticity and the ability to go from an unspecialized cell to a highly specialized differentiated cell. ESCs play an incredibly important role in establishing the vascular network that is vital for a functional circulatory system. Consequently, EPCs are under study to determine the potential for treatment of ischemic heart disease. Scientists are still trying to find a way to definitely distinguish the stem cell from the progenitor. In the case of endothelial cells, it is even difficult to distinguish a mature EC from an EPC. However, because of the multipotency of the ESC, the discoveries made about EPCs will parallel or understate the powers of the ESC.

=== Animal models ===
There are a number of models used to study vasculogenesis. Avian embryos, Xenopus laevis embryos, are both fair models. However, zebrafish and mouse embryos have widespread use for easily observed development of vascular systems, and the recognition of key parts of molecular regulation when ECs differentiate.

== See also ==
- endometrial regenerative cells, also known as endometrial stem cells, derived from mammalian uterus lining.
- List of human cell types derived from the germ layers
