= Vascular remodelling in the embryo =

Biological process

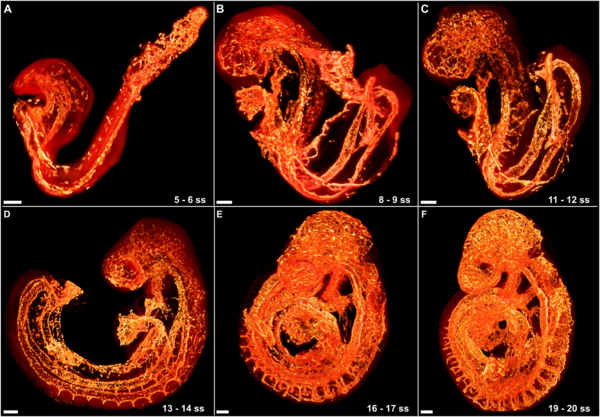
(A and B) The vascular system at 5 somite forms as loose, disconnected network. (C) At the initiation of blood flow (approximately 10 somite) the vasculature begins to be remodelled into a more efficient network. (D - F) Progressive stages of vascular remodelling, culminating in the stereotypical circulatory system seen in (F).

Vascular remodelling is a process which occurs when an immature heart begins contracting, pushing fluid through the early vasculature. The process typically begins at day 22, and continues to the tenth week of human embryogenesis. This first passage of fluid initiates a signal cascade and cell movement based on physical cues including shear stress and circumferential stress, which is necessary for the remodelling of the vascular network, arterial-venous identity, angiogenesis, and the regulation of genes through mechanotransduction. This embryonic process is necessary for the future stability of the mature vascular network.

Vasculogenesis is the initial establishment of the components of the blood vessel network, or vascular tree. This is dictated by genetic factors and has no inherent function other than to lay down the preliminary outline of the circulatory system. Once fluid flow begins, biomechanical and hemodynamic inputs are applied to the system set up by vasculogenesis, and the active remodelling process can begin.

Physical cues such as pressure, velocity, flow patterns, and shear stress are known to act on the vascular network in a number of ways, including branching morphogenesis, enlargement of vessels in high-flow areas, angiogenesis, and the development of vein valves. The mechanotransduction of these physical cues to endothelial and smooth muscle cells in the vascular wall can also trigger the promotion or repression of certain genes which are responsible for vasodilation, cell alignment, and other shear stress-mitigating factors. This relationship between genetics and environment is not clearly understood, but researchers are attempting to clarify it by combining reliable genetic techniques, such as genetically ablated model organisms and tissues, with new technologies developed to measure and track flow patterns, velocity profiles, and pressure fluctuations in vivo.

Both in vivo study and modelling are necessary tools to understand this complex process. Vascular remodelling is pertinent to wound healing and proper integration of tissue grafting and organ donations. Promoting an active remodelling process in some cases could help patients recover faster and retain functional use of donated tissues. However, outside of wound healing, chronic vascular remodelling in the adult is often symptomatic of cardiovascular disease. Thus, increased understanding of this biomedical phenomenon could aid in the development of therapeutics or preventative measures to combat diseases such as atherosclerosis.

== Historical view ==
Over 100 years ago, Thoma observed that increases in local blood flow cause widening of the vessel diameter and he even went so far as to postulate that blood flow might be responsible for the growth and development of blood vessels. Subsequently, Chapman in 1918 discovered that removing a chick embryo's heart disrupted the remodelling process, but the initial vessel patterns laid down by vasculogenesis remained undisturbed. Next, in 1926 Murray proposed that vessel diameter was proportional to the amount of shear stress at the vessel wall; that is, that vessels actively adapted to flow patterns based on physical cues from the environment, such as shear stress.

The chemical basis of morphogenesis," written in 1952 by mathematician and computer scientist Alan Turing advocated for various biological models based on molecular diffusion of nutrients. However, a diffusive model of vascular development would seem to fall short of the complexity of capillary beds and the interwoven network of arteries and veins. In 2000, Fleury proposed that instead of diffusive molecules bearing responsibility for the branching morphogenesis of the vascular tree, a long-range morphogen may be implicated. In this model, a traveling pressure wave would act upon the vasculature via shear stress to rearrange branches into the lowest-energy configuration by widening vessels carrying increased blood flow and rearranging networks upon the initiation of fluid flow. It is known that mechanical forces can have a dramatic impact on the morphology and complexity of the vascular tree. However, these forces have comparably little impact on the diffusion of nutrients, and it therefore seems unlikely that acquisition of nutrients and oxygen plays a significant role in embryonic vascular remodelling.

It is now widely accepted that vascular remodelling in the embryo is a process distinct from vasculogenesis; however these two processes are inextricably linked. Vasculogenesis occurs prior to vascular remodelling, but is a necessary step in the development of the blood vessel network and has implications on the identification of vessels as either arterial or venous. Once contraction of the heart begins, vascular remodelling progresses via the interplay of forces resulting from biomechanical cues and fluid dynamics, which are translated by mechanotransduction to changes at cellular and genetic levels.

== Vasculogenesis ==
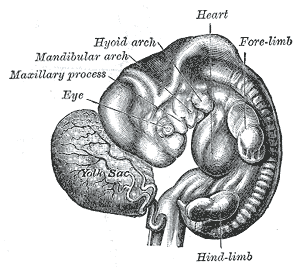
Human embryo at approximately 30 days, showing development of various structures including the yolk sac. From Gray's anatomy.

Vasculogenesis is the formation of early vasculature, which is laid down by genetic factors. Structures called blood islands form in the mesoderm layer of the yolk sac by cellular differentiation of hemangioblasts into endothelial and red blood cells. Next, the capillary plexus forms as endothelial cells migrate outward from blood islands and form a random network of continuous strands. These strands then undergo a process called lumenization, the spontaneous rearrangement of endothelial cells from a solid cord into a hollow tube.

Inside the embryo, the dorsal aorta forms and eventually connect the heart to the capillary plexus of the yolk sac. This forms a closed-loop system of rigid endothelial tubing. Even this early in the process of vasculogenesis, before the onset of blood flow, sections of the tube system may express ephrins or neuropilins, genetic markers of arterial or venous identities, respectively. These identities are still somewhat flexible, but the initial characterization is important to the embryonic remodelling process.

Angiogenesis also contributes to the complexity of the initial network; spouting endothelial buds form by an extrusion-like process which is prompted by the expression of vascular endothelial growth factor (VEGF). These endothelial buds grow away from the parent vessel to form smaller, daughter vessels reaching into new territory. Intussusception, the phenomenon of a single tube splitting to form two branching tubes, also contributes to angiogenesis. Angiogenesis is generally responsible for colonizing individual organ systems with blood vessels, whereas vasculogenesis lays down the initial pipelines of the network. Angiogenesis is also known to occur during vascular remodelling.

== Arterial-venous identity ==
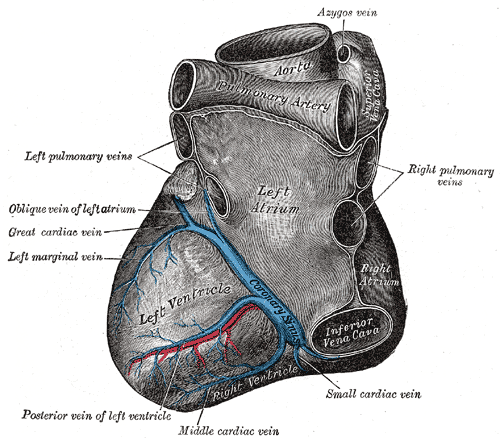
In this anatomical image from Gray's Anatomy, it can be seen that the cardiac vein develops in close proximity to the arterial network, and in early embryos, sections may switch identities from arterial to venous vessels.

The classification of angioblasts into arterial- or venous-identified cells is essential to form the proper branching morphology. Arterial segments of the early vasculature express ephrinB2 and DLL4 whereas venous segments express neuropilin-2 and EPHB4; this is believed to assist in guidance of flow from arterial-venous sections of the loop. However, mechanical cues provided by the heart's first contractions are still necessary for complete remodelling.

The first event of biomechanical-driven hierarchal remodelling occurs just after the onset of heart beat, when the vitelline artery forms by the fusion of several smaller capillaries. Subsequently, side branches may disconnect from the main artery and reattach to the venous network, effectively changing their identity. This is thought to be due to the high luminal pressure in the arterial lines, which prevents reattachment of the branches back onto arterial vessels. This also prevents the formation of shunts between the two components of the network. Moyon et al. showed that arterial endothelial cells could become venous and vice versa. They grafted sections of quail endothelial tubing which had previously expressed arterial markers onto chick veins (or vice versa), showcasing the plasticity of the system. Reversing flow patterns in arteries and/or veins can also have the same effect, although it is unclear whether this is due to differences in physical or chemical properties of venous vs. arterial flow (i.e. pressure profile and oxygen tension).

Another example of the fluidity of arterial-venous identity is that of the intersomitic vessel. At early stages, this vessel is connected to the aorta, making it part of the arterial network. However, sprouts from the cardiac vein may fuse with the intersomitic vessel, which slowly disconnects from the aorta and becomes a vein. This process is not fully understood, but may occur out of a need to balance mechanical forces such as pressure and perfusion.

Arterial-venous identity in the early stages of embryonic vascular remodelling is flexible, with arterial segments often being recycled to venous lines and the physical structure and genetic markers of segments being actively remodelled along with the network itself. This indicates that the system as a whole exhibits a degree of plasticity which allows it to be shaped by transitory flow patterns and hemodynamic signals, however genetic factors do play a role in the initial specification of vessel identity.

== Biomechanics ==
Once the heart begins to beat, mechanical forces start acting upon the early vascular system, which rapidly expands and reorganizes to serve tissue metabolism. In embryos devoid of blood flow, endothelial cells retain an undifferentiated morphology similar to angioblasts (compared to flattened epithelial cells found in mature vasculature). Once the heart begins beating, the morphology and behaviour of endothelial cells change. By changing the heart rate, the heart can also control perfusion or pressure acting upon the system in order to trigger sprouting of new vessels. In turn, new vessel sprouting is balanced by the expansion of other embryo tissues, which compress blood vessels as they grow. The equilibrium of these forces plays a major role in vascular remodelling, but although the angiogenic mechanisms required to trigger the sprouting of new vessels have been studied, little is known about the remodelling processes required to curb the growth of unnecessary branches.

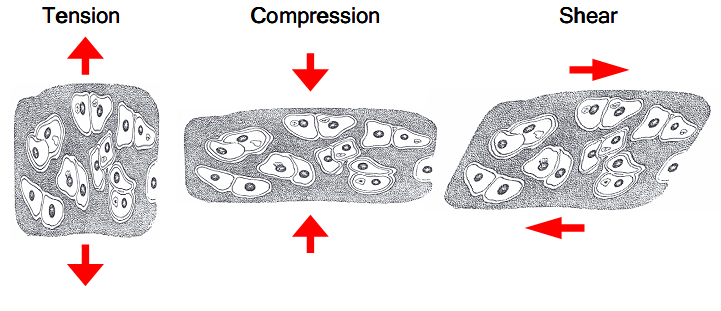
Examples of biomechanical forces acting on connective tissue. From Gray's Anatomy.

As blood perfuses the system, it exerts shear and pressure forces on the vessel walls. At the same time, tissue growth outside the cardiovascular system pushes back on the outside of the vessel walls. These forces must be balanced to obtain an efficient energy state for low-cost delivery of nutrients and oxygen to all tissues of the embryo body. When growth of the yolk sac (external tissue) is constrained, the balance between vascular forces and tissue forces is shifted and some vascular branches may be disconnected or diminished during the remodelling process because they are unable to forge new paths through the compressed tissue. In general, the stiffness and resistance of these tissues dictates the degree to which they can be deformed and the way in which biomechanical forces can affect them.

The development of the vascular network is self-organized at each point in the tissue due to the balance between compressive forces of tissue expansion and circumferential stretch of the vessel walls. Over time, this means that migrating lines become straight rather than curving; this is akin to imagining two moving boundaries pushing on each other. Straight vessels are usually parallel to isopressure lines because the boundaries have acted to equilibriate pressure gradients. In addition, vessel direction tends to follow the direction of the normal to the steepest stress gradient.

Additionally, biomechanic forces inside embryonic vessels have important remodelling effects. Pressure fluctuations lead to stress and strain fluctuations, which can "train" the vessels to bear loads later in the organism's development. The fusion of several small vessels can also generate large vessels in areas of the vascular tree where blood pressure and flow rate are larger. Murray's law is a relation between the radius of parent vessels to the radius of branches which holds true for the circulatory system. This outlines the balance between the lowest resistance to flow presented by vessel size (because large-diameter vessels exhibit a low pressure drop) and the maintenance of the blood itself as a living tissue which cannot diffuse ad infinitum. Therefore, complex branching is required to supply blood to organ systems, as diffusion alone cannot be responsible for this.

Biomechanics act on the vascular network connections as well. Luminal pressure has been shown to direct the recycling of vessel segments to high-pressure areas, and govern the disconnection of vessel segments from arterial lines and reattachment to venous lines in order to shape the network. This type of vessel breakage may even be indirectly responsible for the development of some organ systems and the evolution of larger organisms, as without detachment and migration, large masses of tissue in the embryo would remain disconnected from the blood supply. Once vessels break away from the parent artery, they may also undergo angiogenesis to infest tissues distal to the rest of the network.

== Fluid dynamics ==
Representation of laminar flow between two walls. The pressure gradient at the fluid boundary layer (green) is transmitted to the walls by shear stress.

Fluid dynamics also plays an important role in vascular remodelling. The shear stress applied to vessel walls is proportional to the viscosity and flow patterns of the fluid. Disturbed flow patterns can promote the formation of valves and increasing pressure can affect the radial growth of vessels. The primitive heart within the first few days of contraction is best described as a peristaltic pump, however after three days the flow becomes pulsatile. Pulsatile flow plays an important role in vascular remodelling, as flow patterns can affect the mechanotransduction of stress to endothelial cells.

Dimensionless relations such as the Reynolds number and Womersley number can be used to describe flow in early vasculature. The low Reynolds number present in all early vessels means that flow can be considered creeping and laminar. A low Womersley number means that viscous effects dominate flow structure and that boundary layers can be considered to be non-existent. This allows the fluid dynamic computations to rest upon certain assumptions which simplify the mathematics.

During the first stages of embryonic vascular remodelling, high-velocity flow is not present solely in large-diameter vessels, but this corrects itself due to the effects of vascular remodelling over the first two days of blood flow. It is known that embryonic vessels respond to increases in pressure by increasing the diameter of the vessel. Due to the absence of smooth muscle cells and the glycocalyx, which provide elastic support in adult vessels, blood vessels in the developing embryo are much more resistant to flow. This means that increases in flow or pressure can only be answered by rapid, semi-permanent expansion of the vessel diameter, rather than by more gradual stretch and expansion experienced in adult blood vessels.

Rearranging the Laplace and Poiseuille relations suggests that radial growth occurs as a result of circumferential stretch and circumferential growth occurs as a result of shear stress. Shear stress is proportional to the speed inside the vessel as well as the pressure drop between two fixed points on the vessel wall. The precise mechanism of vessel remodelling is believed to be high stress on the inner wall of the vessel which can induce growth, which heads toward uniform compressive and tensile stress on both sides of the vessel wall. Generally, it has been found that circumferential residual stress is compressive and tensile, indicating that inner layers of the endothelial tube grow more than outer layers.

== Mechanotransduction and genetic regulation ==
A feedback model of genetic regulation. In this case the input is a physical force and the feedback can be positive or negative depending on the value of B.

The mechanism by which different types of flow patterns and other physical cues have different effects on vascular remodelling in the embryo is called mechanotransduction. Turbulent flow, which is commonplace in the developing vasculature, plays a role in the formation of cardiac valves which prevent backflows associated with turbulence. It has also been shown that heterogeneous flow patterns in large vessels can create asymmetry, perhaps by preferentially activating genes such as PITX2 on one side of the vessel, or perhaps by inducing circumferential stretch on one side, promoting regression on the other side. Laminar flow also has genetic effects, such as reducing apoptosis, inhibiting proliferation, aligning cells in direction of flow, and regulating many cell signalling factors. Mechanotransduction may act either by positive or negative feedback loops, which may activate or repress certain genes to respond to the physical stress or strain placed on the vessel.

The cell "reads" flow patterns through integrin sensing, receptors which provide a mechanical link between the extracellular matrix and the actin cytoskeleton. This mechanism dictates how a cell will respond to flow patterns and can mediate cell adhesion, which is especially relevant to the sprouting of new vessels. Through the process of mechanotransduction, shear stress can regulate the expression of many different genes. The following examples have been studied in the context of vascular remodelling by biomechanics:

- Endothelial nitric oxide synthase (eNOS), promotes unidirectional flow at the onset of heart beats and is upregulated by shear stress
- Platelet-derived growth factor (PDGF), transforming growth factor beta (TGFβ), and Kruppel-like factor 2 (Klf-2) are induced by shear stress and may have up-regulating effects on genes which deal with endothelial response to turbulent flow
- Shear stress induces phosphorylation of VEGF receptors, which are responsible for vascular development, especially the sprouting of new vessels
- Hypoxia can trigger the expression of hypoxia inducible factor 1 (HIF-1) or VEGF in order to pioneer the growth of new sprouts into oxygen-deprived areas of the embryo
- PDGF-β, VEGFR-2, and connexion43 are upregulated by abnormal flow patterns
- Shear stress upregulates NF-κB, which induces matrix metalloproteinases to trigger the enlargement of blood vessels

Different flow patterns and their duration can elicit very different responses based on the shear-stress-regulated genes. Both genetic regulation and physical forces are responsible for the process of embryonic vascular remodelling, yet these factors are rarely studied in tandem.,

== In vivo study ==
The main difficulty in the in vivo study of embryonic vascular remodelling has been to separate the effects of physical cues from the delivery of nutrients, oxygen, and other signalling factors which may have an effect on vascular remodelling. Previous work has involved control of blood viscosity in early cardiovascular flow, such as preventing the entry of red blood cells into blood plasma, thereby lowering viscosity and associated shear stresses. Starch can also be injected into the blood stream in order to increase viscosity and shear stress. Studies have shown that vascular remodelling in the embryo proceeds without the presence of erythrocytes, which are responsible for oxygen delivery. Therefore, vascular remodelling does not depend on the presence of oxygen and in fact occurs before perfused tissues require oxygen delivery. However, it is still unknown whether or not other nutrients or genetic factors may have promotional effects on vascular remodelling.

Measurement of parabolic velocity profiles in live embryo vessels indicate that vessel walls are exposed to levels of laminar and shear stress which can have a bioactive effect. Shear stress on embryonic mouse and chicken vasculature ranges between 1 – 5 dyn/cm2. This can be measured by either cutting sections of blood vessels and observing the angle of the opening, which bends to relieve residual stress, or by measuring the hematocrit present in blood vessels and calculating the apparent viscosity of the fluid.

Due to the difficulties involved with imaging live embryo development and accurately measuring small values of viscosity, pressure, velocity, and flow direction, increased importance has been placed on developing an accurate model of this process. This way, an effective method for studying these effects in vitro may be found.

== Modelling ==
A number of models have been proposed to describe fluid effects on the vascular remodelling in the embryo. One point which is often missed in these analogies is the fact that the process occurs within a living system; dead end can break off and reattach elsewhere, branches close and open at junctions or form valves, and vessels are extremely deformable, able to quickly adapt to new conditions and form new pathways. Theoretically, the formation of the vascular tree can be thought of in terms of percolation theory. The network of tubes arises randomly and will eventually establish a path between two separate and unconnected points. Once some critical number of sprouting tubes have migrated into a previously unoccupied area, a path called a fractal can be established between these two points. Fractals are biologically useful constructions, as they rely on an infinite increase in surface area, which in biological terms translates to a vast increase in transport efficiency of nutrients and wastes. The fractal path is flexible; if one connection is broken, another forms to re-establish the path. This is a useful illustration of how the vascular tree forms, although it cannot be used as a model. The diffusion-limited aggregation model has given simulated results which are closest in comparison to vascular trees in vivo. This model suggests that vascular growth occurs along a gradient of shear stress at the vessel wall, which results in the growth of vessel radii. Diffusion-limited aggregation proposes that an aggregate grows by the fusion of random walkers, which themselves walk along a pressure gradient. Random walk is simply a probability-based version of the diffusion equation. Thus, in applying this model to the vascular tree, small, resistant vessels must be replaced with large, conducting vessels in order to balance the pressure across the entire system. This model yields a structure which is more random at the tips than in the major lines, which is related to the fact that Laplacian formulations are stable when speed is negative with respect to pressure gradient. In major lines, this is always so, but in small sprouts the speed fluctuates around 0, leading to unstable, random behaviour.

Another large component of the remodelling process is the disconnection of branched vessels, which then migrate to distal areas in order to supply blood homogeneously. Branching morphogenesis has been found to follow the dielectric breakdown model, in that only the vessels with sufficient flow will enlarge, while others will close off. At locations inside the vessel where two tube split off from one, one arm of the split is likely to close, detach, and migrate towards the venous line, where it will re-attach. The result of the closure of a branch is that flow increases and becomes less turbulent in the main line, while blood also begins to flow towards areas which are lacking. Which branch will close depends on the flow rate, direction, and branching angle; in general, a branching angle of 75° or more will necessitate the closing of the smaller branch.

Thus, several important parameters of vascular remodelling can be described using the combined models of diffusion-limited aggregation and dielectric breakdown: the probability that a branch will close off (plasticity of vessel splitting), that a vessel will reconnect to the venous line (plasticity of sprout regrowth), shrinkage resistance of sprouting tips (a balance between external compression and internal shear stress), and the ratio of external tissue growth to internal vessel expansion. However, this model does not take into effect the diffusion of oxygen or signalling factors which may play a role in embryonic vascular remodelling. These models consistently reproduce most aspects of the vasculature seen in vivo in several different specialized cases.

== Application to study of disease progression ==
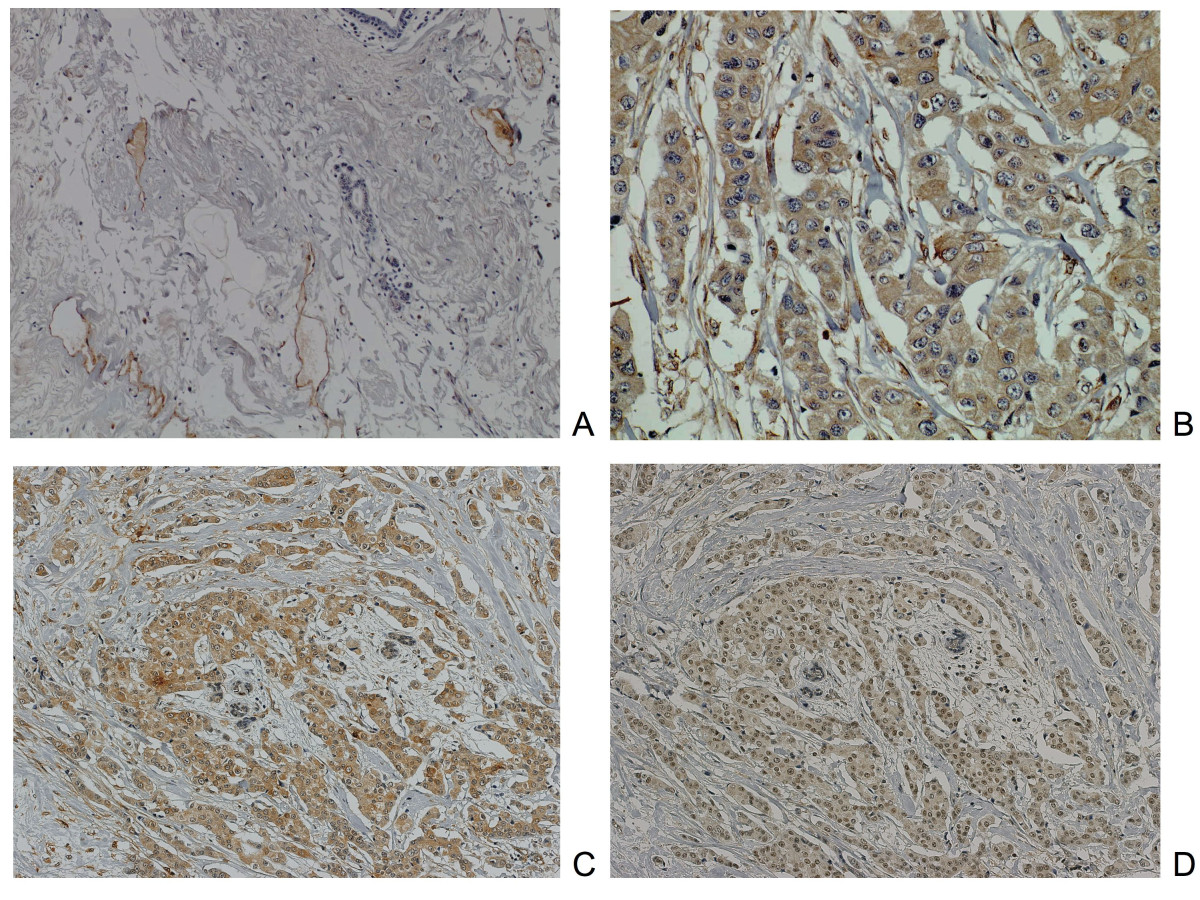
Neuropilin 2 expression in (A) blood vessels, (B) carcinoma tissue, (C and D) breast carcinoma tissue with co-localized staining for neuropilin 2 and CXCR4, a chemokine receptor. Neuropilin 2 is a known marker for venous blood vessels, indicating the vascularization of the tumour.

Vascular remodelling in non-embryonic tissues is considered to be symptomatic of disease progression. Cardiovascular disease remains one of the most common causes of death globally and is often associated with the blockage or stenosis of blood vessels, which can have dramatic biomechanical effects. In acute and chronic remodelling, the increase in shear stress due to the decreased diameter of a blocked vessel can cause vasodilation, thereby restoring typical shear stress levels. However, dilation also leads to increased blood flow through the vessel, which can result in hyperaemia, affect physiological regulatory actions downstream of the afflicted vessel, and place increased pressure on atherosclerotic plaques which may lead to rupture. Blockage of blood vessels is currently treated by surgically inserting stents to force vessel diameters open and restore normal blood flow. By understanding the implication of increased shear stress on homeostatic regulators, alternative, less-invasive methods may be developed to treat vessel blockage.

The growth of tumours often results in reactivation of blood vessel growth and vascular remodelling in order to perfuse the new tissue with blood and sustain its proliferation. Tumour growth has been shown to be self-organizing and to behave more similarly to embryonic tissues than to adult tissues. As well, vessel growth and flow dynamics in tumours are thought to recapitulate the vessel growth in developing embryos. In this sense, embryonic vascular remodelling can be considered a model of the same pathways which are activated in tumour growth, and increased understanding of these pathways can lead to novel therapeutics which may inhibit tumour formation.

Conversely, angiogenesis and vascular remodelling is an important aspect of wound healing and the long-term stability of tissue grafts. When blood flow is disrupted, angiogenesis provides sprouting vessels which migrate into deprived tissues and restore perfusion. Thus, the study of vascular remodelling may also provide important insight into the development of new techniques to improve wound healing and benefit the integration of tissues from transplants by lowering the incidence of rejection.
