= Hanna Mikkola =

Finnish-American physician

Hanna K.A. Mikkola
- Born: Finland
- Education: University of Helsinki
- Scientific career
- Workplaces: University of California, Los Angeles; Harvard Medical School; University of Lund
- Thesis: Molecular basis of coagulation factor XIII deficiency (1997)

Hanna K.A. Mikkola is a Finnish-American physician who is Professor of Molecular, Cell and Developmental Biology a University of California, Los Angeles. Her research investigates the generation of blood stem cells during embryonic development. She looks to develop blood stem cell based treatments for leukemia.

== Early life and education ==
Mikkola completed her medical doctorate at the University of Helsinki. She remained there for her doctoral research, when she studied hemophilia. In particular, Mikkola was interested in the molecular basis of coagulation factor XIII. After earning her doctorate, Mikkola moved to the University of Lund as a postdoctoral fellow. She spent three years in Sweden before joining Harvard Medical School.

== Research and career ==
Mikkola develops blood stem cells (hematopoietic stem cells) that can be used as treatments for blood cancers and immune disorders. The limited capacity of blood stem cells to self-renew and propensity to differentiate into many different cell types in lab culture. Mikkola looks to understand the mechanisms that regulate the development of stem cells (blood stem cells and cardiovascular stem cells). She looks to identify pathways to make human embryonic stem cells to generate blood stem cells. Mikkola has identified protein-encoding genes (MLLT3 and MYCT1) that enable blood stem cells to renew in a lab dish.

Mikkola created new markers that can identify blood stem cells as they emerge from the hemogenic endothelium. She has looked to understand the mechanisms that determine the self-renewal and specification of blood stem cells. These findings have informed the creation of a cell map of blood stem cell development. The self-renewal and specification mechanisms are involved in leukemogenesis, a process that causes mutations of blood stem cells and results in leukemia. She studies the transcriptional regulatory network (TRN) involved in the development of blood cells, Understanding TRNs will help to uncover the pathways that are impacted by leukemia and develop more effective treatments.

== Selected publications ==
- Vijay G Sankaran; Tobias F Menne; Jian Xu; et al. (4 December 2008). "Human fetal hemoglobin expression is regulated by the developmental stage-specific repressor BCL11A". Science. 322 (5909): 1839–1842. doi:10.1126/science.1165409. ISSN 0036-8075. PMID 19056937. Wikidata Q39908659.
- Christos Gekas; Francoise Dieterlen-Lièvre; Stuart H Orkin; Hanna K A Mikkola (1 March 2005). "The placenta is a niche for hematopoietic stem cells". Developmental Cell. 8 (3): 365–375. doi:10.1016/j.devcel.2004.12.016. ISSN 1534-5807. PMID 15737932. Wikidata Q81454033.
- Hanna K A Mikkola; Stuart H Orkin (1 October 2006). "The journey of developing hematopoietic stem cells". Development. 133 (19): 3733–3744. doi:10.1242/dev.02568. ISSN 0950-1991. PMID 16968814. Wikidata Q34652843.
