= Fibrocyte =

Inactive mesenchymal cell

Details
- Location: Mesenchyme
- Function: Inactive

Identifiers
- Latin: fibrocytus
- TH: H2.00.03.0.01003
- FMA: 63879

A fibrocyte is an inactive mesenchymal cell, that is, a cell showing minimal cytoplasm, limited amounts of rough endoplasmic reticulum, and lacks biochemical evidence of protein synthesis.

The term fibrocyte contrasts with the term fibroblast. Fibroblasts are activated connective tissue cells characterized by synthesis of proteins of the fibrous matrix, particularly the collagens. When tissue is injured, the predominant mesenchymal cells, the fibroblast, have been believed to be derived from the fibrocyte or possibly from smooth muscle cells lining vessels and glands. Commonly, fibroblasts express smooth muscle actin, a form of actin first found in smooth muscle cells and not found in resting fibrocytes. Fibroblasts expressing this form of actin are usually called "myo-fibroblasts."

Recently, the term "fibrocyte" has also been applied to a bloodborne cell able to leave the blood, enter tissue and become a fibroblast. As part of the more general topic of stem cell biology, a number of studies have suggested that the blood contains marrow derived cells that can differentiate into fibroblasts. These cells have been reported to express the hematopoietic cell surface markers CD34+, CD45+, as well as collagen. These cells can migrate to wound sites, suggesting a role in wound healing. There are several studies suggesting that fibrocytes mediate wound healing and fibrotic tissue repair.

== See also ==
- List of human cell types derived from the germ layers
