= Peg cell =

A peg cell is a non-ciliated epithelial secretory cell within the uterine tube (oviduct or fallopian tube). These cells represent one of three epithelial cell types found within the normal fallopian tube epithelium and only make up around 10% of the total number of cells. The other two cell types are ciliated columnar and intercalary cells. The ratio of these remaining cells is dictated by an individual's hormone status. Peg cells secrete nutrients for the egg cell.

== Function ==
Thought to represent a quiescent maturational stage of secretory cells.

== See also ==
- List of distinct cell types in the adult human body
- List of human cell types derived from the germ layers
