= EndoMac progenitor cell =

EndoMac progenitor cells are a type of endothelial-macrophage progenitor cells, more specifically a population of hemangioblasts from postnatal tissue. They were discovered by Australian researchers in the aorta of mice.
