= Cholecystocyte =

Type of cell found in the gallbladder

Details
- Location: Gallbladder
- Function: Epithelium

Identifiers
- Latin: cholecystocytus
- TH: H3.04.06.0.00006

A cholecystocyte is an epithelial cell found in the gallbladder tightly joined by junctional complexes.

== See also ==
- List of human cell types derived from the germ layers
