= Hemangioblast =

Cell type

Details
- Precursor: Mesenchyme (derived from lateral mesoderm)

Identifiers
- Latin: hemangioblastus
- MeSH: D055018
- TH: H2.00.04.3.01002

Hemangioblasts are the multipotent precursor cells that can differentiate into both hematopoietic and endothelial cells. In the mouse embryo, the emergence of blood islands in the yolk sac at embryonic day 7 marks the onset of hematopoiesis. From these blood islands, the hematopoietic cells and vasculature are formed shortly after. Hemangioblasts are the progenitors that form the blood islands. To date, the hemangioblast has been identified in human, mouse and zebrafish embryos.

Hemangioblasts have been first extracted from embryonic cultures and manipulated by cytokines to differentiate along either hematopoietic or endothelial route. It has been shown that these pre-endothelial/pre-hematopoietic cells in the embryo arise out of a phenotype CD34 population. It was then found that hemangioblasts are also present in the tissue of post-natal individuals, such as in newborn infants and adults.

== Adult hemangioblast ==
There is now emerging evidence of hemangioblasts that continue to exist in the adult as circulating stem cells in the peripheral blood that can give rise to both endothelial cells and hematopoietic cells. These cells are thought to express both CD34 and CD133 These cells are likely derived from the bone marrow, and may even be derived from hematopoietic stem cells.

== History ==
The hemangioblast was first hypothesized in 1900 by Wilhelm His. Existence of the hemangioblast was first proposed in 1917 by Florence Sabin, who observed the close spatial and temporal proximity of the emergence of blood vessels and red blood cells within the yolk sac in chick embryos. In 1932, making the same observation as Sabin, Murray coined the term “hemangioblast”.

The hypothesis of a bipotential precursor was further supported by the fact that endothelial cells and hematopoietic cells share many of the same markers, including Flk1, Vegf, CD34, Scl, Gata2, Runx1, and Pecam-1. Furthermore, it was shown that depletion of Flk1 in the developing embryo results in disappearance of both hematopoietic cells and endothelial cells.

=== Isolation ===
In 1997, Kennedy from the Keller Lab first isolated the in vitro equivalent of the hemangioblast. These cells were termed blast colony forming cells (BL-CFC). Using aggregates of differentiating mouse embryonic stem cells called embryoid bodies, the authors plated cells in the differentiation timeline just prior to the arise of hematopoietic cells. In the presence of the proper cytokines, a subset of these cells was able to differentiate into hematopoietic lineages. In addition, these same cells can also be differentiated into endothelial cells, as shown by Choi of the Keller Lab.

In 2004, hemangioblasts were isolated in the mouse embryo by Huber of the Keller Lab. They are derived from the posterior primitive streak region of the mesoderm in the gastrulating embryo. By using limiting dilutions, the authors demonstrated that the resulting hematopoietic and endothelial cells were indeed of clonal origin, proving that they had successfully isolated the hemangioblast in the developing embryo.

== See also ==
- Hemogenic endothelium
- Angioblast
- Endothelial progenitor cell
- EndoMac progenitor cell
- Vasculogenesis
- Hemangioblastoma
- List of human cell types derived from the germ layers
