= List of human cell types derived from the germ layers =

This is a list of cells in humans derived from the three embryonic germ layers – ectoderm, mesoderm, and endoderm.

== Cells derived from the ectoderm ==
=== Surface ectoderm ===
==== Skin ====
- Trichocyte
- Keratinocyte

==== Anterior pituitary ====
- Gonadotrope
- Corticotrope
- Thyrotrope
- Somatotrope
- Lactotroph

==== Tooth enamel ====
- Ameloblast

=== Neural crest ===
==== Peripheral nervous system ====
- Neuron
- Glia
  - Schwann cell
  - Satellite glial cell

==== Neuroendocrine system ====
- Chromaffin cell
- Glomus cell

==== Skin ====
- Melanocyte
  - Nevus cell
- Merkel cell

==== Teeth ====
- Odontoblast
- Cementoblast

==== Eyes ====
- Corneal keratocyte

=== Neural tube ===
==== Central nervous system ====
- Neuron
- Glia
  - Astrocyte
  - Ependymocytes
  - Müller glia (retina)
  - Oligodendrocyte
  - Oligodendrocyte progenitor cell
  - Pituicyte (posterior pituitary)

==== Pineal gland ====
- Pinealocyte

== Cells derived from the mesoderm ==
Mesoderm embryonic tissues (paraxial mesoderm, intermediate mesoderm, lateral plate mesoderm and notochord). Also showing the neural tube and the yolk sac.

=== Paraxial mesoderm ===
See main article on Paraxial mesoderm.

==== Mesenchymal stem cell ====
See Mesenchymal stem cell.

===== Osteochondroprogenitor cell =====
- Bone (Osteoblast → Osteocyte)
- Cartilage (Chondroblast → Chondrocyte)

===== Myofibroblast =====
- Fat
  - Lipoblast → Adipocyte
- Muscle
  - Myoblast → Myocyte
  - Myosatellite cell
  - Tendon cell
  - Cardiac muscle cell
- Other
  - Fibroblast → Fibrocyte

==== Other ====
- Digestive system
  - Interstitial cell of Cajal
  - Spleen

=== Intermediate mesoderm ===
See main article on Intermediate mesoderm.

==== Kidney ====
- Podocyte
- Angioblast → Endothelial cell
- Mesangial cell
  - Intraglomerular
  - Extraglomerular
- Juxtaglomerular cell
- Macula densa cell
- Stromal cell → Interstitial cell → Telocytes
- Kidney proximal tubule brush border cell
- Kidney distal tubule cell
- Connecting tubule cells
- α-intercalated cell
- β-intercalated cell
- Principal cells

==== Reproductive system ====
- Sertoli cell
- Leydig cell
- Granulosa cell
- Peg cell
- Germ cells (which migrate here primordially)
  - spermatozoon
  - ovum

=== Lateral plate mesoderm ===
See main article on Lateral plate mesoderm.

==== Hematopoietic stem cell ====
- Lymphoid
  - Lymphoblast
  - see lymphocytes
- Myeloid
  - CFU-GEMM
  - see myeloid cells

==== Circulatory system ====
- Endothelial progenitor cell
- Endothelial colony forming cell
- Endothelial stem cell
- Angioblast/Mesoangioblast
- Pericyte
- Mural cell

==== Body cavities ====
- Mesothelial cell

=== Axial mesoderm ===
See main article on Axial mesoderm.

==== Notochord ====
- Nucleus pulposus (NP) cells

== Cells derived from the endoderm ==
=== Foregut ===
==== Respiratory system ====
- Pneumocyte
  - Type I cell
  - Type II cell
- Club cell
- Goblet cell
- Pulmonary neuroendocrine cell

==== Digestive system ====
===== Stomach =====
- Gastric enteroendocrine cells
  - G cell
  - Delta cell
  - Enterochromaffin-like cell
- Gastric chief cell
- Parietal cell
- Foveolar cell

===== Intestine =====
- Intestinal enteroendocrine cells
  - S cell
  - Delta cell
  - Cholecystokinin
  - Enterochromaffin cell
- Goblet cell
- Brunner's gland cell
- Paneth cell
- Tuft cell
- Enterocyte
  - Microfold cell

===== Liver and gallbladder =====
- Hepatocyte
- Hepatic stellate cell
- Cholangiocyte
- Cholecystocyte

==== Pancreas ====
- Exocrine component of pancreas
  - Pancreatic ductal cells
  - Pancreatic acinar cell
  - Centroacinar cell
  - Pancreatic stellate cell
- Islets of Langerhans
  - Alpha cell
  - Beta cell
  - PP cell (F cell, gamma cell)
  - Delta cell
  - Epsilon cell

=== Pharyngeal pouch ===
- Thyroid gland
  - Follicular cell
  - Parafollicular cell
- Parathyroid gland
  - Parathyroid chief cell
  - Oxyphil cell
- Thymus gland
  - Thymic epithelial cell

=== Hindgut/cloaca ===
- Urothelial cell (renal pelvis, ureters, bladder and urethra)
- Prostate epithelial cell

== See also ==
- Germ layer
- List of distinct cell types in the adult human body
