= Monocytopenia =

- Specialty: Hematology

Monocytopenia is a form of leukopenia associated with a deficiency of monocytes.

It has been proposed as a measure during chemotherapy to predict neutropenia, though some research indicates that it is less effective than lymphopenia.

== Causes ==
The causes of monocytopenia include: acute infections, stress, treatment with glucocorticoids, aplastic anemia, hairy cell leukemia, acute myeloid leukemia, treatment with myelotoxic drugs, intestinal resection, and genetic syndromes, as for example MonoMAC syndrome.

== Diagnosis ==
- Blood Test (CBC) (Normal range of Monocytes: 1-10%) (Normal range in males: 0.2-0.8 x 10 3 /microliter)

- Blood test checking for monocytopenia (Abnormal ranges: <1%) (Abnormal range in males: <0.2 x 10 3 /microliter)

== Treatment ==
Monocytopenia may be treated with hematopoietic stem cell transplantation.
