= MonoMAC =

monoMAC syndrome
- Other names: MonoMAC/DCML, monocytopenia and mycobacterium avium complex/dendritic cell, monocyte, B and NK lymphocyte deficiency
- Specialty: Medical genetics

MonoMAC or MonoMAC syndrome is a rare autosomal dominant syndrome associated with: monocytopenia, B and NK cell lymphopenia; mycobacterial, viral, fungal, and bacterial opportunistic infections; and virus infection-induced cancers. The disorder often progresses to the development of myelodysplasia, myeloid leukemias, and other types of cancer. MonoMAC is a life-threatening and precancerous disorder.

Inactivating mutations in one of the two parental GATA2 genes is responsible for the many diverse presentations of a genetic disorder that groups these presentations together into a single disease termed GATA2 deficiency. These autosomal dominant mutations are known or presumed to cause a reduction, i.e. a haploinsufficiency, in the cellular levels of the gene's product, GATA2. The GATA2 protein is a transcription factor critical for the embryonic development, maintenance, and functionality of blood-forming, lympathic-forming, and other tissue-forming stem cells. In consequence of these mutations, cellular levels of GATA2 are deficient and individuals develop over time hematological, immunological, lymphatic, and/or other disorders that may begin as apparently benign abnormalities but commonly progress to severe organ (e.g. lung) failure, enhanced susceptibility to opportunistic infections, virus infection-induced cancers, the myelodysplastic syndrome, and/or various types of leukemia. MonoMAC is a presentation of GATA2 deficiency that involves primarily signs and symptoms of immune deficiency that cause an extremely high susceptibility to infections and infection-induced benign and malignant tumors. In addition to this, however, MonoMAC-afflicted individuals often show one or more signs and symptoms of other GATA2 presentations.

MonoMAC was first described by Vihn and colleagues in 2010 as an autosomal dominant familial disease. One year later, Dickinson and colleagues discovered that the MonoMAC disorder in four individuals was associated with any one of four different mutations in the GATA2 gene. Subsequent studies identified numerous other GATA2 gene mutations that are associated with the development of MonoMAC, showed that these mutations inactivated or were considered likely to inactivate one of two parental GATA2 genes, and found that essentially all individuals with MonoMAC had one of the mutations known or considered to inactivate GATA2.

== Signs and symptoms ==
This syndrome is characterized by an increased susceptibility to disseminated nontuberculous mycobacterial infections, viral infections, especially with human papillomaviruses, and fungal infections, primarily histoplasmosis, and molds. There is profound monocytopenia, B lymphocytopenia and NK lymphocytopenia. Patients have an increased chance of developing malignancies, including: myelodysplasia/leukemia vulvar carcinoma, metastatic melanoma, cervical carcinoma, Bowen disease of the vulva, and multiple Epstein–Barr virus(+) leiomyosarcoma. Patients may also develop pulmonary alveolar proteinosis without mutations in the granulocyte-macrophage colony-stimulating factor receptor or anti-granulocyte-macrophage colony-stimulating factor autoantibodies. Last, patients may develop autoimmune phenomena, including lupus like syndromes, primary biliary cirrhosis or aggressive multiple sclerosis.

Of the 26, now 28, patients probably afflicted by this syndrome, 48% died of causes ranging from cancer to myelodysplasia with a mean age at death of 34.7 years and median age of 36.5 years.

Clinical features and complications of the syndrome
Clinical feature	Overall (%)	Autosomal dominant patients (%)	Sporadic patients (%)
Infection
Mycobacteria	78	86	73
HPV	78	86	73
Fungi	28	43	18
Complication
PAP	33	29	36
Panniculitis/erythema nodosum	33	29	36
Myelodiysplasia/acute myeloid leukemia	50	71	36
Death	28	43	18

== Genetics ==
12 distinct mutations in the GATA2 gene have been identified. They include missense mutations affecting the zinc finger-2 domain and insertion/deletion mutations leading to frameshifts and premature termination.

== Diagnosis ==
Identification of associated mutations in the GATA2 gene is diagnostic. GATA2 sequencing is offered by the Molecular Diagnostics Laboratory at Hospital Sainte-Justine (CHUSJ), Mayo Clinic and LabCorp/Invitae.

== Treatment ==
Bone marrow transplants are currently the only treatment.

== See also ==
- Primary immunodeficiency
- Genetic disorder
