= SPI1 =

Protein-coding gene in the species Homo sapiens

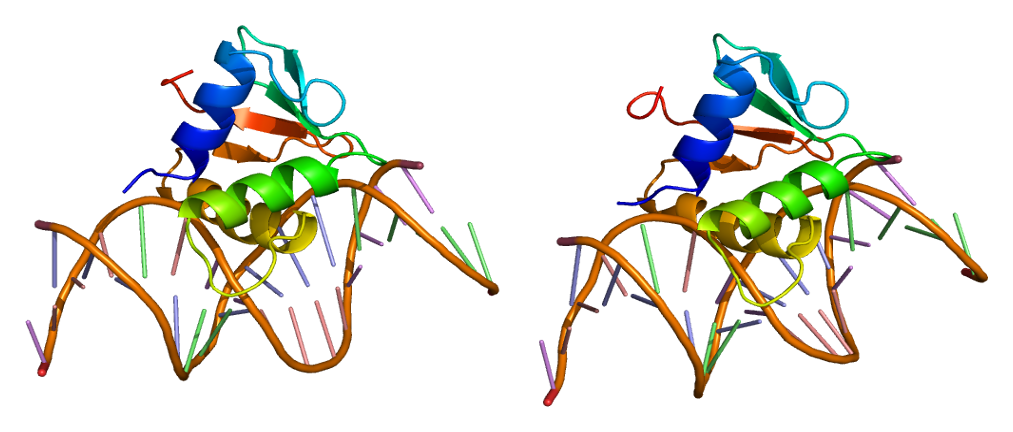
- Mouse SPI1

Identifiers
- Aliases: SPI1, OF, PU.1, SFPI1, SPI-1, SPI-A, Spi-1 proto-oncogene, AGM10
- External IDs: OMIM: 165170; MGI: 98282; GeneCards: SPI1
Available structures
PDB	Ortholog search: PDBe RCSB
PDB	List of PDB id codes 1PUE

Gene location (Human)
Chr.	Chromosome 11 (human)
Band	11p11.2	Start	47,354,860 bp
Band	11p11.2	End	47,378,547 bp

Gene location (Mouse)
Chr.	Chromosome 2 (mouse)
Band	2 E1|2 50.44 cM	Start	90,912,735 bp
Band	2 E1|2 50.44 cM	End	90,946,101 bp
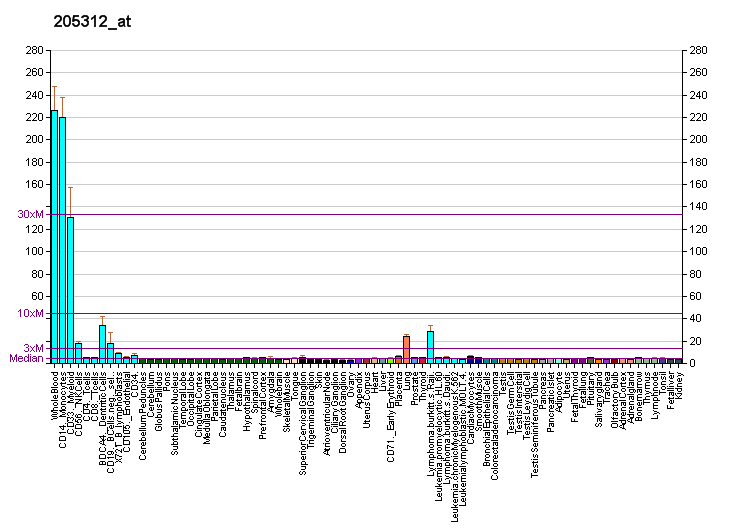
RNA expression pattern
Bgee	Human / Mouse (ortholog); Top expressed in: granulocyte; monocyte; right lung; upper lobe of left lung; spleen; blood; bone marrow cell; appendix; right coronary artery; lymph node / Top expressed in: granulocyte; tibiofemoral joint; mesenteric lymph nodes; stroma of bone marrow; spleen; blood; medulla of thymus; embryo; lip; ankle joint; More reference expression data
BioGPS	More reference expression data
Gene ontology
Molecular function	DNA binding; sequence-specific DNA binding; DNA-binding transcription activator activity, RNA polymerase II-specific; RNA polymerase II cis-regulatory region sequence-specific DNA binding; transcription factor activity, RNA polymerase II core promoter proximal region sequence-specific binding; DNA-binding transcription repressor activity, RNA polymerase II-specific; protein binding; RNA binding; transcription factor activity, RNA polymerase II distal enhancer sequence-specific binding; DNA-binding transcription factor activity; NFAT protein binding; DNA-binding transcription factor activity, RNA polymerase II-specific; transcription factor binding
Cellular component	nucleus; nucleoplasm; transcription regulator complex
Biological process	myeloid leukocyte differentiation; regulation of transcription, DNA-templated; cellular response to ethanol; somatic stem cell population maintenance; lymphocyte differentiation; regulation of erythrocyte differentiation; myeloid dendritic cell differentiation; negative regulation of transcription by RNA polymerase II; negative regulation of MHC class II biosynthetic process; lymphoid progenitor cell differentiation; transcription, DNA-templated; macrophage differentiation; anatomical structure regression; negative regulation of histone H4 acetylation; negative regulation of gene expression, epigenetic; vasculature development; granulocyte differentiation; apoptotic process involved in blood vessel morphogenesis; histone H3 acetylation; erythrocyte differentiation; hypermethylation of CpG island; positive regulation of pri-miRNA transcription by RNA polymerase II; positive regulation of transcription by RNA polymerase II; negative regulation of transcription, DNA-templated; positive regulation of transcription, DNA-templated; regulation of transcription by RNA polymerase II; pri-miRNA transcription by RNA polymerase II; cell differentiation; interleukin-6-mediated signaling pathway
Sources:Amigo / QuickGO
Orthologs
Databases	NCBI: entry; OMA: entry
Species	Human	Mouse
Entrez	6688	20375
Ensembl	ENSG00000066336	ENSMUSG00000002111
UniProt	P17947	P17433
RefSeq (mRNA)	NM_001080547; NM_003120	NM_011355; NM_001378898; NM_001378899
RefSeq (protein)	NP_001074016; NP_003111	NP_035485; NP_001365827; NP_001365828
Location (UCSC)	Chr 11: 47.35 – 47.38 Mb	Chr 2: 90.91 – 90.95 Mb
PubMed search
- Wikidata
View/Edit Human	View/Edit Mouse

Transcription factor PU.1 is a protein that in humans is encoded by the SPI1 gene.

== Function ==
This gene encodes an ETS-domain transcription factor that activates gene expression during myeloid and B-lymphoid cell development. The nuclear protein binds to a purine-rich sequence known as the PU-box found on enhancers of target genes, and regulates their expression in coordination with other transcription factors and cofactors. The protein can also regulate alternative splicing of target genes. Multiple transcript variants encoding different isoforms have been found for this gene.

The PU.1 transcription factor is essential for hematopoiesis and cell fate decisions. PU.1 can physically interact with a variety of regulatory factors like SWI/SNF, TFIID, GATA-2, GATA-1 and c-Jun. The protein-protein interactions between these factors can regulate PU.1-dependent cell fate decisions. PU.1 can modulate the expression of 3000 genes in hematopoietic cells including cytokines. It is expressed in monocytes, granulocytes, B and NK cells but is absent in T cells, reticulocytes and megakaryocytes. Its transcription is regulated by various mechanisms .

PU.1 is an essential regulator of the pro-fibrotic system. In fibrotic conditions, PU.1 expression is perturbed, resulting in upregulation of fibrosis-associated genes in fibroblasts. Disruption of PU.1 in pro-fibrotic fibroblasts leads to them returning into their resting state. PU.1 is seen to be highly expressed in extracellular matrix-producing pro-fibrotic fibroblasts while it is downregulated in inflammatory/ ECM-degrading and resting fibroblasts. The majority of the cells expressing PU.1 in fibrotic conditions are fibroblasts with a few infiltrating lymphocytes. PU.1 induces the polarization of resting and inflammatory fibroblasts into pro-fibrotic fibroblasts.

== Structure ==
The ETS domain is the DNA-binding module of PU.1 and other ETS-family transcription factors.

== Interactions ==
SPI1 has been shown to interact with:

- FUS,
- GATA2,
- IRF4, and
- NONO.
