= Copy number analysis =

Process of analyzing data produced by a test for DNA copy number variation

Schematic karyogram of a typical human cell during the G_{0} phase in relation to the cell cycle, which is most common phase among human cells, and wherein there will be two pairs of each chromosome (designated 2n), each with one copy of each locus (for a total of 2c). In contrast, at center top it also shows the chromosome 3 pair in metaphase, which is among the phases occurring after DNA synthesis but before cell division, where each chromosome will have two copies of each locus, connected at the centromere, for a total of 2n and 4c.

Copy number analysis is the process of analyzing data produced by a test for DNA copy number variation in an organism's sample. One application of such analysis is the detection of chromosomal copy number variation that may cause or may increase risks of various critical disorders. Copy number variation can be detected with various types of tests such as fluorescent in situ hybridization, comparative genomic hybridization and with high-resolution array-based tests based on array comparative genomic hybridization (or aCGH), SNP array technologies and high resolution microarrays that include copy number probes as well an SNPs. Copy-number analysis is also performed from next-generation sequencing data, where methods use signals such as read depth and discordant or split read mappings to infer copy-number changes and their breakpoints. Array-based methods have been accepted as the most efficient in terms of their resolution and high-throughput nature and the highest coverage (choose an array with over 2 million probes) and they are also referred to as virtual karyotype. Data analysis for an array-based DNA copy number test can be very challenging though due to very high volume of data that come out of an array platform.

BAC (Bacterial Artificial Chromosome) arrays were historically the first microarray platform to be used for DNA copy number analysis. This platform is used to identify gross deletions or amplifications in DNA. Such anomalies for example are common in cancer and can be used for diagnosis of many developmental disorders. Data produced by such platforms are usually low to medium resolution in terms of genome coverage. Usually, log-ratio measurements are produced by this technology to represent deviation of patient's copy number state from normal. Such measurements then are studied and those that significantly differ from zero value are announced to represent a part of a chromosome with an anomaly (an abnormal copy number state). Positive log-ratios indicate a region of DNA copy number gain and negative log-ratio values mark a region of DNA copy number loss. Even a single data point can be declared an indication of a copy number gain or a copy number loss in BAC arrays.

== See also ==
- Bioinformatics
- DNA microarray
