= Angioblast =

Progenitor cell that differentiates into capillary endothelium

Angioblasts (or vasoformative cells) are embryonic cells from which the endothelium of blood vessels arises. They are derived from embryonic mesoderm. Blood vessels first make their appearance in several scattered vascular areas (blood islands) that are developed simultaneously between the endoderm and the mesoderm of the yolk-sac, i. e., outside the body of the embryo. Here a new type of cell, the angioblast, is differentiated from the mesoderm.

These cells as they divide form small, dense syncytial masses, which soon join with similar masses by means of fine processes to form plexuses. They form capillaries through vasculogenesis and angiogenesis.

Angioblasts are one of the two products formed from hemangioblasts (the other being multipotential hemopoietic stem cells).

== See also ==
- List of human cell types derived from the germ layers
