= Vascularisation =

Formation of blood vessels

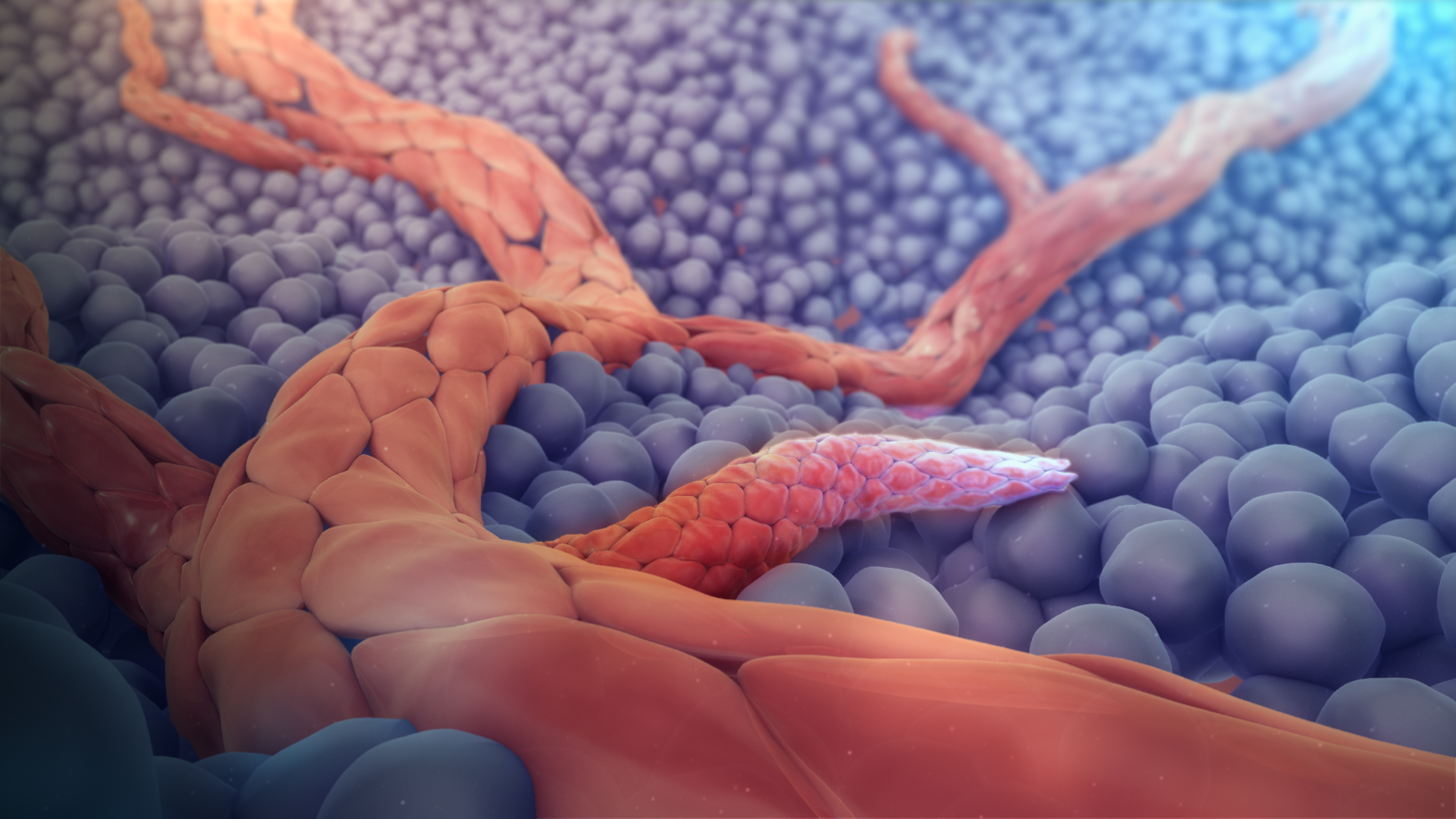
- 3D medical animation still showing angiogenesis
- Biological system: cardiovascular system
- Action: Involuntary
- Method: Vasculogenesis; Angiogenesis; Arteriogenesis; Lymphangiogenesis

Vascularisation is the physiological process through which blood vessels form in tissues or organs. Neovascularization (neo- + vascular + -ization) specifically refers to the growth of new blood supply in a tissue or organ following an injury, chronic inflammation or metabolic distress.

Growth factors that modulate neovascularization include those that affect endothelial cell division and differentiation. These growth factors often act in a paracrine or autocrine fashion; they include fibroblast growth factor, placental growth factor, insulin-like growth factor, hepatocyte growth factor, and platelet-derived endothelial growth factor.

It may occur through angiogenesis (the formation of new blood vessels form from pre-existing ones), vasculogenesis (the creation of blood vessels during development, particularly in embryos) or arteriogenesis (where smaller vessels become enlarged into fully functioning arteries).

== Vasculogenesis ==
Vasculogenesis is the process of blood vessel formation, occurring by a de novo production of endothelial cells. It is the first stage of the formation of the vascular network, closely followed by angiogenesis.

This is the creation of blood vessels during early development particularly in embryos. Blood vessels start to form from special cells known as endothelial progenitor cells. While this process mostly happens during embryonic development, it can also occur in adults when the body needs to repair damaged blood vessels or grow new ones after an injury occurs.

Vasculogenesis is the formation of new blood vessels, in blood islands, which first arise in the mesoderm of the yolk sac at 3 weeks of development, when there are no pre-existing ones. For example, if a monolayer of endothelial cells begins sprouting to form capillaries, angiogenesis is occurring. Vasculogenesis, in contrast, is when endothelial precursor cells (angioblasts) migrate and differentiate in response to local cues (such as growth factors and extracellular matrices) to form new blood vessels. These vascular trees are then pruned and extended through angiogenesis.

Vasculogenesis can also arise in the adult organism from circulating endothelial progenitor cells (derivatives of stem cells). These cells are able to contribute, albeit to varying degrees, to neovascularization. Examples of where vasculogenesis can occur in adults are:

- Tumor growth (see HP59)
- Revascularization or neovascularization after trauma, for example, after cardiac ischemia or retinal ischemia
- Endometriosis - It appears that up to 37% of the microvascular endothelium of the ectopic endometrial tissue originates from endothelial progenitor cells.

== Angiogenesis ==
It is the process where new blood vessels form from pre-existing ones. This happens naturally when the body needs to repair tissue or when a wound needs to heal. It is driven by signals from growth factors, such as Vascular Endothelial Growth Factor (VEGF), which prompts the formation of new vessels. However, this process can occasionally go wrong in tumour formation where it allows the tumours to create their own blood supply and grow larger, which can contribute to diseases like cancer.

Angiogenesis is the most common type of neovascularization seen in development and growth, and is important to both physiological and pathological processes. Angiogenesis occurs through the formation of new vessels from pre-existing vessels. This occurs through the sprouting of new capillaries from post-capillary venules, requiring precise coordination of multiple steps and the participation and communication of multiple cell types. The complex process is initiated in response to local tissue ischemia or hypoxia, leading to the release of angiogenic factors such as VEGF and HIF-1. This leads to vasodilatation and an increase in vascular permeability, leading to sprouting angiogenesis or intussusceptive angiogenesis.

== Arteriogenesis ==
This is a process where smaller and less efficient blood vessels become enlarged into fully functioning arteries. This usually happens in response to increased demand in the body such as during exercise or when blood vessels are blocked. This aids in ensuring that tissues are supplied with enough blood and oxygen.

Arteriogenesis is the process of flow-related remodelling of existing vasculature to create collateral arteries. This can occur in response to ischemic vascular diseases or increase demand (e.g. exercise training). Arteriogenesis is triggered through nonspecific factors, such as shear stress and blood flow.

== Lymphangiogenesis ==
This process is similar to angiogenesis but involves the creation of lymphatic vessels which are essential for draining excess fluid and fighting infections. This process is also key to conditions like inflammation and the spreading of cancer.

== Applications in medicine ==
=== Cancer ===
In cancer, tumours take over the body's vascularisation processes to supply themselves with blood, helping them grow and spread. Anti-angiogenic therapies are currently used in combination with other therapies for cancer management. Bevacizumab, a monoclonal antibody & VEGF inhibitor is approved for use in cancer treatment.

=== Ocular pathologies ===
==== Corneal neovascularization ====
Corneal neovascularization is a condition where new blood vessels invade into the cornea from the limbus. It is triggered when the balance between angiogenic and antiangiogenic factors are disrupted that otherwise maintain corneal transparency. The immature new blood vessels can lead to persistent inflammation and scarring, lipid exudation into the corneal tissues, and a reduction in corneal transparency, which can affect visual acuity.

==== Retinopathy of prematurity ====
Retinopathy of prematurity is a condition that occurs in premature babies. In premature babies, the retina has not completely vascularized. Rather than continuing in the normal in utero fashion, the vascularization of the retina is disrupted, leading to an abnormal proliferation of blood vessels between the areas of vascularized and avascular retina. These blood vessels grow in abnormal ways and can invade into the vitreous humor, where they can hemorrhage or cause retinal detachment in neonates.

==== Diabetic retinopathy ====
Diabetic retinopathy is an ocular pathology in diabetics which results in weakening of the retinal blood vessels. The initial nonproliferative stage is characterised by leaky vessels. As the vessel damage is repaired over time, they eventually become occluded, leading to proliferative diabetic retinopathy. The occluded capillaries create areas of ischemic retina and trigger the release of angiogenic growth factors. These growth factors stimulate the proliferation of new blood vessels from pre-existing retinal venules. It is the leading cause of blindness of working age adults.

==== Age-related macular degeneration ====
In persons who are over 65 years old, age-related macular degeneration is the leading cause of severe vision loss. A subtype of age-related macular degeneration, wet macular degeneration, is characterized by the formation of new blood vessels that originate in the choroidal vasculature and extend into the subretinal space.

==== Choroidal neovascularization ====
In ophthalmology, choroidal neovascularization is the formation of a microvasculature within the innermost layer of the choroid of the eye. Neovascularization in the eye can cause a type of glaucoma (neovascularization glaucoma) if the new blood vessels' bulk blocks the constant outflow of aqueous humour from inside the eye.

=== Cardiovascular diseases ===
Cardiovascular disease is the leading cause of death in the world. Ischemic heart disease develops when stenosis and occlusion of coronary arteries develops, leading to reduced perfusion of the cardiac tissue. Induction of neovascularization of ischemic cardiac tissues therefore has therapeutic potential.

- In atherosclerosis, new blood vessels form within plaques, contributing to their growth and instability. These vessels are often fragile, allowing inflammatory cells and fats to enter, which can cause bleeding inside the plaque and increase the risk of rupture. Some studies in animal models suggest that blocking this vessel growth can reduce atherosclerotic progression.
- In a myocardial infarction, blocked blood flow deprives heart tissue of oxygen, leading to cell damage. Neovascularization in the surrounding area can help restore oxygen supply and limit further injury. Growth factors such as basic fibroblast growth factor (bFGF) and brain natriuretic peptide (BNP) can promote angiogenesis after an acute MI.
- Following a stroke, ischemic penumbra (the region surrounding the infarct core) can disrupt the cerebral blood flow. Post-stroke angiogenesis in the area helps restore perfusion and supports neurological recovery. Additionally, arteriogenesis contributes to post-stroke blood flow restoration. Various immune cells and cytokines play a role in regulating angiogenesis after ischemic injury.

=== Wound healing ===
Vascularization is crucial for wound healing, as it provides oxygen and nutrients necessary for tissue repair. Angiogenesis temporarily increases vascular density around the wound, aiding the healing process.

Vascular endothelial growth factor (VEGF) is a key pro-angiogenic factor in this process, stimulating both vasculogenesis and angiogenesis in the skin. Impaired angiogenesis can result in delayed wound healing, as seen in conditions such as diabetes, where chronic wounds often exhibit reduced levels of active VEGF. Therapeutic stimulation of angiogenesis is being explored to speed up healing, especially in persistent wounds.

== See also ==
- Choroidal neovascularization
- Corneal neovascularization
- Revascularization
- Rubeosis iridis
- Inosculation
- Vascular remodelling in the embryo
- Vasculogenic mimicry
