= LYL1 =

Protein-coding gene in the species Homo sapiens

Identifiers
- Aliases: LYL1, bHLHa18, lymphoblastic leukemia associated hematopoiesis regulator 1, basic helix-loop-helix family member, LYL1 basic helix-loop-helix family member
- External IDs: OMIM: 151440; MGI: 96891; GeneCards: LYL1

Gene location (Human)
Chr.	Chromosome 19 (human)
Band	19p13.13	Start	13,099,033 bp
Band	19p13.13	End	13,103,161 bp

Gene location (Mouse)
Chr.	Chromosome 8 (mouse)
Band	8 C3|8 41.02 cM	Start	85,428,078 bp
Band	8 C3|8 41.02 cM	End	85,431,569 bp
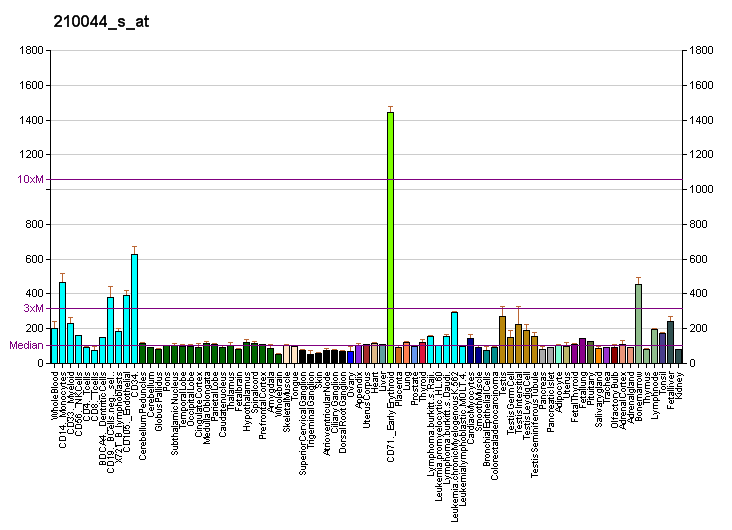
RNA expression pattern
Bgee	Human / Mouse (ortholog); Top expressed in: blood; granulocyte; monocyte; trabecular bone; bone marrow; spleen; bone marrow cell; vena cava; superficial temporal artery; lymph node / Top expressed in: granulocyte; spleen; bone marrow; tibiofemoral joint; stroma of bone marrow; fetal liver hematopoietic progenitor cell; blood; mesenteric lymph nodes; interventricular septum; endocardial cushion; More reference expression data
BioGPS	More reference expression data
Gene ontology
Molecular function	DNA binding; RNA polymerase II transcription regulatory region sequence-specific DNA binding; protein binding; protein dimerization activity; DNA-binding transcription factor activity, RNA polymerase II-specific
Cellular component	nucleus
Biological process	positive regulation of transcription, DNA-templated; B cell differentiation; definitive hemopoiesis; regulation of transcription, DNA-templated; transcription, DNA-templated; blood vessel maturation; regulation of transcription by RNA polymerase II
Sources:Amigo / QuickGO
Orthologs
Databases	NCBI: entry; OMA: entry
Species	Human	Mouse
Entrez	4066	17095
Ensembl	ENSG00000104903	ENSMUSG00000034041
UniProt	P12980	P27792
RefSeq (mRNA)	NM_005583	NM_008535
RefSeq (protein)	NP_005574	NP_032561
Location (UCSC)	Chr 19: 13.1 – 13.1 Mb	Chr 8: 85.43 – 85.43 Mb
PubMed search
- Wikidata
View/Edit Human	View/Edit Mouse

Protein lyl-1 is a protein that in humans is encoded by the LYL1 gene.

== Interactions ==
LYL1 has been shown to interact with TCF3 and NFKB1.
