= Hemogenic endothelium =

Hemogenic endothelium or haemogenic endothelium is a special subset of endothelial cells scattered within blood vessels that can differentiate into haematopoietic cells.

The development of hematopoietic cells in the embryo proceeds sequentially from mesoderm through the hemangioblast to the hemogenic endothelium and hematopoietic progenitors. The relationship between the hemogenic endothelium and the hemangioblast is not clearly understood.

== See also ==
- Hemangioblast
- Embryo
