= Stem cell marker =

Stem cell markers are genes and their protein products used by scientists to isolate and identify stem cells. Stem cells can also be identified by functional assays. Below is a list of markers and functional assays used to identify stem cells. The initial list was obtained by minding the PubMed database.

== Stem cell marker names ==
- AA4
- AA4.1
- P-gp (CD243)
- ABCB5
- ABCG2 (CDw338)
- ALDH
- alkaline phosphatase
- alpha6-integrin
- Anti-WNT2B monoclonal antibody
- antithrombin III (AT)
- asialo GM1
- Bcl-2
- Beta-galactosidase (β-gal) of ROSA26 mice
- beta1-integrin
- bromodeoxyuridine
- c-kit (CD117)
- c-Met
- C1qR(p)
- END (CD105)
- PROM1 (CD133)
- ALCAM (CD166)
- ITGB1 (CD29)
- TNFRSF8 (CD30)
- PECAM-1 (CD31)
- Siglec-3 (CD33)
- CD34
- CD44
- NCAM (CD56)
- CD73
- CD9
- CD90
- CDCP1
- Circulating anticoagulants protein C (PC)
- CK19
- CLV3
- cyclic CMP
- ECMA-7
- EDR1
- EEC
- FGF-4
- Flk-2
- Flk1(+)
- Flt3/Flk2
- FMS (CD115)
- FORSE-1
- G alpha16
- GDF3
- GFPM
- Giant granules of beige C57B1/6 (bg) mice
- Gli2
- Gli3
- glial fibrillary acidic protein
- glycoprotein IB
- GSTA1
- HAS2 gene expression
- Her5
- hMYADM
- HSA
- hsp25
- Id2
- IL-3Ralpha
- Integrins
- interleukin-3 receptor alpha chain
- Iron oxide nanoparticles
- KDR
- Keratin 15 (a.k.a. CK15, Cytokeratin 15)
- Keratin 19 (a.k.a. CK19, Cytokeratin 19, K19)
- Kit
- L-selectin (CD62L)
- Lamin A/C
- Lewis X antigen (Le(X))
- LeX
- Lgr5
- Lrp4
- MCM2
- MCSP
- Metallothionein (MT) crypt-restricted immunopositivity indices (MTCRII)
- monosomy 7
- Mouse orthologue of ARX
- MRP4
- Msi-1
- Musashi
- Musashi-1
- Mutant BCRP
- nestin
- neurofilament microtubule-associated protein 2
- neuron-glial antigen 2 (NG2)
- notch 1
- nrp-1
- Nucleostemin
- OC.3
- Oct-4
- OST-PTP
- P-gp/MDR1
- p21
- p63
- p75
- PCLP
- PCNA
- PECAM
- PgP-1
- phosphorylating-p38
- Podocalyxin
- procalcitonin (PCT)
- PSCs
- pSV2gpt
- PTPRC
- purified LRC
- Rat liver fatty acid-binding protein/human growth hormone transgenes (Fabpl/hGH)
- RC1 antigen
- Rex-1
- Sca-1
- SCF
- Sialyl-lactotetra
- Side Population (SP)
- SOX10
- SOX2
- SOX9
- SP phenotype
- SSEA-1
- SSEA-3
- SSEA-4
- Stat3
- Stat5
- Stella
- Stra8
- Stro-1
- Tartrate-resistant acid phosphatase (TRAcP)
- TdT
- telomerase reverse transcriptase
- electrophoretic pattern of hemoglobin
- Thrombomucin
- Thy-1
- Tra-1-60
- TWIST1
- VEGFR-2
- vimentin
- X-Smoothened
- XKrk1
- Zac1
