= Techniques to isolate haematopoietic stem cells =

Since haematopoietic stem cells cannot be isolated as a pure population, it is not possible to identify them under a microscope. Therefore, there are many techniques to isolate haematopoietic stem cells (HSCs). HSCs can be identified or isolated by the use of flow cytometry where the combination of several different cell surface markers is used to separate the rare HSCs from the surrounding blood cells. HSCs lack expression of mature blood cell markers and are thus, called Lin-. Lack of expression of lineage markers is used in combination with detection of several positive cell-surface markers to isolate HSCs. In addition, HSCs are characterized by their small size and low staining with vital dyes such as rhodamine 123 (rhodamine ^{lo}) or Hoechst 33342 (side population).

CD34+ Cells can be isolated by 4 different techniques from peripheral blood samples

1. By magnetic beads with MACS
2. By FACS
3. By labelled anti-antibodies
4. Manually by culture. Since CD34 are in suspension culture and almost all cells in PBMC gets adhered, CD34 can be isolated through this process

== Cluster of differentiation and other markers ==
The classical marker of human HSC is CD34 first described independently by Civin et al. and Tindle et al. It is used to isolate HSC for reconstitution of patients who are haematologically incompetent as a result of chemotherapy or disease.

Many markers belong to the cluster of differentiation series, like: CD34, CD38, CD90, CD133, CD105, CD45, and also c-kit – the receptor for stem cell factor.

There are many differences between the human and murine hematopoietic cell markers for the commonly accepted type of hematopoietic stem cells.

- Mouse HSC: EMCN^{+}, CD34^{lo/−}, SCA-1^{+}, Thy1.1^{+/lo}, CD38^{+}, C-kit^{+}, lin^{−}
- Human HSC: EMCN^{+}, CD34^{+}, CD59^{+}, Thy1/CD90^{+}, CD38^{lo/−}, C-kit/CD117^{+}, lin^{−}

However, not all stem cells are covered by these combinations that, nonetheless, have become popular. In fact, even in humans, there are hematopoietic stem cells that are CD34^{−}/CD38^{−}. Also some later studies suggested that earliest stem cells may lack c-kit on the cell surface. For human HSCs use of CD133 was one step ahead as both CD34^{+} and CD34^{−} HSCs were CD133^{+}.

Traditional purification method used to yield a reasonable purity level of mouse hematopoietic stem cells, in general, requires a large (~10–12) battery of markers, most of which were surrogate markers with little functional significance, and thus partial overlap with the stem cell populations and sometimes other closely related cells that are not stem cells. Also, some of these markers (e.g., Thy1) are not conserved across mouse species, and use of markers like CD34^{−} for HSC purification requires mice to be at least 8 weeks old.

== SLAM code ==
Alternative methods that could give rise to a similar or better harvest of stem cells is an active area of research, and are presently emerging. One such method uses a signature of SLAM family cell surface molecules. The SLAM (Signaling lymphocyte activation molecule) family is a group of more than 10 molecules whose genes are located mostly tandemly in a single locus on chromosome 1 (mouse), all belonging to a subset of the immunoglobulin gene superfamily, and originally thought to be involved in T-cell stimulation. This family includes CD48, CD150, CD244, etc., CD150 being the founding member, and, thus, also known as slamF1, i.e., SLAM family member 1.

The signature SLAM codes for the hemopoietic hierarchy are:

- Hematopoietic stem cells (HSC): CD150^{+}CD48^{−}CD244^{−}
- Multipotent progenitor cells (MPPs): CD150^{−}CD48^{−}CD244^{+}
- Lineage-restricted progenitor cells (LRPs): CD150^{−}CD48^{+}CD244^{+}
- Common myeloid progenitor (CMP): lin^{−}SCA-1^{−}c-kit^{+}CD34^{+}CD16/32^{mid}
- Granulocyte-macrophage progenitor (GMP): lin^{−}SCA-1^{−}c-kit^{+}CD34^{+}CD16/32^{hi}
- Megakaryocyte-erythroid progenitor (MEP): lin^{−}SCA-1^{−}c-kit^{+}CD34^{−}CD16/32^{low}

For HSCs, CD150^{+}CD48^{−} was sufficient instead of CD150^{+}CD48^{−}CD244^{−} because CD48 is a ligand for CD244, and both would be positive only in the activated lineage-restricted progenitors. It seems that this code was more efficient than the more tedious earlier set of the large number of markers, and are also conserved across the mouse strains; however, recent work has shown that this method excludes a large number of HSCs and includes an equally large number of non-stem cells. CD150^{+}CD48^{−} gave stem cell purity comparable to Thy1^{lo}SCA-1^{+}lin^{−}c-kit^{+} in mice.

== LT-HSC/ST-HSC/early MPP/late MPP ==
Irving Weissman's group at Stanford University was the first to isolate mouse hematopoietic stem cells in 1986 and was also the first to work out the markers to distinguish the mouse long-term (LT-HSC) and short-term (ST-HSC) hematopoietic stem cells (self-renew-capable), and the Multi-potent progenitors (MPP, low or no self-renew capability – the later the developmental stage of MPP, the lesser the self-renewal ability and the more of some of the markers like CD4 and CD135):

- LT-HSC: CD34^{−}, CD38^{−}, SCA-1^{+}, Thy1.1^{+/lo}, C-kit^{+}, lin^{−}, CD135^{−}, Slamf1/CD150^{+}
- ST-HSC: CD34^{+}, CD38^{+}, SCA-1^{+}, Thy1.1^{+/lo}, C-kit^{+}, lin^{−}, CD135^{−}, Slamf1/CD150^{+}, Mac-1 (CD11b)^{lo}
- Early MPP: CD34^{+}, SCA-1^{+}, Thy1.1^{−}, C-kit^{+}, lin^{−}, CD135^{+}, Slamf1/CD150^{−}, Mac-1 (CD11b)^{lo}, CD4^{lo}
- Late MPP: CD34^{+}, SCA-1^{+}, Thy1.1^{−}, C-kit^{+}, lin^{−}, CD135^{high}, Slamf1/CD150^{−}, Mac-1 (CD11b)^{lo}, CD4^{lo}
