= Endothelial colony forming cell =

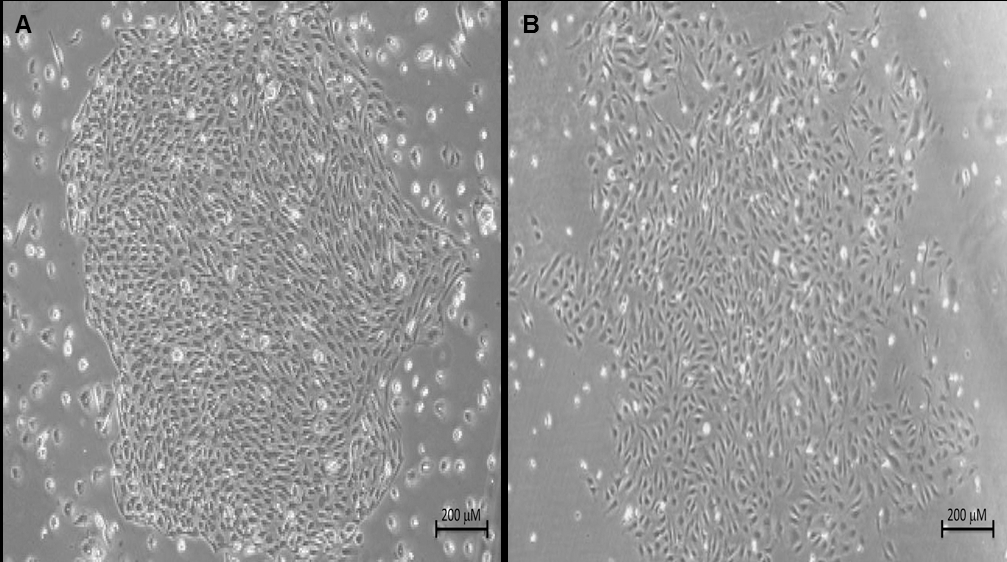
Representative photomicrograph (40X magnification) of colonies formed by ECFCs in cultures of MNCs obtained from peripheral blood after 14 days in culture. (A) controls and (B) patients with history of VTD (Venous thrombosis.

Endothelial colony forming cells (or ECFCs) are adult endothelial progenitor cells capable of differentiating to regenerate endothelial cell populations. They are residents of adult vasculature and are also thought to migrate to areas of injury as one form of circulating endothelial cell. They are thought to play a critical role in vascular healing after injury as well as developmental angiogenesis.

== Characteristics ==
ECFCs are commercially available and phenotypically identified by the positive markers CD34, CD31, VEGFR2, eNOS, CD105, and vWF. They also must test negative for CD133, CD45, and CD117. ECFCs are named for their ability to form colonies of cells which progress rapidly to capillary-like networks in vitro when cultured in biopolymer matrix, and in vivo.

In 2019, a position paper from the International Society on Thrombosis and Haemostasis (ISTH) Vascular Biology Scientific and Standardization Committee (SSC) described a standardized protocol for the isolation and culture of endothelial colony-forming cells (ECFCs) in humans. This was followed in 2023 by a publication surveying laboratory practices among teams working with these cells, conducted under the auspices of the ISTH SSC. Patient-derived ECFCs are often used as a cellular model to study the pathogenic mechanisms of Von Willebrand Disease, angiodysplasia and other bleeding disorders.

A 2025 review emphasized the unique vasculogenic and immunomodulatory properties of cord blood-derived ECFCs (CB-ECFCs), highlighting their high proliferative capacity, immune-privileged profile, and therapeutic potential in vascular regeneration and tissue engineering.

In 2022, it was proposed that ECFCs may originate from very small embryonic-like stem cells.

=== Proliferative potential ===
A hierarchy has been demonstrated to exist within ECFC populations with regard to proliferative potential. Certain cells within the heterogeneous group of colony forming cells are demonstrated to reach significantly higher population doublings, and retain high levels of telomerase activity. These have been termed high proliferative potential endothelial colony forming cells, or HPP-ECFCs. In contrast, other cells that fit the phenotypic profile for an ECFC but do not maintain the same level of activity are LPP-ECFCs.

Vascular endothelial stem cells have been defined as rare endothelial colony forming cells with extremely high proliferative potential. They have been identified by marker analysis as lin- (lineage negative) CD31+, CD105+, Sca-1+, CD117 (ckit)+ and thought have the ability to generate functional vasculature from single cells.

== Medical use ==
ECFCs have been shown to decline in number and clonal ability with age or peripheral arterial disease, though are increased with acute myocardial infarction. A low number of ECFCs has been identified as a risk factor for infant diseases such as bronchopulmonary dysplasia. ECFCs can become dysfunctional in gestational diabetes (rescued by Vitamin D administration), smoking (driven by DNA damage), and premature birth (driven by decreased expression of histone deacetylase SIRT1). ECFCs are thus thought to have a large potential in therapies for vasculopathies of various etiologies.

ECFC-like cells have also been generated from pluripotent stem cells, perhaps eliminating the need for direct harvesting of the cells for future use.

== See also ==
- List of human cell types derived from the germ layers
