= Endothelial progenitor cell =

Cell type

Endothelial progenitor cell (or EPC) is a term that has been applied to multiple different cell types that play roles in the regeneration of the endothelial lining of blood vessels. Outgrowth endothelial cells are an EPC subtype committed to endothelial cell formation. Despite the history and controversy, the EPC in all its forms remains a promising target of regenerative medicine research.

== History and controversy ==
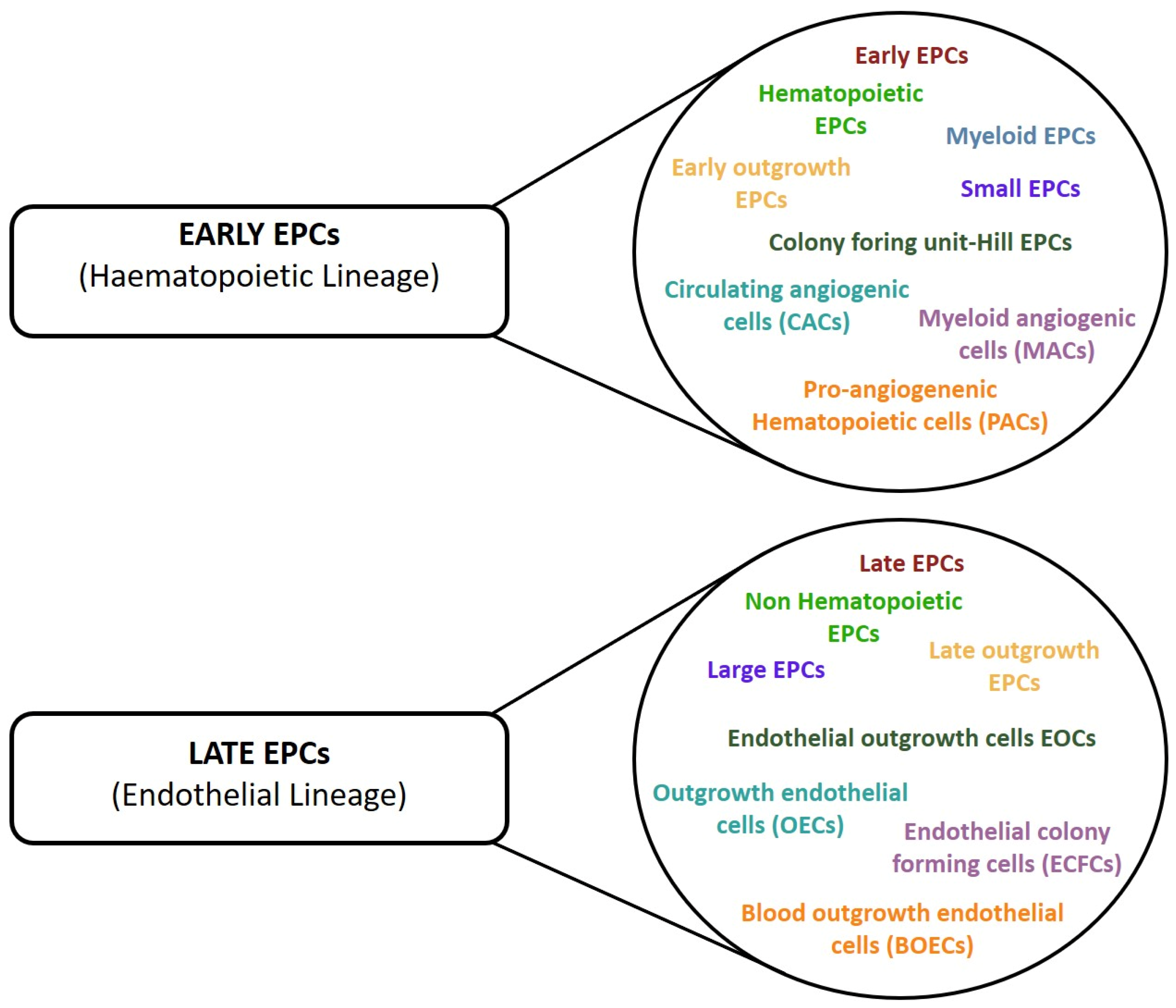
Different nomenclature used in the studies to define cells with pro-angiogenic properties. The cells have been divided into two group according to their lineage phenotype

Developmentally, the endothelium arises in close contact with the hematopoietic system. This, and the existence of hemogenic endothelium, led to a belief and search for adult hemangioblast- or angioblast-like cells; cells which could give rise to functional vasculature in adults. The existence of endothelial progenitor cells has been posited since the mid-twentieth century, however their existence was not confirmed until the 1990s when Asahara et al. published the discovery of the first putative EPC.

Recently, controversy has developed over the definition of true endothelial progenitors. Although bone marrow-derived cells do appear to localize to injured vessels and promote an angiogenic switch, other studies have suggested these cells do not contribute directly to the functional endothelium, instead acting via paracrine methods to provide support for the resident endothelial cells. While some other authors have contested these, and maintained that they are true EPCs, many investigators have begun to term these cells colony forming unit-Hill cells (CFU-Hill) or circulating angiogenic cells (CAC) instead (depending on the method of isolation), highlighting their role as hematopoietic myeloid cells involved in promoting new vessel growth.

Molecular genetic analysis of early outgrowth putative EPC populations suggests they do indeed have monocyte-like expression patterns, and support the existence of a separate population of progenitors, the late outgrowth, or endothelial colony forming cell (ECFC). Furthermore, early outgrowth cells maintain other monocyte functions such as high Dil-Ac-LDL and India ink uptake and low eNOS expression. These original, early outgrowth, CFU-Hill or CACs are also shown to express CD14, a lipopolysaccharide receptor expressed by monocytes but not endothelial cells.

Endothelial colony forming cells represent a distinct population that has been found to have the potential to differentiate and promote vessel repair. ECFCs are now known to be tissue-resident progenitor cells in adults that maintain some vasculogenic ability.

== Classifications ==
By method of isolation and cell function, three main populations of putative adult EPCs have been described. The behavior of the cells can be found in the following table.

Behaviour .. \\ .. Population	Colony forming unit – Hill	Circulating angiogenic cell	Endothelial colony forming cell
Clonal proliferative status	-	-	+
Replating ability	-	-	+
In vitro tube formation	+/-	+/-	+
In vivo de novo vessel formation	-	-	+
Homing to ischemic sites in vivo	+	+	+
Paracrine support of angiogenesis	+	+	+

EPCs also have variable phenotypic markers used for identification. Unfortunately, there are no unique markers for endothelial progenitors that are not shared with other endothelial or hematopoietic cells, which has contributed to the historical controversy surrounding the field. A detailed overview of current markers can be found in the following table.

Marker .. \\ .. Population	Colony forming unit – Hill	Circulating angiogenic cell	Endothelial colony forming cell
CD34 expression	+/-	+/-	+/-
CD133 expression	+	+	-
CD45 expression	+/-	+/-	-
CD146 expression	+/-	+/-	+
VE-cadherin expression	+/-	+/-	++
CD115 expression	+	+	-
CD31 (PECAM) expression	+	+	+
CD14 expression	+	+	-
CD105 expression	+	+	+
CD117 (ckit) expression	+	+	+/-
VEGFR1 expression	+	+	+
VEGFR2 (KDR/Flk1) expression	+	+	++
TIE-2 expression	+	+	+
CXCR4 expression	+	+	+/-
von Willebrand factor expression	+/-	+/-	+
ALDH	Bright	Bright	Bright
acLDL uptake	+	+	+

=== Colony forming unit – Hill ===
As originally isolated by Asahara et al., the CFU-Hill population is an early outgrowth, formed by plating peripheral blood mononuclear cells on fibronectin-coated dishes, allowing adhesion and depleting non-adherent cells, and isolating discrete colonies.

=== Circulating angiogenic cell ===
A similar method is to culture the peripheral blood mononuclear fraction in supplemented endothelial growth medium, removing the non-adherent cells, and isolating the remaining. While these cells display some endothelial characteristics, they do not form colonies.

=== Endothelial colony forming cell ===
Endothelial colony forming cells are a late outgrowth cell type; that is, they are only isolated after significantly longer culture than CFU-Hill cells. ECFCs are isolated by plating peripheral blood mononuclear fraction on collagen-coated plates, removing non-adherent cells, and culturing for weeks until the emergence of colonies with a distinctive cobblestone morphology. These cells are phenotypically similar to endothelial cells and have been shown to create vessel-like structures in vitro and in vivo.

In 2019, David Smadja described a standardized protocol for the isolation and culture of endothelial colony-forming cells (ECFCs) in humans. This was followed in 2023 by a publication surveying laboratory practices among teams working with these cells, conducted under the auspices of the International Society on Thrombosis and Haemostasis Vascular Biology Scientific Subcommittee. In 2025, a review emphasized the unique vasculogenic and immunomodulatory properties of cord blood-derived ECFCs (CB-ECFCs), highlighting their high proliferative capacity, immune-privileged status, and therapeutic potential in vascular regeneration and tissue engineering.

== Development ==
Certain developmental cells may be similar to or the same as other endothelial progenitors, though not typically referred to as EPCs. Hemangioblasts (or their in vitro counterpart, blast-colony forming cells) are cells believed to give rise to both the endothelial and hematopoietic systems during early development. Angioblasts are believed to be a form of early progenitor or stem cell which gives rise to the endothelium alone. More recently, mesoangioblasts have been theorized as a cell giving rise to multiple mesodermal tissues.

In 2022, it was proposed that endothelial colony-forming cells (ECFCs) may originate from very small embryonic-like stem cells (VSELs).

== Function ==
=== Role in tumor growth ===
Endothelial progenitor cells are likely important in tumour growth and are thought to be critical for metastasis and the angiogenesis. A large amount of research has been done on CFU-Hill bone marrow-derived putative EPCs. Ablation of the endothelial progenitor cells in the bone marrow lead to a significant decrease in tumour growth and vasculature development. This indicates that endothelial progenitor cells present novel therapeutic targets. Inhibitor of DNA Binding 1 (ID1) has been used as a marker for these cells; this allows for tracking EPCs from the bone marrow to the blood to the tumour-stroma and even incorporated in tumour vasculature.

Recently it has been found that miRNAs regulate EPC biology and tumour angiogenesis. This work by Plummer et al. found that in particular targeting of the miRNAs miR-10b and miR-196b led to significant defects in angiogenesis-mediated tumor growth by decreasing the mobilization of proangiogenic EPCs to the tumour. These findings indicate that directed targeting these miRNAs in EPCs may result in a novel strategy for inhibiting tumor angiogenesis.

Studies have shown ECFCs and human umbilical vein endothelial cells (HUVECs) to have a capacity for tumor migration and neoangiogenesis even greater than that of other CD34+ hematopoietic cells when implanted in immunodeficient mice, suggesting the endothelial progenitors play a key role, but further supporting the importance of both cell types as targets for pharmacological therapy.

=== Role in cardiovascular disease ===
Higher levels of circulating "endothelial progenitor cells" were detected in the bloodstream of patients, predicted better outcomes, and patients experienced fewer repeat heart attacks, though statistical correlations between these outcomes and circulating endothelial progenitor cell numbers were scant in the original research. Endothelial progenitor cells are mobilized after a myocardial infarction, and that they function to restore the lining of blood vessels that are damaged during the heart attack.

A number of small phase clinical trials have begun to point to EPCs as a potential treatment for various cardiovascular diseases (CVDs). For instance, the year long "Transplantation of Progenitor Cells and Regeneration Enhancement in Acute Myocardial Infarction" (TOPCARE-AMI) studied the therapeutic effect of infusing ex-vivo expanded bone marrow EPCs and culture enriched EPCs derived from peripheral blood into 20 patients with acute myocardial infarction (MI). After four months, significant enhancements were found in ventricular ejection fraction, cardiac geometry, coronary blood flow reserve, and myocardial viability (Shantsila, Watson, & Lip). A similar study looked at the therapeutic effects of EPCs on leg ischemia caused by severe peripheral artery disease. The study injected a sample of EPC rich blood into the gastrocnemius muscles of 25 patients. After 24 weeks an increased number of collateral vessels and improved recovery in blood perfusion was observed. Rest pain and pain-free walking were also noted to have improved

=== Role in wound healing ===
The role of endothelial progenitor cells in wound healing remains unclear. Blood vessels have been seen entering ischemic tissue in a process driven by mechanically forced ingress of existing capillaries into the avascular region, and importantly, instead of through sprouting angiogenesis. These observations contradict sprouting angiogenesis driven by EPCs. Taken together with the inability to find bone-marrow derived endothelium in new vasculature, there is now little material support for postnatal vasculogenesis. Instead, angiogenesis is likely driven by a process of physical force.

=== Role in endometriosis ===
In endometriosis, it appears that up to 37% of the microvascular endothelium of the ectopic endometrial tissue originates from endothelial progenitor cells.

== See also ==
- EndoMac progenitor cell
- List of human cell types derived from the germ layers
