= ECFC =

ECFC may refer to one of the following football (soccer) clubs:

- Exeter City F.C., an English football club
- Elgin City F.C., a Scottish football club
- Edinburgh City F.C., a Scottish football club
  - Edinburgh City F.C. (1928), a Scottish former football club
- East Craigie F.C., a Scottish football club
- Ethiopian Coffee FC, an Ethiopian football club
- Electric City FC, a Canadian soccer club

ECFC could also refer to the:

- Eastern Collegiate Football Conference
- Enlisted Career Force Controls
- Endothelial colony forming cell
