= Host response to cancer therapy =

The host response to cancer therapy is defined as a physiological response of the non-malignant cells of the body (also known as host cells) to a specific cancer therapy. The response is therapy-specific, occurring independently of cancer type or stage.

== Background ==
All cancer treatment modalities (e.g., chemotherapy, targeted drugs, radiation and surgery) trigger systemic and local effects in the treated subject (i.e., the host). These include a rapid elevation in the levels of circulating cytokines, chemokines, growth factors and enzymes accompanied by acute mobilization and tumor homing of bone-marrow derived cells. These therapy-induced effects have the potential to facilitate tumor growth and spread, counteracting the beneficial effects of therapy. Thus, the host response to cancer therapy creates a paradoxical situation in which the desired therapeutic effect of treatment is reduced by its side effect on host cells. The balance between these two opposing activities determines the overall efficacy and outcome of treatment.

== Host response to different treatment modalities for cancer ==
=== Host response to chemotherapy ===
Chemotherapies, including alkylating agents, microtubule inhibitors, antimetabolites and antibiotics, represent a major systemic therapeutic modality for many cancers. These agents induce death in rapidly dividing cells thus targeting tumor cells, but at the same time damaging healthy tissue. Consequently, non-malignant host cells activate wound healing and inflammatory mechanisms to repair chemotherapy-induced damage. These repair mechanisms have the potential to exacerbate tumor promoting processes such as angiogenesis and metastasis. In mouse tumor models, different chemotherapy types induce a rapid mobilization of circulating endothelial progenitor cells that home to the tumor site where they promote angiogenesis. In addition, a variety of immune cell types, such as myeloid progenitors and macrophages, are recruited to the tumor site in a chemotherapy-dependent manner, an effect that enhances metastasis.

=== Host response to radiation therapy ===
Radiotherapy is a well-established treatment modality for several cancer types. However, relapses after radiotherapy are often more aggressive and associated with poor prognosis. Cumulative evidence shows that the host response to radiotherapy is a contributing factor to this effect. Tumors implanted in pre-irradiated tissue grow with slower kinetics, however, paradoxically exhibit enhanced invasive and metastatic properties, a phenomenon known as the "tumor bed effect". This enhanced aggressiveness is attributed to radiation-induced modifications of the tumor microenvironment, including enhanced angiogenesis and recruitment of pro-metastatic bone marrow cells and macrophages

=== Host response to anti-angiogenic drugs ===
Anti-angiogenic drugs (or angiogenesis inhibitors) target the blood vessels required for tumor survival. The rationale behind this strategy is to starve the tumor of oxygen and nutrients, limiting its ability to grow. However, tumor hypoxia that ensues activates a range of compensatory mechanisms that sustain vascularization, leading to resistance to the anti-angiogenic drug. Many of these compensatory mechanisms involve host cells. For example, treating tumor-bearing mice with vascular-disrupting agents (that specifically target tumor-associated vessels) triggers an acute mobilization of circulating endothelial progenitor cells that home to tumor margins where they facilitate revascularization. In addition, various types of pro-angiogenic bone marrow-derived cells such as myeloid-derived suppressor cells, tumor-associated macrophages, and TIE2-expressing monocytes contribute to therapy resistance. In mouse tumor models, anti-angiogenic therapy causes an elevation in tumor-promoting cytokines and growth factors that in turn augment the invasive and metastatic potential of tumors.

=== Host response to surgery ===
Surgical resection of a tumor is one of the primary treatment modalities for cancer and can be curative especially for patients with early disease. However, there is evidence that tumor resection generates a permissive environment for tumor growth, in part, via host-mediated processes. As part of the wound healing process, surgical tissue trauma is rapidly followed by a cascade of inflammatory processes. Many of the growth factors, cytokines, extracellular matrix-modifying enzymes, and immune cells released during this process may also promote proliferation of residual tumor cells, angiogenesis and metastasis. For example, lungs are more prone to metastatic seeding after a surgical incision in the abdominal region of mice. This effect is due to increased expression and activity of lysyl oxidase (LOX), an extracellular matrix remodeling enzyme produced at the hypoxic surgical site. In clinical settings, elevated levels of circulating endothelial progenitor cells, bone marrow-derived cells as well as circulating factors with known roles in angiogenesis and tumor progression have been reported in response to major surgery in comparison to minimal surgery.

== Clinical implications ==
Characterizing the host response to cancer therapy in patients has clinical implications especially in the field of personalized medicine (also known as precision medicine) and biomarker discovery. Experimental studies have shown that combining conventional cancer therapies with agents that selectively block therapy-induced factors improves treatment efficacies.
