= David Smadja =

French hematologist and virologist

- Born: February 25, 1978 (age 48); Clermont-Ferrand, France
- Scientific career
- Fields: Hematology, Hemostasis, Thrombosis, Endothelial progenitor cells, COVID-19, Long covid, Cardiovascular disease
- Workplaces: Inserm, AP-HP (Greater Paris University Hospitals), Hôpital Européen Georges-Pompidou, Université Paris Cité, Résiste association, Laboratoire de la République think tank

David M. Smadja (born February 25, 1978, in Clermont Ferrand, France) is a French hematologist working as a hospital practitioner in Georges Pompidou European Hospital, part of the AP-HP, and Paris Cité University. He specializes in hemostasis, thrombosis and vascular biology. Smadja has contributed to research on vascular and coagulation disorders associated to COVID-19 and long COVID during the global pandemic.

== Education and career ==
In 2005, he obtained his Diploma of Specialized Studies in Medical biology specialized in hematology from Paris Descartes University. In 2006, he completed his PhD in Basic Sciences at the same university. From 2010 to 2012, he served as a research fellow in the Vascular Biology Program at Harvard Medical School, within the Department of Surgery at Boston Children's Hospital in the United States.

He is currently a university professor at Paris Cité University and a hospital practitioner in the hematology department of the Georges Pompidou European Hospital, part of AP-HP.

His professional roles also include co-chairing the vascular biology session of the International Society on Thrombosis and Haemostasis (2018–2022), and serving as a member of both the scientific council and the board of directors of INNOVTE (Investigation Network On Venous Thrombo-Embolism). INNOVTE is a national network, accredited by F-CRIN, dedicated to advancing clinical and translational research, as well as European-scale studies on venous thromboembolic disease (VTE).

From 2019 to 2021, Smadja served as the director of the Bio-Surgical Research Laboratory at the Carpentier Foundation, where he managed the large animal platform facility. Since 2021, he has served as an associate editor for Stem Cell Reviews and Reports and is a member of the editorial board for the Angiogenesis journal. He previously served on the editorial board of Arteriosclerosis, Thrombosis, and Vascular Biology.

In 2005, he received an award from the French National Society of Hemostasis and Thrombosis for his research on thrombin activation in endothelial progenitor cells.

He is also involved in efforts to combat health and science misinformation as the head of the health group within the Laboratoire de la République, a French think tank founded by former education minister Jean-Michel Blanquer and dedicated to promoting republican values in France. One of the stated objectives of this health commission is to restore public trust in scientific and medical institutions and to respond to narratives that challenge the legitimacy of science.

Smadja serves as vice president of Résiste, a French association focused on combating school bullying and cyberbullying. The organization works closely with local governments and educational stakeholders to implement awareness campaigns, preventive actions, and support for victims throughout France.

== Research ==
David Smadja's research primarily focuses on the circulating endothelial compartment, with an emphasis on the role of endothelial cells—both mature and progenitor cells— and protein biomarkers in the diagnosis, therapy, and regeneration. His work explores the role of endothelial cells in medical applications, including their potential as diagnostic tools, therapeutic targets, or agents in regenerative medicine.

=== Endothelial progenitor cells and vascular regeneration ===
The discovery of adult endothelial progenitor cells (EPCs) in 1997 was a key advancement in vascular biology, opening new possibilities for treating vascular diseases through cell therapy. During his PhD, David Smadja delved into the study of EPCs, focusing on their characterization and role in vessel formation. He explored how these cells interact with the coagulation system, particularly with thrombin and thrombospondin. His research provided insights into how EPCs contribute to ischemia, vascular repair and vessel regeneration.

Smadja also played a role in the OPTIPEC trial, a cell therapy trials for critical limb ischemia. This study demonstrated that injecting bone marrow into distal tissues of the lower limb could stimulate a neoangiogenic process.

After two years at Harvard Medical School in Joyce Bischoff's lab in Boston, where he studied how stem cells contribute to vascular formation in infantile hemangioma, David Smadja returned to Paris in 2012 to explore the ontogeny of the endothelial lineage. Despite the growing interest in endothelial colony-forming cells (ECFCs), their tissue and molecular origins remained unclear. In 2015, Smadja's work led to the discovery that very small embryonic-like stem cells (VSELs), specifically from CD133-positive cells in humans, could give rise to endothelial cells. Later, in collaboration with the University of Louisville, he demonstrated that CD34+ VSELs could differentiate into the vasculogenic subtype of EPCs, known as ECFCs. Smadja authored the first international consensus paper on the technical methods for isolating and cultivating ECFCs. In 2023, he proposed a second consensus paper based on an international survey of practices in endothelial progenitor cell culture, reinforcing his contributions to the field.

In 2023, under the leadership of Nicolas Fortunel, a research director at the Commissariat à l'Énergie Atomique, David Smadja's team received the "FRANCE 2030 PEPR Biotherapies" grant for the "Bioengineered Skin France" project. The project aims to enhance skin graft technology by boosting the regenerative capacity of grafts, primarily by increasing stem cell content and incorporating prerevascularization strategies with ECFCs, while also focusing on reducing graft rejection.

=== COVID-19 as an acquired vascular disorder ===
==== Role of endothelial cells in human lung diseases ====
In the late 2000s, David Smadja and his team proposed that the pulmonary endothelium is an active organ in pulmonary diseases, particularly in pulmonary hypertension (PH) and idiopathic pulmonary fibrosis (IPF), marked by the destruction of alveolar architecture. In the context of PH, Smadja introduced circulating endothelial cells (CECs) as a clinical biomarker to evaluate the reversibility of PH in congenital heart disease and as an indicator of patient response to vasodilator treatments. In IPF, Smadja's research provided insights into the underlying vascular dysfunction, including the recruitment of neutrophils in the absence of infection due to endothelial disorders, particularly an increased senescent and prothrombotic profile of endothelial cells. His work demonstrated that ECFCs are significantly decreased in stable IPF patients.

In early 2020, with the emergence of SARS-CoV-2 and the onset of the COVID-19 pandemic, David Smadja recognized the potential impact of the virus on vascular health and began investigating the associated endothelial dysfunction, or endotheliopathy, and the related coagulopathy in COVID-19 patients. His research aimed to understand how the virus triggers widespread vascular damage, leading to abnormal blood clotting, a hallmark of severe COVID-19 cases. Recognizing the urgency of the situation, he submitted a research proposal to study these phenomena and was awarded one of the first grants from the French Ministry of Research in March 2020 for SARCODO Study.

This early funding allowed him to investigate the mechanisms by which SARS-CoV-2 disrupts the vascular system, focusing on how endothelial injury contributes to the severe clotting complications seen in COVID-19, such as microvascular thrombosis. His work provided insights into the vascular aspects of COVID-19 and highlighted the importance of understanding endothelial health in managing the disease. By exploring both the endothelial dysfunction and the resulting coagulopathy, Smadja contributed to the growing body of research that underscores the systemic nature of COVID-19, beyond its initial respiratory presentation. According to a paper published in Heliyon, he has been cited worldwide as the number one researcher in this field. His work advanced understanding of how COVID-19 affects blood clotting mechanisms and related vascular disorders.

David Smadja's contributions helped in advancing treatments and management strategies for patients facing complications related to vascular dysfunction, particularly through the use of anticoagulation therapies. Notably, during the first wave of the COVID-19 pandemic in 2020, Smadja, in collaboration with the French Society of Cardiology, demonstrated that patients who were already on oral anticoagulation for other medical conditions experienced less severe forms of COVID-19. This early observation led to the hypothesis that anticoagulation might play a protective role in COVID-19. Subsequent large-scale clinical and randomized trials confirmed this hypothesis, showing that early anticoagulation could mitigate the severity of COVID-19 by addressing the coagulation disorders associated with the disease.

==== COVID-19 vaccination ====
In March 2021, when the first cases of thrombosis were suspected following COVID-19 vaccinations, the World Health Organization's pharmacovigilance department tasked David Smadja with assessing the risk of thrombosis after vaccination. His evaluation revealed that the rate of reported thrombotic events following the administration of three vaccines—Pfizer-BioNTech, Moderna, and AstraZeneca—was extremely low, confirming the rarity of such adverse effects. While a few cases of thrombosis following the AstraZeneca vaccine exhibited an atypical profile, the safety of mRNA vaccines was widely confirmed. Smadja's team published a report on a fatal case of vaccine-induced immune thrombotic thrombocytopenia (VITT) following AstraZeneca vaccination in France, contributing to the understanding of this rare complication.

David Smadja strongly advocated for widespread COVID-19 vaccination, emphasizing its importance for controlling the pandemic. Alongside a French lawyer, he supported making vaccination legally mandatory, proposing that unvaccinated individuals face restrictions in public spaces. Smadja argued that mass vaccination was both a public health necessity and a moral responsibility to protect vulnerable populations and relieve healthcare systems. This stance attracted significant attention and debate, especially when French President Emmanuel Macron introduced the vaccine pass, requiring proof of vaccination for access to public venues. Smadja and other experts stressed the importance of vaccination in controlling the virus, especially with more transmissible variants emerging.

==== Long COVID-19 could be a vascular disorder ====
In 2023, David Smadja's team highlighted a significant link between the pulmonary forms of long COVID and a marker associated with abnormal blood vessel formation: VEGF-A (vascular endothelial growth factor A). The various symptoms and biological profile of long COVID clearly show that there are very different clinical and biological entities. This discovery opened up new avenues for the treatment of long COVID symptoms, particularly those affecting the lungs. It led to the launch of the first therapeutic trial for long COVID, funded by the French PHRC (Programme Hospitalier de Recherche Clinique) for infectious diseases in 2024. David Smadja has also been a strong advocate for the recognition that long COVID is not a single condition but rather a collection of multiple, distinct diseases. His work emphasizes the need for a more nuanced understanding of the varied manifestations of long COVID in order to develop more targeted treatments and management strategies.

=== Heart valve and hemocompatibility of biomaterials ===
David Smadja has contributed to research on the hemocompatibility of the Carmat Aeson® total artificial heart, a pulsatile artificial heart designed for patients with biventricular heart failure. The Aeson® heart's includes hemodynamics that closely mimic natural heart function, a hybrid membrane, and bioprosthetic valves made from bovine pericardium, in which are intended to ensure compatibility with the body's circulatory system. Smadja's research demonstrated that the Aeson® heart does not lead to any signs of acquired von Willebrand syndrome, nor other biological or clinical issues indicating poor hemocompatibility, such as hemolysis or thrombosis. Additionally, his work revealed the endothelialization of the ventricular membrane, which likely contributes to the device's low anticoagulation requirements.

In a letter published in the New England Journal of Medicine, David Smadja proposed that a crucial factor in preventing thrombosis in bioprosthetic materials is the use of short-term and targeted contact-phase inhibition. He later demonstrated that fibrin formation, and likely thrombosis, accelerate calcification in bioprosthetic devices, potentially reducing their longevity. His insights highlight the importance of managing coagulation processes to extend the lifespan of bioprosthetic materials and improve clinical outcomes. To better understand role of recellularization in biomaterials but also in valve disorders, Smadja is involved in mechanistic studies as evidenced in a FRM publication.
