= Circulating endothelial cell =

Circulating endothelial cells (CECs) are endothelial cells that have been shed from the lining of the vascular wall into the blood stream. Endothelial cells normally line blood vessels to maintain vascular integrity and permeability, but when these cells enter into the circulation, this could be a reflection of vascular dysfunction and damage. There are many factors involved in the process of creating CECs, including: reduced interaction between the endothelial cells and basement membrane proteins, damaged endothelial cellular adhesion molecules, mechanical injury, decreased survival of cytoskeletal proteins, and inflammation.

Endothelial progenitor cells (EPCs) are cells derived from the bone marrow which differentiate into endothelial cells to help support the vascular endothelium and create new blood vessels. EPCs are biomarkers of repair while CEC are biomarkers of damage. They can be distinguished by their different surface markers .

== History ==
Identification of CECs began in the 1970s. A key step in their investigation occurred in 1992 when monoclonal antibodies to surface CEC antigens were discovered, leading to novel markers of CECs.

== Role in cardiovascular disease ==
Prior to a myocardial infarction (MI or heart attack), plaque may accumulate in the coronary arteries, Some plaque formations may rupture, causing a mechanical dislodgment of endothelial cells creating CEC. The plaque that stays lodged in the coronary arteries may restrict blood flow to the cardiac muscle. This causes ischemia; the progressive death of cardiac muscle due to lack of oxygen. If the heart muscles have prolonged ischemia this may lead to the detachment of endocardial endothelial cells which can also create CEC.

== Frequency ==
Studies have reported that in healthy individuals CECs are often at very low levels in the blood. Conversely, diseased individuals who suffer from cardiovascular problems, such as MIs, have elevated CEC levels found within the blood. Using immunomagnetic separation or flow cytometry, CEC levels can be quantified. Although levels vary between individuals, a study observed a mean of 40.6 cell/ml in individuals who suffered a heart attack . In comparison, 0.4 cells/ ml were found in healthy individuals

== Detection ==
The High-Definition Circulating Endothelial Cell (HD-CEC) assay is a novel fluid biopsy test which detects endothelial cells in the blood of patients who have recently suffered a heart attack. Though not yet approved by the FDA, this test has demonstrated better specificity than the FDA approved CellSearch test used to detect circulating tumour cells. CECs are known to express endothelial markers such as the blood glycoprotein von Willebrand factor (vWF) which is involved in platelet aggregation and adhesion, CECs also express the cell surface protein CD146 which is the most commonly known endothelial marker found in CECs and plays an important role in permeability, cell-cell cohesion and signalling. CECs are identifiable through DAPI staining, a specialised method of DNA staining, and are absent of the hematopoietic marker CD45. The HD-CEC assay identifies these markers based on reaction with specific antibodies as well as morphological characteristics of their cytoplasm and nuclei.

=== Research ===
Further studies will use the HD-CEC test on patients who currently exhibit signs and symptoms of a heart attack but have not yet experienced one. Researchers are hoping that the HD-CEC test will be used to predict cardiovascular diseases such as acute MI, angina and heart failure and analyze vascular damage.
