= PTPRCAP =

Protein-coding gene in the species Homo sapiens

Identifiers
- Aliases: PTPRCAP, CD45-AP, LPAP, protein tyrosine phosphatase, receptor type C associated protein, protein tyrosine phosphatase receptor type C associated protein
- External IDs: OMIM: 601577; MGI: 97811; HomoloGene: 48358; GeneCards: PTPRCAP; OMA:PTPRCAP - orthologs

Gene location (Human)
Chr.	Chromosome 11 (human)
Band	11q13.2	Start	67,435,510 bp
Band	11q13.2	End	67,437,682 bp

Gene location (Mouse)
Chr.	Chromosome 19 (mouse)
Band	19 A|19 3.86 cM	Start	4,203,603 bp
Band	19 A|19 3.86 cM	End	4,206,750 bp
RNA expression pattern
Bgee	Human / Mouse (ortholog); Top expressed in: granulocyte; spleen; blood; lymph node; appendix; mucosa of transverse colon; bone marrow cells; gonad; right uterine tube; duodenum / Top expressed in: thymus; spleen; bone marrow; granulocyte; jejunum; ileum; colon; pharynx; lung; morula; More reference expression data
BioGPS	n/a
Orthologs
Species	Human	Mouse
Entrez	5790	19265
Ensembl	ENSG00000213402	ENSMUSG00000045826
UniProt	Q14761	Q64697
RefSeq (mRNA)	NM_005608	NM_016933
RefSeq (protein)	NP_005599	NP_058629
Location (UCSC)	Chr 11: 67.44 – 67.44 Mb	Chr 19: 4.2 – 4.21 Mb
PubMed search
- Wikidata
View/Edit Human	View/Edit Mouse

Protein tyrosine phosphatase receptor type C-associated protein is an enzyme that in humans is encoded by the PTPRCAP gene.

The protein encoded by this gene was identified as a transmembrane phosphoprotein specifically associated with tyrosine phosphatase PTPRC/CD45, a key regulator of T- and B-lymphocyte activation. The interaction with PTPRC may be required for the stable expression of this protein.
