= VSEL =

VSEL may stand for:

- Vickers Shipbuilding and Engineering Ltd, a former English shipbuilding company
- Very small embryonic-like stem cells, a population of adult stem cells
