= GANAB =

Protein-coding gene in the species Homo sapiens

Identifiers
- Aliases: GANAB, G2AN, GLUII, GIIA, glucosidase II alpha subunit, PKD3
- External IDs: OMIM: 104160; MGI: 1097667; GeneCards: GANAB
Enzyme activity
EC #	BRENDA	ExPASy	KEGG	MetaCyc
3.2.1.207	↗	↗	↗	↗

Gene location (Human)
Chr.	Chromosome 11 (human)
Band	11q12.3	Start	62,624,826 bp
Band	11q12.3	End	62,646,726 bp

Gene location (Mouse)
Chr.	Chromosome 19 (mouse)
Band	19|19 A	Start	8,875,435 bp
Band	19|19 A	End	8,894,036 bp
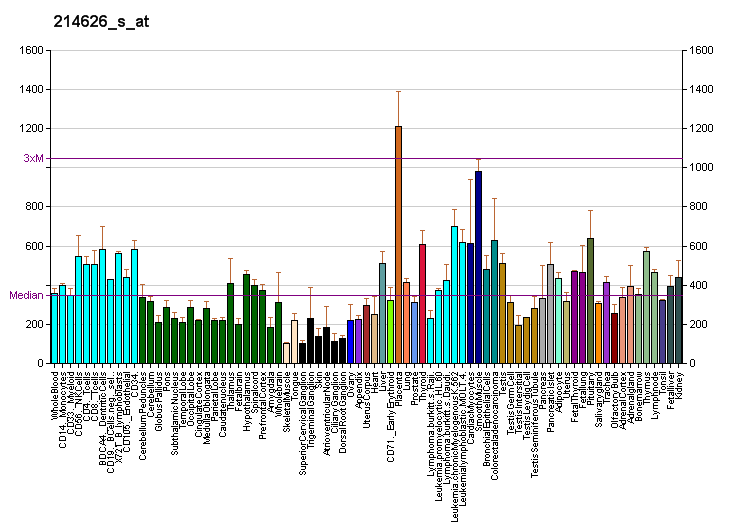

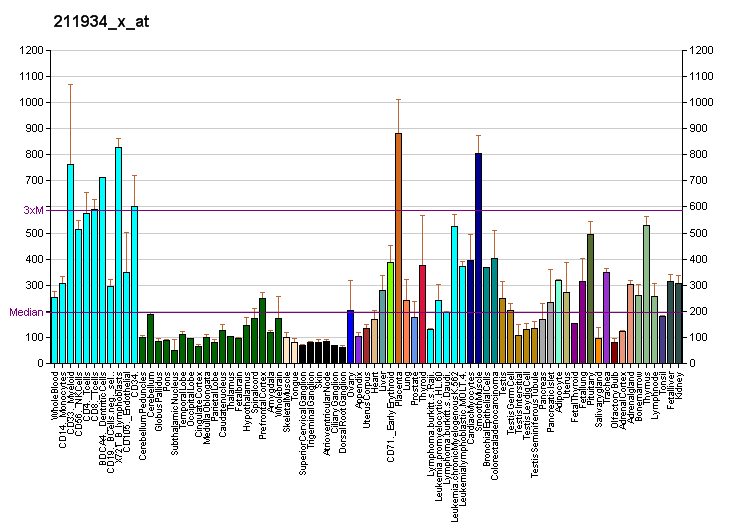
RNA expression pattern
Bgee	Human / Mouse (ortholog); Top expressed in: stromal cell of endometrium; islet of Langerhans; ventricular zone; right ovary; left ovary; right lobe of thyroid gland; body of pancreas; canal of the cervix; smooth muscle tissue; body of uterus / Top expressed in: cumulus cell; ventricular zone; yolk sac; neural layer of retina; gastrula; epiblast; lip; tail of embryo; dentate gyrus of hippocampal formation granule cell; right kidney; More reference expression data
BioGPS	More reference expression data
Gene ontology
Molecular function	hydrolase activity, hydrolyzing O-glycosyl compounds; catalytic activity; hydrolase activity; carbohydrate binding; hydrolase activity, acting on glycosyl bonds; glucan 1,3-alpha-glucosidase activity; RNA binding; protein binding; alpha-glucosidase activity
Cellular component	melanosome; Golgi apparatus; endoplasmic reticulum lumen; glucosidase II complex; membrane; extracellular exosome; endoplasmic reticulum; extracellular matrix; intracellular membrane-bounded organelle
Biological process	metabolism; protein folding; carbohydrate metabolic process; N-glycan processing
Sources:Amigo / QuickGO
Orthologs
Databases	NCBI: entry; OMA: entry
Species	Human	Mouse
Entrez	23193	14376
Ensembl	ENSG00000089597	ENSMUSG00000071650
UniProt	Q14697	Q8BHN3
RefSeq (mRNA)	NM_198335; NM_001278192; NM_001278193; NM_001278194; NM_014610 NM_198334; NM_001329222; NM_001329223; NM_001329224; NM_001329225	NM_001293621; NM_008060
RefSeq (protein)	NP_001265121; NP_001265122; NP_001265123; NP_001316151; NP_001316152 NP_001316153; NP_001316154; NP_938148; NP_938149	NP_001280550; NP_032086
Location (UCSC)	Chr 11: 62.62 – 62.65 Mb	Chr 19: 8.88 – 8.89 Mb
PubMed search
- Wikidata
View/Edit Human	View/Edit Mouse

Neutral alpha-glucosidase AB is an enzyme that in humans is encoded by the GANAB gene.

== Interactions ==
GANAB has been shown to interact with PTPRC.
