= Gene knock-in =

Genetic engineering technique

In molecular cloning and biology, a gene knock-in (abbreviation: KI) refers to a genetic engineering method that involves the one-for-one substitution of DNA sequence information in a genetic locus or the insertion of sequence information not found within the locus. Typically, this is done in mice since the technology for this process is more refined and there is a high degree of shared sequence complexity between mice and humans. The difference between knock-in technology and traditional transgenic techniques is that a knock-in involves a gene inserted into a specific locus, and is thus a "targeted" insertion. It is the opposite of gene knockout.

A common use of knock-in technology is for the creation of disease models. It is a technique by which scientific investigators may study the function of the regulatory machinery (e.g. promoters) that governs the expression of the natural gene being replaced. This is accomplished by observing the new phenotype of the organism in question. The BACs and YACs are used in this case so that large fragments can be transferred.

== Technique ==
Gene knock-in originated as a slight modification of the original knockout technique developed by Martin Evans, Oliver Smithies, and Mario Capecchi. Traditionally, knock-in techniques have relied on homologous recombination to drive targeted gene replacement, although other methods using a transposon-mediated system to insert the target gene have been developed. The use of loxP flanking sites that become excised upon expression of Cre recombinase with gene vectors is an example of this. Embryonic stem cells with the modification of interest are then implanted into a viable blastocyst, which will grow into a mature chimeric mouse with some cells having the original blastocyst cell genetic information and other cells having the modifications introduced to the embryonic stem cells. Subsequent offspring of the chimeric mouse will then have the gene knock-in.

Gene knock-in has allowed, for the first time, hypothesis-driven studies on gene modifications and resultant phenotypes. Mutations in the human p53 gene, for example, can be induced by exposure to benzo(a)pyrene (BaP) and the mutated copy of the p53 gene can be inserted into mouse genomes. Lung tumors observed in the knock-in mice offer support for the hypothesis of BaP’s carcinogenicity. More recent developments in knock-in technique have allowed for pigs to have a gene for green fluorescent protein inserted with a CRISPR/Cas9 system, which allows for much more accurate and successful gene insertions. The speed of CRISPR/Cas9-mediated gene knock-in also allows for biallelic modifications to some genes to be generated and the phenotype in mice observed in a single generation, an unprecedented timeframe.

== Versus gene knockout ==
Knock-in technology is different from knockout technology in that knockout technology aims to either delete part of the DNA sequence or insert irrelevant DNA sequence information to disrupt the expression of a specific genetic locus. Gene knock-in technology, on the other hand, alters the genetic locus of interest via a one-for-one substitution of DNA sequence information or by the addition of sequence information that is not found on said genetic locus. A gene knock-in therefore can be seen as a gain-of-function mutation and a gene knockout a loss-of-function mutation, but a gene knock-in may also involve the substitution of a functional gene locus for a mutant phenotype that results in some loss of function.

== Potential applications ==
Because of the success of gene knock-in methods thus far, many clinical applications can be envisioned. Knock-in of sections of the human immunoglobulin gene into mice has already been shown to allow them to produce humanized antibodies that are therapeutically useful. It should be possible to modify stem cells in humans to restore targeted gene function in certain tissues, for example possibly correcting the mutant gamma-chain gene of the IL-2 receptor in hematopoietic stem cells to restore lymphocyte development in people with X-linked severe combined immunodeficiency.

== Limitations ==
While gene knock-in technology has proven to be a powerful technique for the generation of models of human disease and insight into proteins in vivo, numerous limitations still exist. Many of these are shared with the limitations of knockout technology. First, combinations of knock-in genes lead to growing complexity in the interactions that inserted genes and their products have with other sections of the genome and can therefore lead to more side effects and difficult-to-explain phenotypes. Another limitation is the off target activity. This phenomenon is caused by off target binding of the gRNA if other sequences resemble the target region closely, which makes it possible of the gRNA to unintendedly bind and therefore guide the Cas9-protein off the intended target. This can lead to random integration of the donor template. Also, only a few loci, such as the ROSA26 locus have been characterized well enough where they can be used for conditional gene knock-ins; making combinations of reporter and transgenes in the same locus problematic. The biggest disadvantage of using gene knock-in for human disease model generation is that mouse physiology is not identical to that of humans and human orthologs of proteins expressed in mice will often not wholly reflect the role of a gene in human pathology. This can be seen in mice produced with the ΔF508 fibrosis mutation in the CFTR gene, which accounts for more than 70% of the mutations in this gene for the human population and leads to cystic fibrosis. While ΔF508 CF mice do exhibit the processing defects characteristic of the human mutation, they do not display the pulmonary pathophysiological changes seen in humans and carry virtually no lung phenotype. Such problems could be ameliorated by the use of a variety of animal models, and pig models (pig lungs share many biochemical and physiological similarities with human lungs) have been generated in an attempt to better explain the activity of the ΔF508 mutation.

== See also ==
- Gene knockout
- Genetic engineering
- Genetic recombination
- Molecular cloning
- Plasmid
- Vector (molecular biology)
