= STRA8 =

Protein-coding gene in the species Mus musculus

Identifiers
- Aliases: STRA8, stimulated by retinoic acid 8
- External IDs: OMIM: 609987; MGI: 107917; HomoloGene: 49197; GeneCards: STRA8; OMA:STRA8 - orthologs

Gene location (Human)
Chr.	Chromosome 7 (human)
Band	7q33	Start	135,231,979 bp
Band	7q33	End	135,258,663 bp

Gene location (Mouse)
Chr.	Chromosome 6 (mouse)
Band	6|6 B1	Start	34,897,098 bp
Band	6|6 B1	End	34,916,279 bp
RNA expression pattern
Bgee	Human / Mouse (ortholog); Top expressed in: gonad; sural nerve; human kidney; placenta; right testis; renal cortex; left testis; skin of abdomen; left uterine tube; putamen / Top expressed in: spermatogonium; seminiferous tubule; blastocyst; spermatid; trophoblast giant cell; embryo; morula; spermatocyte; embryo; greater petrosal nerve; More reference expression data
BioGPS	n/a
Gene ontology
Molecular function	protein dimerization activity
Cellular component	cytoplasm; nucleus
Biological process	DNA replication; cellular response to retinoic acid; meiosis; spermatogenesis; regulation of transcription, DNA-templated; male germ-line stem cell asymmetric division; transcription, DNA-templated; positive regulation of transcription by RNA polymerase II; oogenesis; cell differentiation
Sources:Amigo / QuickGO
Orthologs
Species	Human	Mouse
Entrez	346673	20899
Ensembl	ENSG00000146857	ENSMUSG00000029848
UniProt	Q7Z7C7	P70278
RefSeq (mRNA)	NM_182489; NM_001394401	NM_009292
RefSeq (protein)	NP_872295	NP_033318
Location (UCSC)	Chr 7: 135.23 – 135.26 Mb	Chr 6: 34.9 – 34.92 Mb
PubMed search
- Wikidata
View/Edit Human	View/Edit Mouse

Stimulated by retinoic acid 8 is a protein that in humans is encoded by the STRA8 gene.

STRA8 is activated only upon stimulation by retinoic acid and expresses a cytoplasmic protein in the gonads of male and female vertebrates. It plays a key role in gametogenesis by inducing meiosis.

== Structure ==
The Stra8 gene is 26,749 base pairs in length and the Stra8 protein is 36.9 kDa or 330 amino acids. Its protein structure contains a series of alpha helices.

== Function ==
Stra8 functions to initiate the transition between mitosis and meiosis. It does so by forming a complex with the protein MEIOSIN, also initiated by the presence of retinoic acid, to transcribe genes responsible for meiotic activation. Both males and females are left infertile if Stra8 signaling is absent due to spermatogenesis and oogenesis remaining uninitiated.

=== Activation by retinoic acid ===
As implied by its full name, Stra8 is induced by the presence of retinoic acid. The promoter for Stra8 contains a retinoic acid responsive element that induces expression of the Stra8 gene. During fetal development, retinoic acid is supplied from the mesonephros.

=== Role in spermatogenesis ===
Male expression of Stra8 is limited by CYP26B1 activity from fetal to prepubescent development, thus matching the need of spermatogenesis beginning at puberty compared to embryonic oogenesis in females. Following prepubescence, CYP26B1 is no longer expressed, preventing the degradation of retinoic acid and allowing Stra8 to fulfill its function and initiate spermatogenesis. The mechanisms behind the gradual decrease in CYP26B1 expression remains to be elucidated.

Sperm of mice that had induced null mutations for the Stra8 gene were able to undergo mitotic divisions, and while some sperm were able to transition into the early stages of meiosis I, they could not transition into further sub-stages. Errors in chromosome pairing and chromosome condensation were observed following these failures.

=== Role in oogenesis ===
Female expression of Stra8 is uninhibited by CYP26B1 in the primordial germ cells, initiating meiosis. This process may also be referred to as oocytogenesis. The primary oocytes formed will then become arrested in meiosis (prophase I) until menarche.

In female mice, loss of Stra8 signaling shows failure to enter into meiosis.

== Clinical significance ==
=== Induction by cosmetics/medications ===
Products that contain retinoic acid (alternatively retinol or vitamin A) have the potential to cause severe birth defects when used during pregnancy. Induction of Stra8 by retinoic acid can result in premature cell differentiation in the embryo.

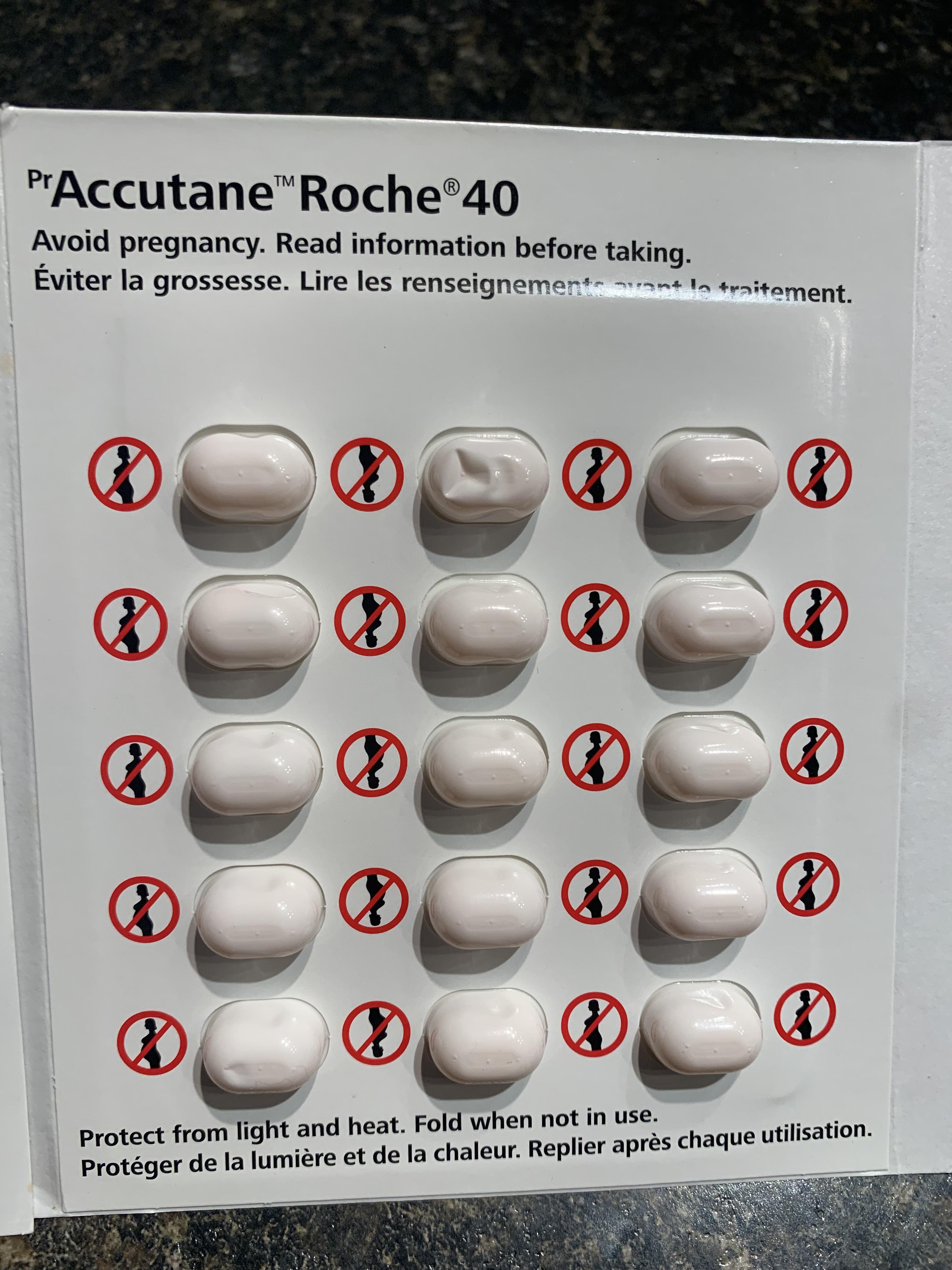
Products that contain retinoic acid should be avoided during pregnancy.
