= Lineage markers =

The lineage markers are characteristic molecules for cell lineages, e.g. cell surface markers, mRNAs, or internal proteins. Certain antibodies can be used to detect or purify cells with these markers by binding to their surface antigens. A standard cocktail of antibodies can be designed to remove or purify mature hematopoietic cells or to detect Cluster of differentiation from a sample. Those antibodies are e.g. targeted to CD2, CD3, CD4, CD5, CD8, NK1.1, B220, TER-119, and Gr-1 in mice and CD3 (T lymphocytes), CD14 (Monocytes), CD16 (NK cells, granulocytes), CD19 (B lymphocytes), CD20 (B lymphocytes), and CD56 (NK cells) in humans.

== Lineage Marker Statistics ==
Lineage markers include mitochondrial DNA (mtDNA) and Y-chromosome short tandem repeat (Y-STR) haplotypes that are transferred directly from generation to generation either from mother to child in the case of mtDNA, or from father to son in the case of the Y-chromosome. X-chromosome markers are another tool that can be used for genetic identity testing. Lineage markers can be helpful in missing persons investigations, disaster victim identification, forensic casework where other evidence is limited, and some complex kinship situations. X-chromosome analysis is especially helpful in assessing some kinship scenarios.
