= Very small embryonic-like stem cells =

Very small embryonic-like stem cells (VSELs) are a term applied to a population of adult stem cells that share several characteristics with embryonic stem cells. Initially described in the early 2000s, VSELs are considered pluripotent or multipotent cells residing in adult tissues, including bone marrow, blood, cord blood, and other organs. They are characterized by their small size, expression of markers typically associated with stemness, and their reported potential to differentiate into various cell types. Despite the history and controversy, VSELs continue to be investigated as a potential target in regenerative medicine research.

== History and controversy ==
VSELs were first proposed by researchers led by Prof. Mariusz Ratajczak at the University of Louisville in 2006. Their discovery was based on identifying a rare population of small, round cells expressing pluripotency-associated markers such as CXCR4, Oct-4, and Sox-2 in cord blood and adult bone marrow. These cells were hypothesized to represent a population of dormant, primitive stem cells that could be activated under certain physiological or pathological conditions. They have been isolated based on CD34 or CD133 positive cells in humans.

Since their initial description, VSELs have been investigated in multiple human tissues, including umbilical cord blood and peripheral blood. Research groups worldwide have studied their potential roles in tissue regeneration, cardiovascular repair, and hematopoiesis. However, the sorting strategy used to isolate such very small cells has been a major source of controversy. Initial criticisms suggested that instead of isolating VSELs, investigators may have inadvertently sorted extracellular vesicles or erythroblasts. These criticisms were addressed in two response papers that argued sorting errors were responsible for misidentifications.

Despite the controversy, over 50 independent scientific groups have reported results confirming the presence of VSELs, without links to the original team. Nearly two decades after the original debate, refined protocols have been developed to reliably enrich VSELs in cord blood, peripheral blood, and bone marrow.

== Characterization ==
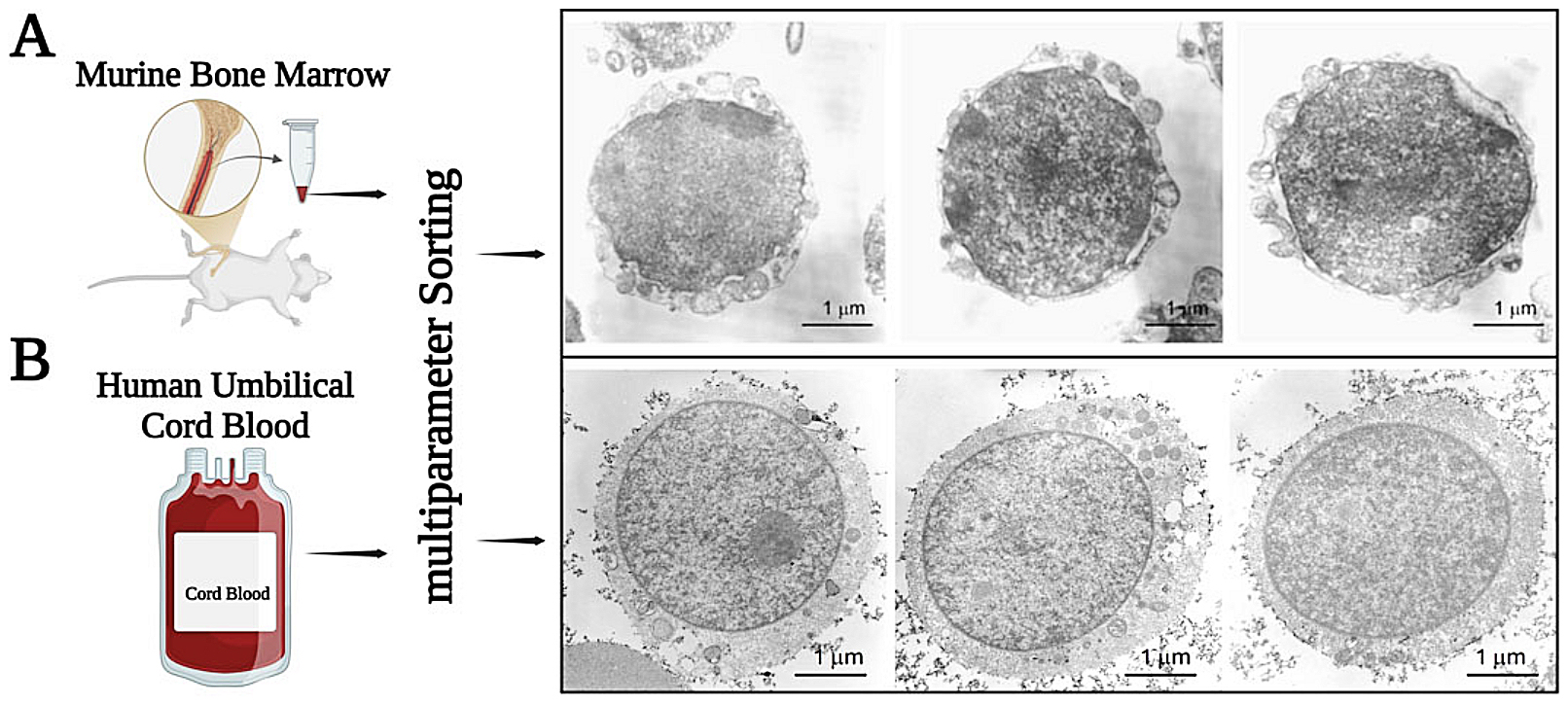
Transmission electron microscopy (TEM) pictures of murine bone marrow- and human umbilical cord blood-purified VSELs. Panel (A) murine VSELs are small, possess a relatively large nucleus surrounded by a narrow rim of cytoplasm. At the ultrastructural level the narrow rim of cytoplasm possesses a few mitochondria, scattered ribosomes, small profiles of endoplasmatic reticulum and a few vesicles. The nucleus is contained within a nuclear envelope with nuclear pores. Chromatin is loosely packed and consists of euchromatin. Panel (B) human VSELs are small and similarly as murine VSELs possess a relatively large nucleus surrounded by a narrow rim of cytoplasm. At the ultrastructural level, this narrow rim of cytoplasm possesses a few round mitochondria, scattered ribosomes, small profiles of endoplasmatic reticulum and a few vesicles. The nucleus is contained within a nuclear envelope with nuclear pores. Chromatin is loosely packed and consists of euchromatin.

VSELs are reported to possess the ability to differentiate both in vitro and in vivo into tissue-specific stem cells representing all three germ layers. They are distinguished from other stem cell populations by their unique phenotype and distinct molecular characteristics that support their potential for pluripotency and regeneration.

- Size and morphology: VSELs are extremely small, round, typically measuring less than 7 micrometers in diameter—smaller than hematopoietic stem cells (HSCs)—which contributes to their technical difficulty in isolation and analysis.
- Nuclear organization: Unlike mature stem cells, VSELs have a high nucleus-to-cytoplasm ratio.
- Marker expression: They express markers commonly associated with pluripotency, including Oct-4, Sox-2, and SSEA-4, and exhibit epigenetic modifications indicative of retained developmental potential.
- Quiescence and activation: VSELs remain dormant in adult tissues but may become activated by injury or stress, potentially contributing to tissue repair.

== Function ==
=== VSELs and hematopoietic stem cells (HSCs) ===
Studies have shown that VSELs reside in bone marrow in a quiescent state and can be mobilized into peripheral blood under stress conditions such as tissue injury, hypoxia, or inflammation. Experimental models suggest that VSELs may contribute to blood cell regeneration by differentiating into hematopoietic cells and assisting recovery following bone marrow injury or transplantation. Janina Ratajczak et al. demonstrated that adult murine bone marrow-derived VSELs can differentiate into hematopoietic lineages when co-cultured with OP9 stromal cells, supporting their potential role in blood cell development. Bulk RNA-Seq analysis and scRNA-seq enabled a comprehensive comparison of the transcriptomic profiles between HSCs and VSELs, providing valuable insights into their molecular differences.

=== VSEL, lung diseases, and epithelial differentiation ===
In humans, VSELs have been quantified in peripheral blood by flow cytometry and proposed as biomarkers of hypoxic lung disease and pulmonary hypertension, suggesting a role in disease monitoring and pathophysiology. Krause's group provided early evidence that non-hematopoietic VSELs, rather than bone marrow-derived cells (BMDCs), differentiate into lung epithelial cells. More recently, studies have shown that VSELs can differentiate into bronchioalveolar stem cells (BASCs) and alveolar type 2 (AT2) cells, indicating potential for cell therapy development in lung injury.

=== VSELs, cardiovascular Diseases, and endothelial differentiation. ===
VSELs have been reported to mobilize into peripheral blood during stress conditions such as myocardial infarction and critical limb ischemia (CLI). Research from David Smadja's group has shown that bone marrow-derived VSELs from CLI patients, when cultured for two weeks in angiogenic media, demonstrated beneficial effects in preclinical mouse models of limb ischemia. These cultured VSELs were also able to differentiate into endothelial and perivascular cells in matrigel implant models.

Dominguez et al. have explored the differentiation of VSELs into endothelial colony-forming cells (ECFCs), a vasculogenic subtype of endothelial progenitor cells. Additional studies have supported the endothelial differentiation capacity of VSELs. The team led by Henon has specifically investigated the role of VSELs in cell therapy after myocardial infarction, reporting that CD34+ cell products (Protheracytes) are enriched in VSELs and show promising regenerative properties. Notably, the CellProthera expansion protocol for CD34+ cells reportedly increases the VSEL proportion to approximately 5% in the final cell product administered to patients.
