= EMCN =

Protein-coding gene in the species Homo sapiens

Identifiers
- Aliases: EMCN, EMCN2, MUC14, endomucin
- External IDs: OMIM: 608350; MGI: 1891716; GeneCards: EMCN

Gene location (Human)
Chr.	Chromosome 4 (human)
Band	4q24	Start	100,395,341 bp
Band	4q24	End	100,880,126 bp

Gene location (Mouse)
Chr.	Chromosome 3 (mouse)
Band	3|3 G3	Start	137,046,828 bp
Band	3|3 G3	End	137,137,946 bp
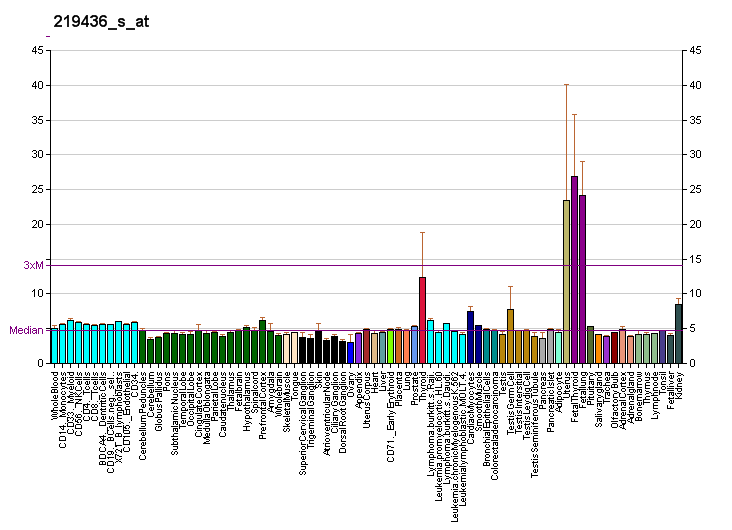
RNA expression pattern
Bgee	Human / Mouse (ortholog); Top expressed in: Achilles tendon; lower lobe of lung; parietal pleura; skin of hip; renal medulla; right lobe of thyroid gland; visceral pleura; human kidney; right lung; gallbladder / Top expressed in: left lung lobe; adrenal gland; genital tubercle; atrioventricular valve; right kidney; atrium; cardiac muscle tissue of left ventricle; interventricular septum; right lung; human kidney; More reference expression data
BioGPS	More reference expression data
Orthologs
Databases	NCBI: entry; OMA: entry
Species	Human	Mouse
Entrez	51705	59308
Ensembl	ENSG00000164035	ENSMUSG00000054690
UniProt	Q9ULC0	Q9R0H2
RefSeq (mRNA)	NM_001159694; NM_016242	NM_001163522; NM_016885
RefSeq (protein)	NP_001153166; NP_057326	NP_001156994; NP_058581
Location (UCSC)	Chr 4: 100.4 – 100.88 Mb	Chr 3: 137.05 – 137.14 Mb
PubMed search
- Wikidata
View/Edit Human	View/Edit Mouse

Endomucin is a protein that in humans is encoded by the EMCN gene. Endomucin is a marker for endothelial cells and hematopoietic stem cells.

== Function ==
EMCN is a mucin-like sialoglycoprotein that interferes with the assembly of focal adhesion complexes and inhibits interaction between cells and the extracellular matrix.
