= MEIOSIN =

Identifiers
- Aliases: MEIOSIN, HMGDC, basic helix-loop-helix and HMG-box containing 1, meiosis initiator, BHMG1
- External IDs: MGI: 3647482; GeneCards: MEIOSIN; OMA:MEIOSIN - orthologs

Gene location (Human)
Chr.	Chromosome 19 (human)
Band	19q13.32	Start	45,733,439 bp
Band	19q13.32	End	45,764,541 bp

Gene location (Mouse)
Chr.	Chromosome 7 (mouse)
Band	7|7 A3	Start	18,832,971 bp
Band	7|7 A3	End	18,852,293 bp
RNA expression pattern
Bgee	Human / Mouse (ortholog); Top expressed in: right testis; left testis; gonad; right auricle of heart; mucosa of esophagus / Top expressed in: embryo; testicle; zygote; epiblast; spermatid; genital tubercle; mesencephalon; neural tube; secondary oocyte; ventricular zone; More reference expression data
BioGPS	n/a
Gene ontology
Molecular function	protein dimerization activity; DNA binding
Cellular component	nucleus
Biological process	regulation of transcription, DNA-templated; transcription, DNA-templated
Sources:Amigo / QuickGO
Orthologs
Species	Human	Mouse
Entrez	388553	243866
Ensembl	ENSG00000237452	ENSMUSG00000085601
UniProt	C9JSJ3	A0A5K7RLP0
RefSeq (mRNA)	NM_001310124	NM_001370811; NM_001370812
RefSeq (protein)	NP_001297053	NP_001357740; NP_001357741
Location (UCSC)	Chr 19: 45.73 – 45.76 Mb	Chr 7: 18.83 – 18.85 Mb
PubMed search
- Wikidata
View/Edit Human	View/Edit Mouse

Meiosis initiator protein is a protein that in humans is encoded by the MEIOSIN gene.
