= ROSA26 =

ROSA26 is a locus used for constitutive, ubiquitous gene expression in mice. It was first isolated in 1991 by the group of Philippe Soriano in a gene-trap mutagenesis screen of embryonic stem cells (ESCs). Over 800 knock-in lines have been created based on the ROSA26 locus according to the MGI database. The human homolog of the ROSA26 locus has been identified. ROSA stands for Reverse Orientation Splice Acceptor, named after the lentivirus genetrap vector.
