= CD146 =

Protein found in humans

MCAM

Identifiers
- Aliases: MCAM, CD146, MUC18, melanoma cell adhesion molecule, HEMETCAM, MelCAM
- External IDs: OMIM: 155735; MGI: 1933966; GeneCards: MCAM

Gene location (Human)
Chr.	Chromosome 11 (human)
Band	11q23.3	Start	119,308,529 bp
Band	11q23.3	End	119,321,521 bp

Gene location (Mouse)
Chr.	Chromosome 9 (mouse)
Band	9|9 A5.1	Start	44,045,766 bp
Band	9|9 A5.1	End	44,054,024 bp
RNA expression pattern
Bgee	Human / Mouse (ortholog); Top expressed in: popliteal artery; tibial arteries; right coronary artery; saphenous vein; left coronary artery; thoracic aorta; ascending aorta; Descending thoracic aorta; gastric mucosa; subcutaneous adipose tissue / Top expressed in: tunica media of zone of aorta; lactiferous gland; left lung lobe; atrium; tunica adventitia of aorta; white adipose tissue; ascending aorta; umbilical cord; facial motor nucleus; right lung lobe; More reference expression data
BioGPS	n/a
Orthologs
Databases	NCBI: entry; OMA: entry
Species	Human	Mouse
Entrez	4162	84004
Ensembl	ENSG00000076706	ENSMUSG00000032135
UniProt	P43121	Q8R2Y2
RefSeq (mRNA)	NM_006500	NM_023061; NM_001359530
RefSeq (protein)	NP_006491	NP_075548; NP_001346459
Location (UCSC)	Chr 11: 119.31 – 119.32 Mb	Chr 9: 44.05 – 44.05 Mb
PubMed search
- Wikidata
View/Edit Human	View/Edit Mouse

CD146 (cluster of differentiation 146) also known as the melanoma cell adhesion molecule (MCAM) or cell surface glycoprotein MUC18, is a 113kDa cell adhesion molecule currently used as a marker for endothelial cell lineage. In humans, the CD146 protein is encoded by the MCAM gene.

== Function ==
MCAM functions as a receptor for laminin alpha 4, a matrix molecule that is broadly expressed within the vascular wall. Accordingly, MCAM is highly expressed by cells that are components of the blood vessel wall, including vascular endothelial cells, smooth muscle cells and pericytes. Its function is still poorly understood, but evidence points to it being part of the endothelial junction associated with the actin cytoskeleton. A member of the Immunoglobulin superfamily, it consists of five Ig domains, a transmembrane domain, and a cytoplasmic region. It is expressed on chicken embryonic spleen and thymus, activated human T cells, endothelial progenitors such as angioblasts and mesenchymal stem cells, and strongly expressed on blood vessel endothelium and smooth muscle.

Two isoforms exist (MCAM long (MCAM-1), and MCAM short, or MCAM-s) which differ in the length of their cytoplasmic domain. Activation of these isoforms seems to produce functional differences as well. Natural killer cells transfected with MCAM-1 demonstrate decreased rolling velocity and increased cell adhesion to an endothelial cell monolayer and increased microvilli formation while cells transfected with MCAM-s showed no change in adhesion characteristics. Since these characteristics are important in leukocyte extravasation, MCAM-1 may be an important part of the inflammatory response.

CD146 has been demonstrated to appear on a small subset of T and B lymphocytes in the peripheral blood of healthy individuals. The CD146+ T cells display an immunophenotype consistent with effector memory cells and have a distinct gene profile from the CD146- T cells. CD146 T cells have been shown by Dagur and colleagues to produce IL-17.

CD146 has been seen as a marker for mesenchymal stem cells isolated from multiple adult and fetal organs, and its expression may be linked to multipotency; mesenchymal stem cells with greater differentiation potential express higher levels of CD146 on the cell surface.

== Relevance in cancer ==
MCAM inhibits breast cancer progression.

Normal melanocytes do not express MCAM and the expression of MCAM is first found in nevi and melanoma cells. MCAM expression is positively correlated to melanoma progression at which the expression of MCAM is highest in metastatic melanoma cells. The significance of MCAM upregulation is evident in melanoma cells cultured in 3D skin reconstruct in which MCAM facilitates the migration of melanoma into the dermis. Without the expression of MCAM melanoma cells are controlled by keratinocytes in the epidermis that inhibit penetrance beyond the basement membrane. The control by keratinocytes are only achieved by E-cadherin expression on the surface of melanoma cells. Melanoma cells with functional E-cadherin on the surface can only exclusively grow in the epidermis as keratinocytes frequently downregulate the expression of MCAM on melanoma cells.
