= Sca-1 =

Sca-1 stands for "Stem cells antigen-1" (official gene symbol: Ly6a). It consist of 18-kDa mouse glycosyl phosphatidylinositol-anchored cell surface protein (GPI-AP) of the LY6 gene family. It is the common biological marker used to identify hematopoietic stem cell (HSC) along with other markers.

== Application of Sca-1 ==
1. Sca-1 has a regenerative role in cardiac repair: Host cells with specific Sca-1+CD31− markers arise upon myocardial infarction, with evidence of expression of Sca-1 protein.
2. Sca-1 plays a role in hematopoietic progenitor/stem cell lineage fate and c-kit expression.
