= CD31 =

Mammalian protein found in humans

PECAM1
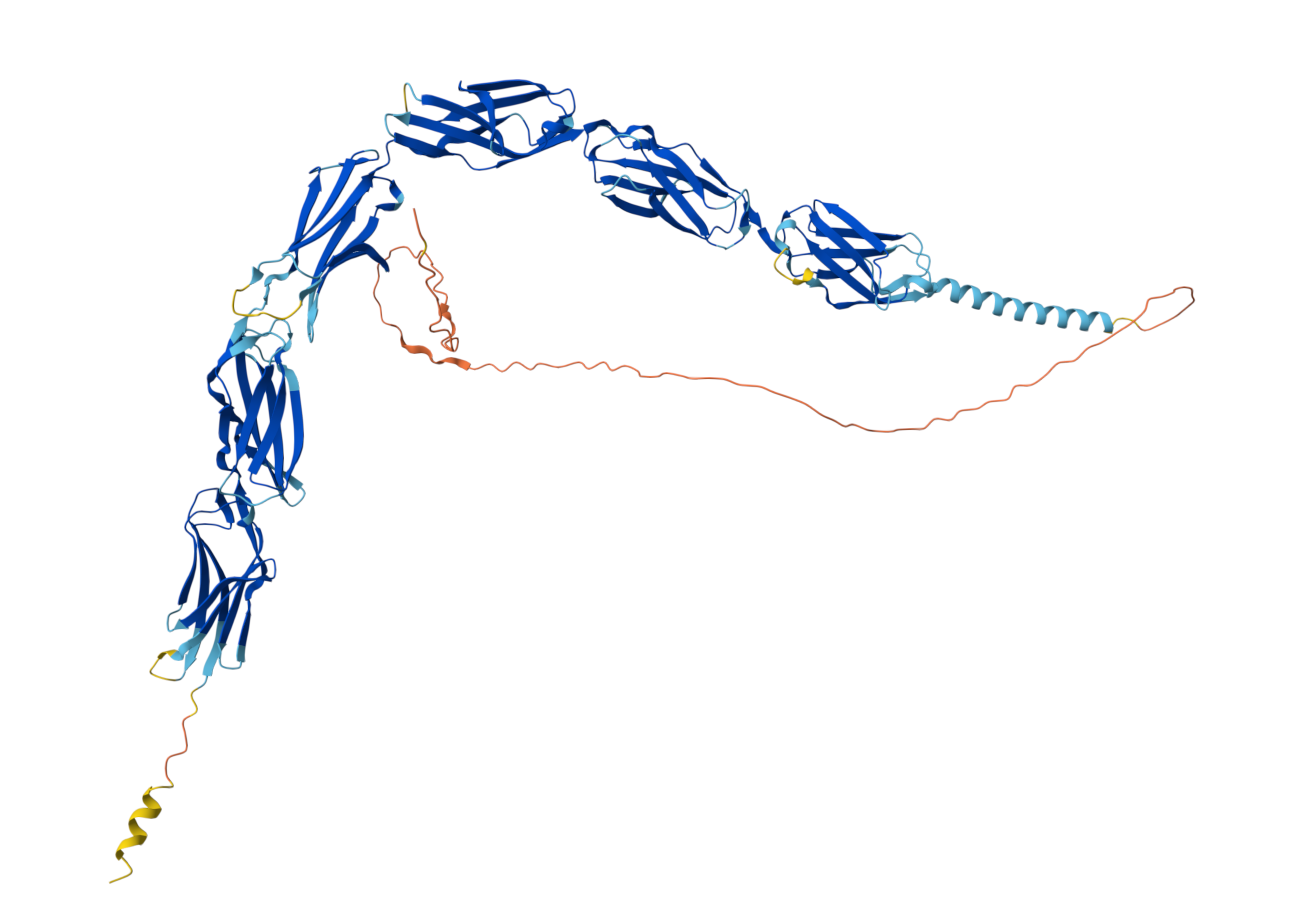

Identifiers
- Aliases: PECAM1, CD31, CD31/EndoCAM, GPIIA', PECA1, PECAM-1, endoCAM, platelet and endothelial cell adhesion molecule 1, PCAM-1
- External IDs: OMIM: 173445; MGI: 97537; GeneCards: PECAM1
Available structures
PDB	Ortholog search: PDBe RCSB
PDB	List of PDB id codes 2KY5, 5C14

Gene location (Human)
Chr.	Chromosome 17 (human)
Band	17q23.3	Start	64,319,415 bp
Band	17q23.3	End	64,413,776 bp

Gene location (Mouse)
Chr.	Chromosome 11 (mouse)
Band	11|11 E1	Start	106,545,043 bp
Band	11|11 E1	End	106,641,454 bp
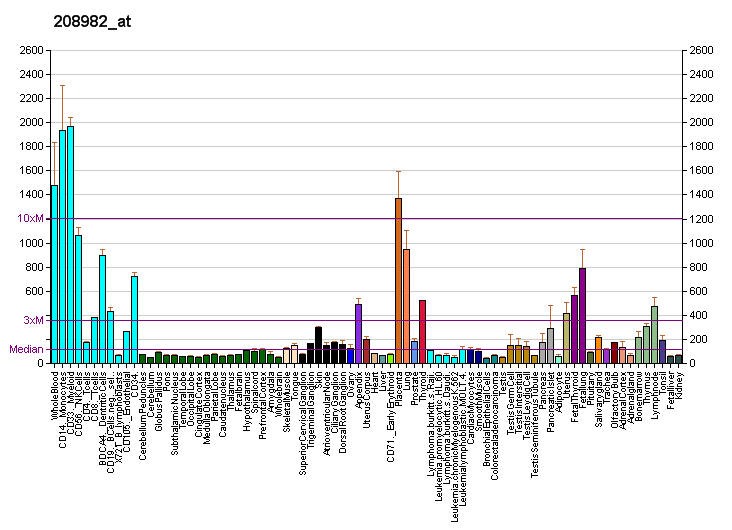

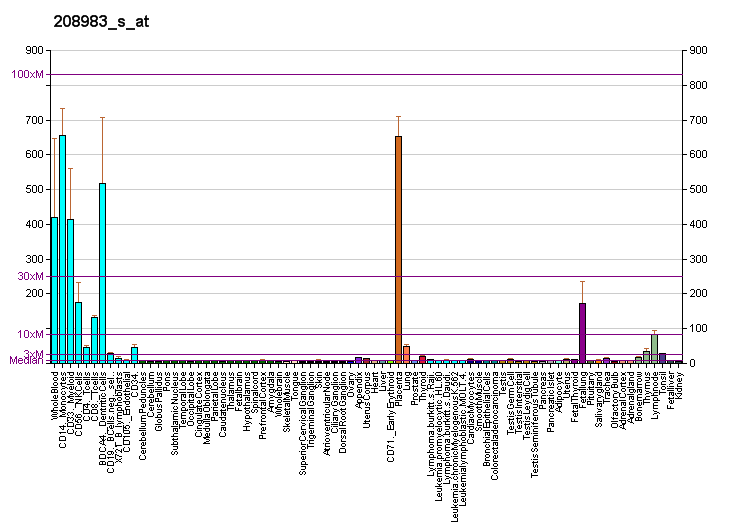

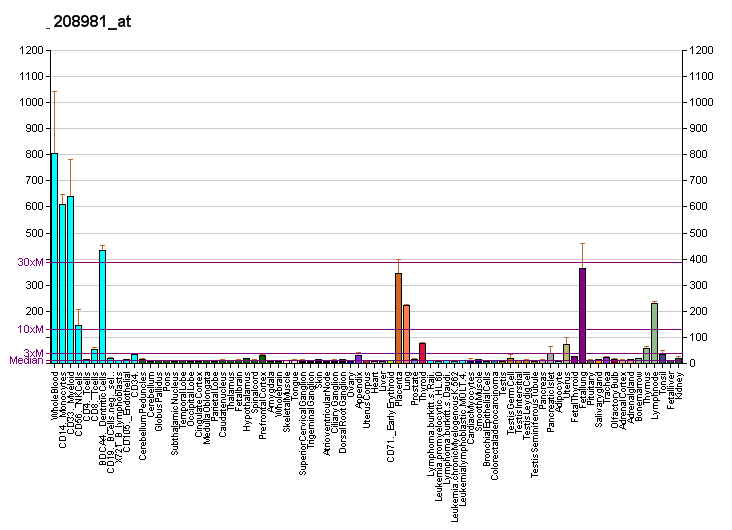
RNA expression pattern
Bgee	Human / Mouse (ortholog); Top expressed in: tendon of biceps brachii; visceral pleura; lower lobe of lung; pericardium; right lung; parietal pleura; monocyte; upper lobe of lung; epithelium of colon; upper lobe of left lung / Top expressed in: right lung lobe; left lung; left lung lobe; vasculature of trunk; mesenteric lymph nodes; muscle of thigh; ascending aorta; aortic valve; glomerular capillary; digastric muscle; More reference expression data
BioGPS	More reference expression data
Gene ontology
Molecular function	protein binding; protein homodimerization activity
Cellular component	integral component of membrane; platelet alpha granule membrane; membrane raft; cell junction; plasma membrane; extracellular exosome; membrane; extracellular space; secretory granule membrane; cytoplasm; external side of plasma membrane; smooth muscle contractile fiber; cell-cell contact zone; cell periphery
Biological process	diapedesis; glomerular endothelium development; platelet degranulation; cell adhesion; extracellular matrix organization; cell recognition; leukocyte migration; signal transduction; phagocytosis; neutrophil degranulation; leukocyte cell-cell adhesion; neutrophil extravasation; cell-cell adhesion via plasma-membrane adhesion molecules; angiogenesis; endothelial cell morphogenesis; homophilic cell adhesion via plasma membrane adhesion molecules; Rho protein signal transduction; regulation of cell migration; monocyte extravasation; wound healing; positive regulation of tyrosine phosphorylation of STAT protein; endothelial cell migration; endothelial cell-matrix adhesion
Sources:Amigo / QuickGO
Orthologs
Databases	NCBI: entry; OMA: entry
Species	Human	Mouse
Entrez	5175	18613
Ensembl	ENSG00000261371	ENSMUSG00000020717
UniProt	P16284	Q08481
RefSeq (mRNA)	NM_000442	NM_001032378; NM_008816; NM_001305157; NM_001305158
RefSeq (protein)	NP_000433	NP_001027550; NP_001292086; NP_001292087; NP_032842
Location (UCSC)	Chr 17: 64.32 – 64.41 Mb	Chr 11: 106.55 – 106.64 Mb
PubMed search
- Wikidata
View/Edit Human	View/Edit Mouse

Platelet endothelial cell adhesion molecule (PECAM-1) also known as cluster of differentiation 31 (CD31) is a protein that in humans is encoded by the PECAM1 gene found on chromosome17q23.3. PECAM-1 plays a key role in removing aged neutrophils from the body.

== Structure ==
PECAM-1 is a highly glycosylated protein with a mass of approximately 130 kDa. The structure of this protein was determined by molecular cloning in 1990, when it was found out that PECAM-1 has an N-terminal domain with 574 amino acids, a transmembrane domain with 19 amino acids and a C-terminal cytoplasmic domain with 118 amino acids. The N-terminal domain consists of six extracellular Ig-like domains.

=== Interactions ===
PECAM-1 is a cell-cell adhesion protein which interacts with other PECAM-1 molecules through homophilic interactions or with non-PECAM-1 molecules through heterophilic interactions. Homophilic interactions between PECAM-1 molecules are mediated by antiparallel interactions between extracellular Ig-like domain 1 and Ig-like domain 2. These interactions are regulated by the level of PECAM-1 expression. Homophilic interactions occur, only when the surface expression of PECAM-1 is high. Otherwise, when expression is low, heterophilic interactions occur.

== Tissue distribution ==
CD31 is normally found on endothelial cells, platelets, macrophages and Kupffer cells, granulocytes, lymphocytes (T cells, B cells, and NK cells), megakaryocytes, osteoclasts, and brown adipocytes.

=== Immunohistochemistry ===
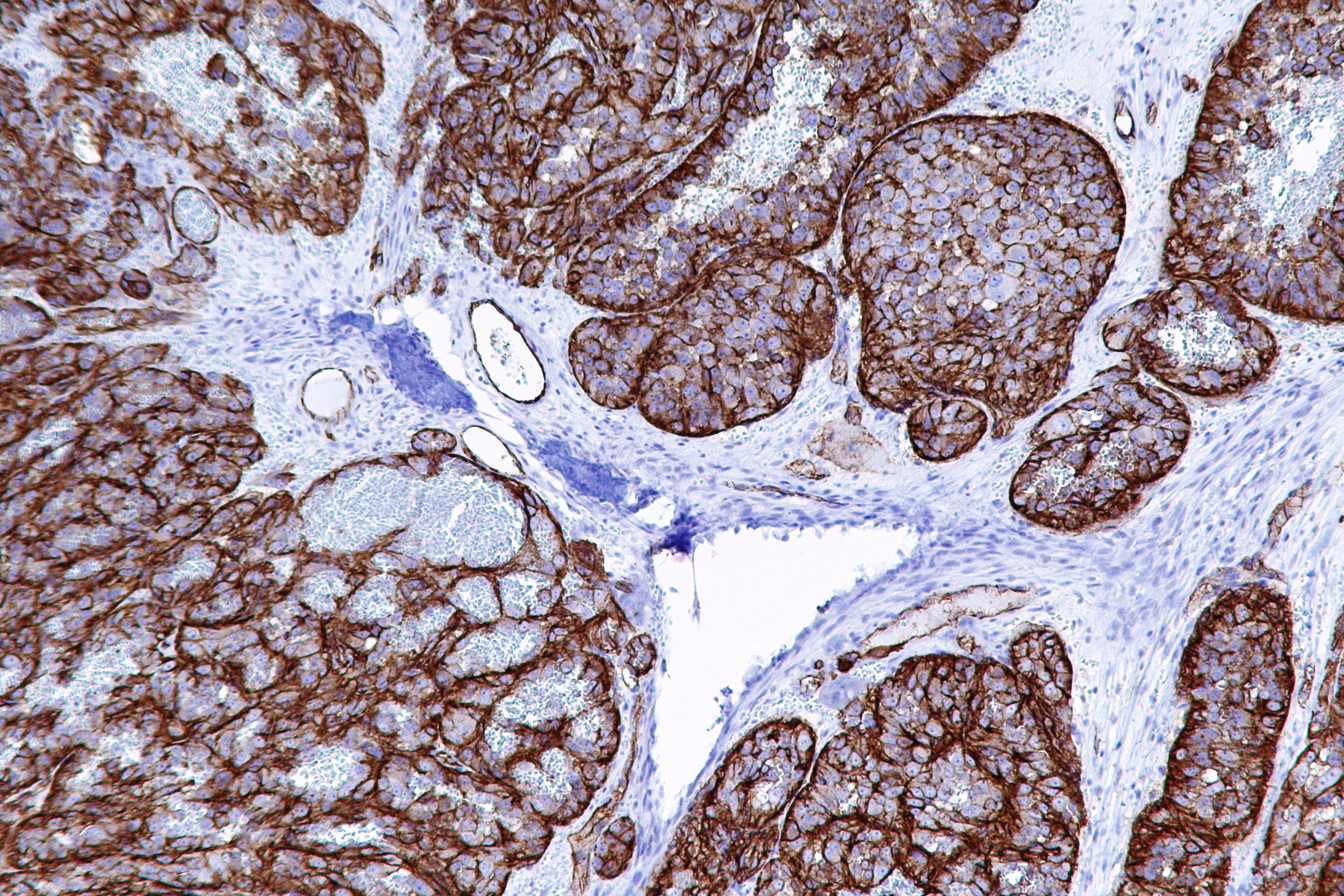
Micrograph of an angiosarcoma stained with a CD31 immunostain (dark brown).

In immunohistochemistry, CD31 is used primarily to demonstrate the presence of endothelial cells in histological tissue sections. This can help to evaluate the degree of tumor angiogenesis, which can imply a rapidly growing tumor. Malignant endothelial cells also commonly retain the antigen, so that CD31 immunohistochemistry can also be used to demonstrate both angiomas and angiosarcomas. It can also be demonstrated in small lymphocytic and lymphoblastic lymphomas, although more specific markers are available for these conditions.

== Function ==
PECAM-1 is found on the surface of platelets, monocytes, neutrophils, and some types of T-cells, and makes up a large portion of endothelial cell intercellular junctions. The encoded protein is a member of the immunoglobulin superfamily and is likely involved in leukocyte transmigration, angiogenesis, and integrin activation. CD31 on endothelial cells binds to the CD38 receptor on natural killer cells for those cells to attach to the endothelium.

=== Role in signaling ===
PECAM-1 plays a role in cell signaling. In the cytoplasmic domain of PECAM-1 are serine and tyrosine residues which are suitable for phosphorylation. After the tyrosine is phosphorylated, PECAM-1 recruits Src homology 2 (SH2) domain–containing signaling proteins. These proteins can then initiate signaling pathways. Of all these proteins, the protein most widely reported as interacting with the PECAM-1 cytoplasmic domain is SH2 domain–containing protein-tyrosine phosphatase SHP-2. Signaling through PECAM-1 leads to the activation of neutrophils, monocytes and leukocytes.

=== Leukocyte transmigration ===
PECAM-1 is involved in migration of monocytes and neutrophils, natural killer cells, Vδ1+ γδ T lymphocytes and CD34+ hematopoietic progenitor cells through the endothelial cells. Moreover, PECAM-1 is involved in transendothelial migration of recent thymic emigrants to the secondary lymphoid organs. Mechanism of leukocyte transmigration can be explained by creating a homophilic interaction. In this interaction migrating leukocytes express PECAM-1 on the surface and then they react with PECAM-1 on the surface of endothelial cell.

=== Angiogenesis ===
PECAM-1 is also important for angiogenesis because it enables the formation of new blood vessels through the cell-cell adhesion.

== Role of CD31 in diseases ==
=== Cancer ===
PECAM-1 is expressed by many solid tumor cell lines such as hemangioma, angiosarcoma, Kaposi’s sarcoma, breast carcinoma, glioblastoma, colon carcinoma, skin carcinoma and other tumor cell lines. On the surface of these tumor cells PECAM-1 mediates the adhesion to endothelial cells. PECAM-1 modulates tumor growth by the formation of new endothelial cell tubes. In mice, this process can be inhibited using an anti-PECAM-1 antibody.

Recently, it was found out that elderly patients with gastric cancer have high concentration of PECAM-1 in the serum. That suggests that the use of a serum PECAM-1 level can be a good prognostic marker.

=== Atherosclerosis ===
Inhibition of PECAM-1 leads to a reduction of atherosclerotic lesions in mice. That means that PECAM-1 is involved in atherosclerosis. The exact mechanism, how PECAM-1 contributes to atherosclerosis is not known, but there are some theories. PECAM-1 can act as a mechanoresponsive molecule. Or the pathogenesis can be caused by the infiltration of leukocytes mediated by PECAM-1. Finally, polymorphisms in the PECAM-1 gene can lead to the progression of atherosclerosis.

=== Disseminated intravascular coagulation ===
Extensive microvascular thrombosis and increased microvascular permeability are main characteristics of disseminated intravascular coagulation, a fatal complication of sepsis. Patients with this devastating condition have high levels of PECAM-1 in the serum indicating PECAM-1 as a good diagnostic marker. Moreover, PECAM-1 can protect from the development of disseminated intravascular coagulation by inhibiting macrophage pyroptosis.

=== Neuroinflammation ===
PECAM-1 contributes to at least two of the nervous system diseases, multiple sclerosis and cerebral ischaemia. First signs of multiple sclerosis are defects in the blood brain barrier and leukocyte migration mediated by adhesion molecules such as PECAM-1. Moreover, monocytes in patients with multiple sclerosis express high level of PECAM-1. Cerebral ischaemia is caused by the accumulation of leukocytes, which then infiltrate brain parenchyma and release toxic compounds such as oxygen radicals. Interactions between leukocyte and endothelium are mediated by PECAM-1. High levels of soluble PECAM-1 can be used to diagnose both diseases. Increased PECAM-1 levels indicate damage in the blood brain barrier in patients with multiple sclerosis and high PECAM-1 levels can be used as a short-term prediction of a stroke in patients with cerebral ischaemia.
