= Thy-1 membrane glycoprotein =

Protein found in humans

THY1

Identifiers
- Aliases: THY1, CD90, CDw90, Thy-1 cell surface antigen
- External IDs: OMIM: 188230; MGI: 98747; GeneCards: THY1

Gene location (Human)
Chr.	Chromosome 11 (human)
Band	11q23.3	Start	119,415,476 bp
Band	11q23.3	End	119,424,985 bp

Gene location (Mouse)
Chr.	Chromosome 9 (mouse)
Band	9 A5.1|9 24.52 cM	Start	43,954,681 bp
Band	9 A5.1|9 24.52 cM	End	43,959,876 bp
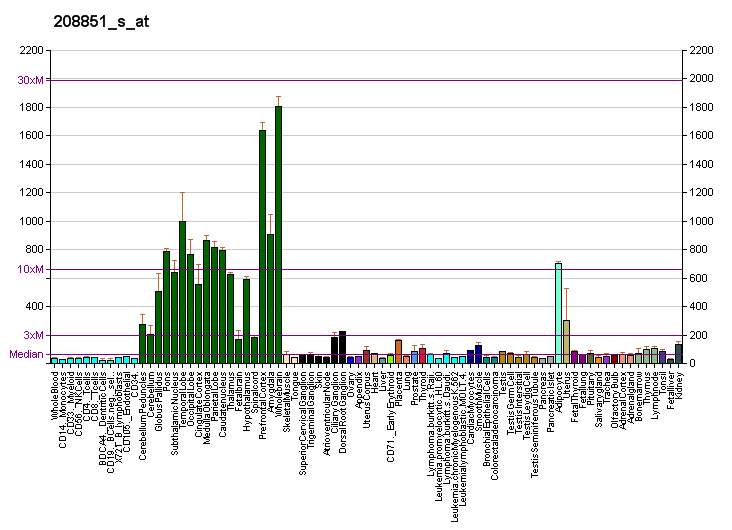

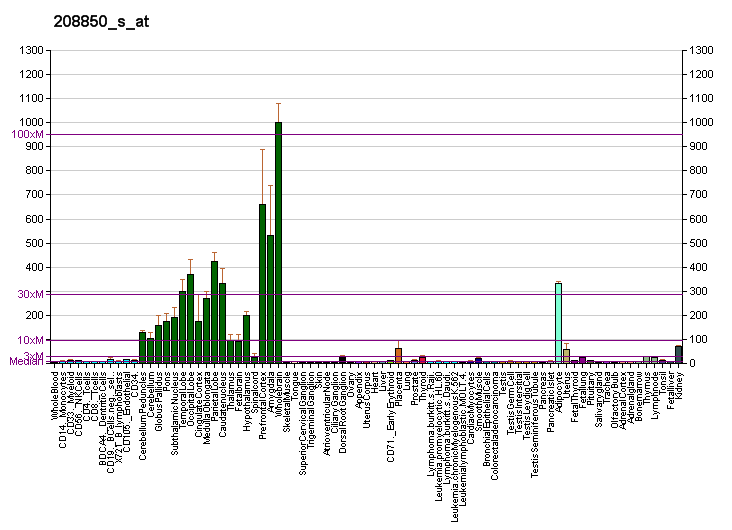

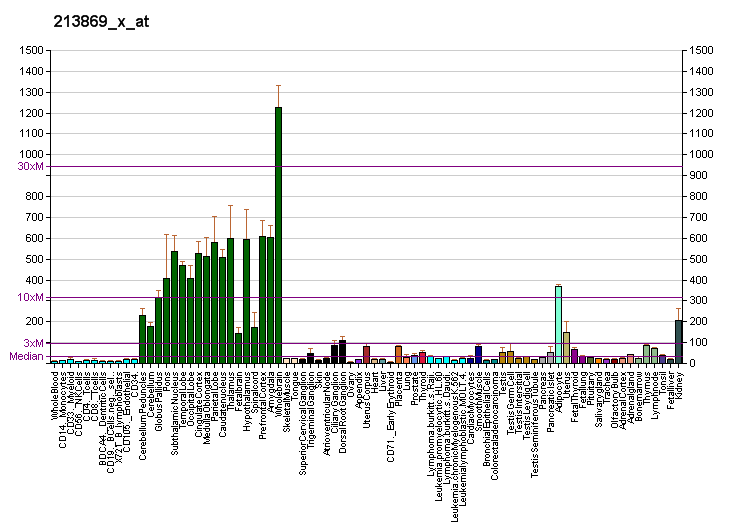
RNA expression pattern
Bgee	Human / Mouse (ortholog); Top expressed in: prefrontal cortex; stromal cell of endometrium; right frontal lobe; gallbladder; lateral nuclear group of thalamus; Brodmann area 9; orbitofrontal cortex; spinal ganglia; nucleus accumbens; superior frontal gyrus / Top expressed in: thymus; primary visual cortex; facial motor nucleus; superior frontal gyrus; dentate gyrus of hippocampal formation granule cell; medial dorsal nucleus; medial geniculate nucleus; entorhinal cortex; perirhinal cortex; motor neuron; More reference expression data
BioGPS	More reference expression data
Gene ontology
Molecular function	protein binding; enzyme binding; GPI anchor binding; GTPase activator activity; protein kinase binding; integrin binding
Cellular component	cytosol; membrane; focal adhesion; growth cone; anchored component of plasma membrane; integral component of plasma membrane; apical plasma membrane; endoplasmic reticulum; anchored component of membrane; extracellular exosome; external side of plasma membrane; membrane raft; anchored component of external side of plasma membrane; dendrite; myelin sheath; extracellular region; plasma membrane; cell surface; axolemma; dendrite membrane; neuronal cell body membrane
Biological process	negative regulation of T cell receptor signaling pathway; positive regulation of GTPase activity; protein autophosphorylation; negative regulation of protein kinase activity; cell adhesion; negative regulation of cell migration; angiogenesis; negative regulation of axonogenesis; cytoskeleton organization; regulation of cell migration; positive regulation of T cell activation; T cell receptor signaling pathway; retinal cone cell development; positive regulation of release of sequestered calcium ion into cytosol; C-terminal protein lipidation; regulation of cell-matrix adhesion; positive regulation of cellular extravasation; integrin-mediated signaling pathway; cell-cell signaling; positive regulation of heterotypic cell-cell adhesion; receptor clustering; positive regulation of focal adhesion assembly; negative regulation of protein tyrosine kinase activity; negative regulation of neuron projection regeneration; regulation of Rho-dependent protein serine/threonine kinase activity; focal adhesion assembly; cell-cell adhesion
Sources:Amigo / QuickGO
Orthologs
Databases	NCBI: entry; OMA: entry
Species	Human	Mouse
Entrez	7070	21838
Ensembl	ENSG00000154096	ENSMUSG00000032011
UniProt	P04216	P01831
RefSeq (mRNA)	NM_006288; NM_001311160; NM_001311162; NM_001372050	NM_009382
RefSeq (protein)	NP_001298089; NP_001298091; NP_006279; NP_001358979	NP_033408
Location (UCSC)	Chr 11: 119.42 – 119.42 Mb	Chr 9: 43.95 – 43.96 Mb
PubMed search
- Wikidata
View/Edit Human	View/Edit Mouse

Thy-1 membrane glycoprotein or CD90 (Cluster of Differentiation 90) is a protein that in humans is encoded by the THY1 gene. It is a 25–37 kDa heavily N-glycosylated, glycophosphatidylinositol (GPI) anchored conserved cell surface protein with a single V-like immunoglobulin domain, originally discovered as a thymocyte antigen. Thy-1 can be used as a marker for a variety of stem cells and for the axonal processes of mature neurons. Structural study of Thy-1 led to the foundation of the Immunoglobulin superfamily, of which it is the smallest member, and led to some of the initial biochemical description and characterization of a vertebrate GPI anchor and also the first demonstration of tissue specific differential glycosylation.

== Discovery and nomenclature ==
The antigen Thy-1 was the first T cell marker to be identified. Thy-1 was discovered by Reif and Allen in 1964 during a search for heterologous antisera against mouse leukemia cells, and was demonstrated by them to be present on murine thymocytes, on T lymphocytes, and on neuronal cells. It was originally named theta (θ) antigen, then Thy-1 (THYmocyte differentiation antigen 1) due to its prior identification in thymocytes (precursors of T cells in the thymus). The human homolog was isolated in 1980 as a 25kDa protein (p25) of T-lymphoblastoid cell line MOLT-3 binding with anti-monkey-thymocyte antisera. The discovery of Thy-1 in mice and humans led to the subsequent discovery of many other T cell markers, which is very significant to the field of immunology since T cells (along with B cells) are the major cellular components of the adaptive immune response.

== The conserved gene and its alleles ==
Thy-1 has been conserved throughout vertebrate evolution and even in some invertebrates, with homologs described in many species like squid, frogs, chickens, mice, rats, dogs, and humans.

The Thy-1 gene is located at human chromosome 11q22.3 (mouse chromosome 9qA5.1). In AceView, it covers 6.82 kb, from 119294854 to 119288036 (NCBI 37, August 2010), on the reverse strand. This locus is very close to CD3 & CD56/NCAM genes. Some believe that there may be a functional significance of both this gene and CD3 delta subunit (T3D) mapping to chromosome 11q in man and chromosome 9 in mouse, though there is no homology (in fact this speculation led to its localization in chromosome 11q - the human chromosome region syntenic to mouse chromosome 9 which harbored T3D). In mice, there are two alleles: Thy-1.1 (Thy-1a, CD90.1) and Thy-1.2 (Thy-1b, CD90.2). They differ by only one amino acid at position 108; an arginine in Thy-1.1 and a glutamine in Thy-1.2. Thy-1.2 is expressed by most strains of mice, whereas Thy-1.1 is expressed by others such as AKR/J and PL mouse strains.

== The Protein ==
The 25-kDa core protein (excluding the heavy glycosylation) of rodent Thy-1 is 111 or 112 amino acids in length, and is N-glycosylated at three sites (In contrast to only two glycosylation sites for human Thy-1). The 162aa (murine, 161 for human) Thy1 precursor has 19 amino acid (aa 1–19) signal sequence and 31 amino acid (aa 132–162) C-terminal transmembrane domain that is present in pro form but removed when transferring the 112 amino acid (aa 20–131) mature peptide to GPI anchor which would attach through the aa 131.

Some of the common monoclonal antibodies used to detect this protein are clones OX7, 5E10, K117 and L127. There have been some reports of Thy1 monoclonal antibodies cross reacting with some cytoskeletal elements: anti Thy-1.2 with actin in marsupial, murine, and human cells and anti Thy-1.1 with vimentin, and were suggested to be due to sequence homology by studies done more than 20 years back.

Thy-1, like many other GPI anchored proteins can be shed by special types of Phospholipase C e.g. PI-PLC (phosphatidyl-Inositol Phospholipase C, or PLC β). it can also be involved in cell to cell transfer of GPI anchored proteins like CD55 and CD59.

== Glycosylation ==
Thy-1 is one of the most heavily glycosylated membrane proteins with a carbohydrate content up to 30% of its molecular mass. Thy-1 in most species has 3 N-glycosylation sites (Asn 23, 74 and 98) but no O-glycosylation. The composition of Thy-1 carbohydrate moieties varies considerably between different tissues or even among cells of the same lineage at different stages of differentiation: e.g., galactosamine only in brain Thy-1, sialic acid in thymic Thy-1 in far excess than brain Thy-1, that too increasing in parallel with T cell maturation. In this regard it has yet another historic association: Thy-1 happens to be the first glycoprotein in which cell type specificity of variant glycosylation on an invariant protein was demonstrated. Analysis of Differencial glycosylation of Thy-1 from brain and thymus showed that all the complex N-linked structures differed between the two forms, superimposed upon a site specific common core. In case of Thy-1 this core pattern was constituted by Asn23 carrying mostly oligomannose structures, Asn74 carrying the most extended complex structures, and Asn98 carrying smaller complex structure. The structure of the sugar residues in the GPI anchor and their associated esterified structures (e.g. additional fatty acids and alcohols) also can be cell type and species specific.

== Expression ==
Thy-1 expression varies between species. Amongst the cells reported to generally express Thy-1 are thymocytes (precursor of T cells in the thymus) & CD34(+) prothymocytes; neurons, mesenchymal stem cells, hematopoietic stem cells, NK cells, murine T-cells, endothelium (mainly in high endothelial venules or HEVs where diapedesis takes place), renal glomerular mesangial cells, circulating metastatic melanoma cells, follicular dendritic cells (FDC), a fraction of fibroblasts and myofibroblasts.

=== Detailed expression of Thy-1 ===
- In mice, Thy-1 is also found on thymocytes, peripheral T cells, myoblasts, epidermal cells, and keratinocytes. It is one of the "pan T cell markers"(of mice) like CD2, CD5 and CD28.
- In humans, Thy-1 is also expressed by endothelial cells, smooth muscle cells, a subset of CD34+ bone marrow cells, and umbilical cord blood-, cardiac fibroblasts, and fetal liver-derived hemopoietic cells.
- Thy-1 is present on a fraction of brain cells and a fraction of fibroblasts of most vertebrate species studied.
- Nervous tissue: Thy-1 expression in the nervous system is predominantly neuronal, but some glial cells also express Thy-1 especially at later stages of their differentiation. One study compared Thy-1 expression in four human neuronal cell lines, two neuroglial cell lines, and fresh tumor cells of neuronal origin and found three of the four neuronal cell lines, all of the neuroglial cell lines, and 80% of the tumors to be strongly positive for Thy-1. Brain part specific ELISA reports are available which show highest concentrations of Thy-1 protein in the striatum and hippocampus, followed by the neocortex, cerebellum, spinal cord, and the retina and optic nerve. Thy-1 promoter has often been assumed to be "brain specific". "Neuron specific" mouse Thy-1 promoter has been used to drive "brain specific" forced expression of proteins e.g. mutated Amyloid precursor protein(APP) as transgenic animal models of Alzheimer's disease. Thy-1 expression in the brain is developmentally regulated. Thy-1 levels in the neonatal rat brain, as well as the developing human brain, are low compared to adult brain. During the first few weeks of postnatal development, Thy-1 levels increase exponentially as the brain matures.
- Lymphoid tissue Thy-1 expression is highly variable between species. In humans, Thy-1 expression is restricted to only a small population of cortical thymocytes and not expressed in mature human T cells. It is probably the most abundant glycoprotein of murine thymocytes, with about One million copies per cell covering up to 10–20% of the cell surface. Mouse cortical thymocytes express higher levels of Thy-1 than medullary thymocytes which in turn express more than lymph node cells (~200,000 copies/cell). A similar inverse developmental temporal expression profile is seen in rats T cells, although rat Thy-1 is lost at an earlier stage of T cell maturation. Thy-1 is only expressed on thymocytes in rats (contrast to thymocytes and splenocytes in mice). The third intron of the mouse Thy-1 gene has a 36 base pair region that recruits nuclear transcription factors, such as Ets-1-like NF, expressed in thymocytes and splenocytes. The homologous region of the rat gene lacks the Ets-1-like NF binding site, but instead binds another NF expressed in rat thymocytes but not splenocytes.

=== Induction of Thy-1 expression ===
- Agents shown to induce Thy-1 expression include: Thymopoietin, thymosin, prostaglandins, nerve growth factor, IL-1, TNF, PMA, Ca2+ ionophore, and diacylglycerol (DAG).

== Localization ==
As a GPI-anchored protein, Thy-1 is present in the outer leaflet of lipid rafts in the cell membrane. In case of neurons it is known to be expressed strongly in the mature axon. The axon hillock can act as a barrier for its lateral spread even though it has no transmembrane segment. Thy-1 has been suggested to interact with G inhibitory proteins, the Src family kinase (SFK) member c-fyn, and tubulin within lipid rafts. In rats and mice, Thy-1 protein is present on the soma (cell body) and dendrites of neurons but is not expressed on axons until axonal growth is complete, and is again temporarily suppressed during axonal injury. HIV-1 Matrix co-localizes with Thy-1 in lipid rafts, the site of virus particle budding from cells, and Thy-1 is incorporated into virus particles as a result of this process.

== Function ==
The function of Thy-1 has not yet been fully elucidated. It has speculated roles in cell-cell and cell-matrix interactions, with implication in neurite outgrowth, nerve regeneration, apoptosis, metastasis, inflammation, and fibrosis.

=== Role in cognition ===
The Thy-1 knockout (KO) mice are viable and appear grossly normal. They display normal social interactions and normal learning in a maze, but fail to learn from social cues (e.g. learning from other mice which foods are safe to eat as compared to wild-type mice). This failure can be rescued by the transgenic expression of Thy-1 or pharmacologic treatment with a GABA (A) receptor antagonists. This suggests that Thy-1 KO mice have excessive GABAergic inhibition in the dentate gyrus and regional inhibition of long-term potentiation.

=== Axon growth regulation ===
Crosslinking anti-Thy-1 Ab can promote neurite outgrowth which is dependent on G{alpha}i and L- and N-type calcium channel activation. The ligand for promotion of neurite outgrowth on astrocytes is not yet identified, but the inhibitory ligand has been suggested to be integrins. Thy1 is one of the known ligands of beta 3 integrins. Interaction of thy1 expressed on maturing axons with beta 3 integrins expressed on mature astrocytes is one of the causes of halting of axon growth.

=== T-cell activation ===
Crosslinking Thy-1 molecules in the membrane raft, in the context of strong costimulatory signaling through CD28 in mouse T cells can act to some extent as a substitute activating signal for T-cell receptor signaling. Conversely it can substitute CD28 costimulation for activation through the TCR.

=== Cell death ===
Cross linking antibody induced aggregation of Thy1 cause death of thymocytes and mesangial cells mainly by apoptosis despite Bcl2 upregulation. The death of mesangial cells seems to be apoptosis by TUNEL staining or annexin V staining, but electron microscopy suggest it is necrosis.

==== Antibody target for animal model of glomerulonephritis ====
Single tail vein intravenous injection of antibody (OX7 mouse monoclonal IgG) against Thy1.1 in rats is used as a standard animal model to produce experimental mesangioproliferative glomerulonephritis which is popularly known in the field of nephrology as antiThy1 GN.

=== Tumor suppression ===
It has also been proven to be a tumor suppressor for some tumors. It probably is aided by its action in upregulating thrombospondin, SPARC (osteonectin), and fibronectin. However it has also been speculated to aid in extravasation in circulating melanoma cells. In case of prostate cancer it has been shown to be expressed in cancer associated stroma but not in normal stroma and has been suggested to be of potential help for cancer specific drug targeting .

=== Role in cell adhesion, extravasation, migration ===
Acting through several integrins and probably a few yet unknown other receptors Thy-1 mediates adhesion of leukocytes and monocytes to endothelial cells and fibroblasts, melanoma cells to endothelium, and thymocytes to thymic epithelium. Thy1 expression comes on when endothelial cells are activated. It has been shown to interact with the leukocyte integrin Mac1 (CD11b/CD18) and may play a role in leukocyte homing and recruitment.

=== Modulating fibrosis ===
Role of Thy-1 in fibrosis and fibroblast differentiation may have some tissue variation. Thy1 knock out mice have increased fibrosis in the lung. Fibrosis induced by chemotherapeutic agent Bleomycin is also increased in these mice.

== Other roles ==
Thy-1 knock out mice also show impaired cutaneous immune responses and abnormal retinal development: thinning of the inner nuclear, inner plexiform, ganglion cell, and outer segment layers of the retina.

== Use in stem cell biology ==
Thy-1 can be considered as a surrogate marker for various kind of stem cells (e.g. hematopoietic stem cells or HSCs). It is one of the popular combinatorial surface markers for FACS for stem cells in combination with other markers like CD34. In humans, Thy-1 is expressed on neurons and HSCs among others. It is considered a major marker of HSC pluripotency in concordance with CD34. In human HSCs, Thy1 cells are all CD34 positive. Thy 1 is also a marker of other kind of stem cells, for example: mesenchymal stem cells, hepatic stem cells ("oval cells"), keratinocyte stem cells, putative endometrial progenitor/(?)stem cells.
