= PROM1 =

Protein found in humans

Identifiers
- Aliases: PROM1, AC133, CD133, CORD12, MCDR2, MSTP061, PROML1, RP41, STGD4, prominin 1
- External IDs: OMIM: 604365; MGI: 1100886; GeneCards: PROM1

Gene location (Human)
Chr.	Chromosome 4 (human)
Band	4p15.32	Start	15,963,076 bp
Band	4p15.32	End	16,084,378 bp

Gene location (Mouse)
Chr.	Chromosome 5 (mouse)
Band	5|5 B3	Start	44,150,962 bp
Band	5|5 B3	End	44,259,374 bp
RNA expression pattern
Bgee	Human / Mouse (ortholog); Top expressed in: bronchial epithelial cell; nasal epithelium; parotid gland; mucosa of paranasal sinus; olfactory zone of nasal mucosa; trachea; pylorus; renal medulla; mucosa of colon; mucosa of sigmoid colon / Top expressed in: conjunctival fornix; retinal pigment epithelium; seminal vesicula; neural layer of retina; epithelium of stomach; Paneth cell; pyloric antrum; mucous cell of stomach; corneal stroma; epithelium of lens; More reference expression data
BioGPS	n/a
Gene ontology
Molecular function	actinin binding; cadherin binding; protein binding; cholesterol binding
Cellular component	integral component of membrane; vesicle; cell projection; membrane; plasma membrane; photoreceptor outer segment; integral component of plasma membrane; cilium; cell surface; apical plasma membrane; endoplasmic reticulum; photoreceptor outer segment membrane; extracellular exosome; microvillus membrane; endoplasmic reticulum-Golgi intermediate compartment; extracellular space; microvillus; prominosome
Biological process	retina layer formation; camera-type eye photoreceptor cell differentiation; retina morphogenesis in camera-type eye; glomerular parietal epithelial cell differentiation; glomerular visceral epithelial cell differentiation; photoreceptor cell maintenance; positive regulation of nephron tubule epithelial cell differentiation
Sources:Amigo / QuickGO
Orthologs
Databases	NCBI: entry; OMA: entry
Species	Human	Mouse
Entrez	8842	19126
Ensembl	ENSG00000007062	ENSMUSG00000029086
UniProt	O43490	O54990
RefSeq (mRNA)	NM_001145847; NM_001145848; NM_001145849; NM_001145850; NM_001145851 NM_001145852; NM_006017; NM_001371406; NM_001371407; NM_001371408	NM_001163577; NM_001163578; NM_001163581; NM_001163582; NM_001163583 NM_001163584; NM_001163585; NM_008935
RefSeq (protein)	NP_001139319; NP_001139320; NP_001139321; NP_001139322; NP_001139323 NP_001139324; NP_006008; NP_001358335; NP_001358336; NP_001358337	NP_001157049; NP_001157050; NP_001157053; NP_001157054; NP_001157055 NP_001157056; NP_001157057; NP_032961
Location (UCSC)	Chr 4: 15.96 – 16.08 Mb	Chr 5: 44.15 – 44.26 Mb
PubMed search
- Wikidata
View/Edit Human	View/Edit Mouse

CD133 antigen, also known as prominin-1, is a glycoprotein that in humans is encoded by the PROM1 gene. It is a member of pentaspan transmembrane glycoproteins, which specifically localize to cellular protrusions. When embedded in the cell membrane, the membrane topology of prominin-1 is such that the N-terminus extends into the extracellular space and the C-terminus resides in the intracellular compartment. The protein consists of five transmembrane segments, with the first and second segments and the third and fourth segments connected by intracellular loops while the second and third as well as fourth and fifth transmembrane segments are connected by extracellular loops. While the precise function of CD133 remains unknown, it has been proposed that it acts as an organizer of cell membrane topology.

== Tissue distribution ==
CD133 is expressed in hematopoietic stem cells, endothelial progenitor cells, glioblastoma, neuronal and glial stem cells, various pediatric brain tumors, as well as adult kidney, mammary glands, trachea, salivary glands, uterus, placenta, digestive tract, testes, and some other cell types.

== Clinical significance ==
Today CD133 is the most commonly used marker for isolation of cancer stem cell (CSC) population from different tumors, mainly from various gliomas and carcinomas. Initial studies that showed ability of CD133-positive population to efficiently propagate tumor when injected into immune-compromised mice firstly were performed on brain tumors. However, subsequent studies have indicated the difficulty in isolating pure CSC populations. CD133^{+} melanoma cells are considered a subpopulation of CSC and play a critical role in recurrence. Moreover, CD133^{+} melanoma cells are immunogenic and can be used as an antimelanoma vaccination. In mice the vaccination with CD133^{+} melanoma cells mediated strong anti-tumor activity that resulted in the eradication of parental melanoma cells. In addition, it has also been shown that CD133^{+} melanoma cells preferentially express the RNA helicase DDX3X. As DDX3X also is an immunogenic protein, the same anti-melanoma vaccination strategy can be employed to give therapeutic antitumor immunity in mice.

== See also ==
- Stargardt disease
