= PTPRC =

Mammalian protein found in humans

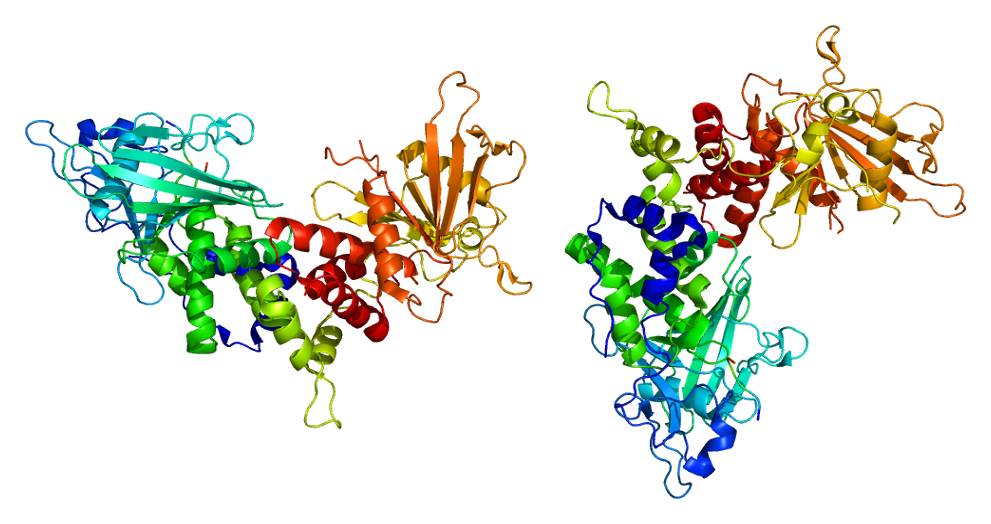

Identifiers
- Aliases: PTPRC, B220, CD45, CD45R, GP180, L-CA, LCA, LY5, T200, protein tyrosine phosphatase, receptor type C, protein tyrosine phosphatase receptor type C
- External IDs: OMIM: 151460; MGI: 97810; GeneCards: PTPRC
Available structures
PDB	Ortholog search: PDBe RCSB
PDB	List of PDB id codes 1YGU, 1YGR, 5FMV, 5FN6, 5FN7
Enzyme activity
EC #	BRENDA	ExPASy	KEGG	MetaCyc
3.1.3.48	↗	↗	↗	↗

Gene location (Human)
Chr.	Chromosome 1 (human)
Band	1q31.3-q32.1	Start	198,638,457 bp
Band	1q31.3-q32.1	End	198,757,476 bp

Gene location (Mouse)
Chr.	Chromosome 1 (mouse)
Band	1 E4|1 60.73 cM	Start	137,990,599 bp
Band	1 E4|1 60.73 cM	End	138,103,446 bp
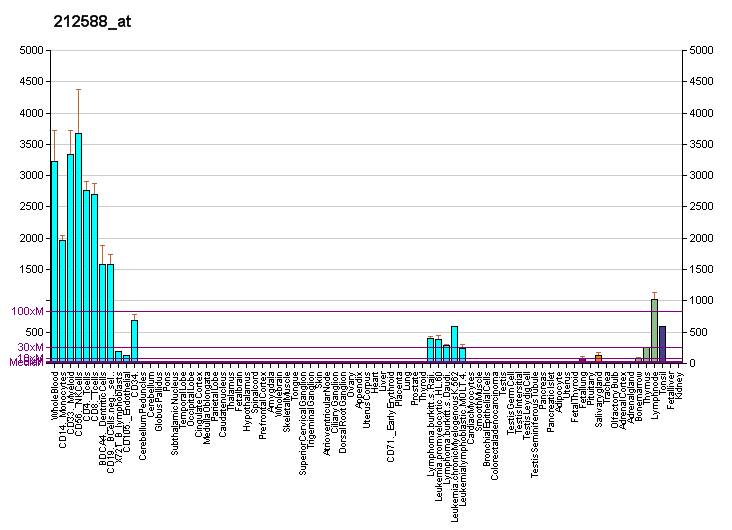

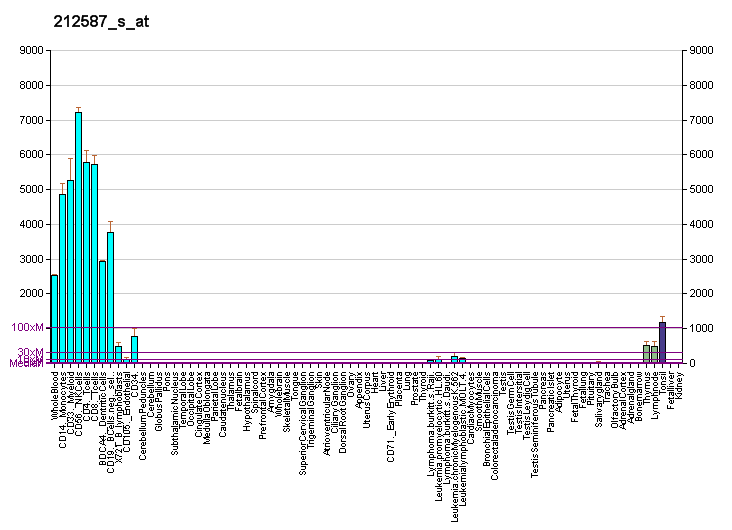

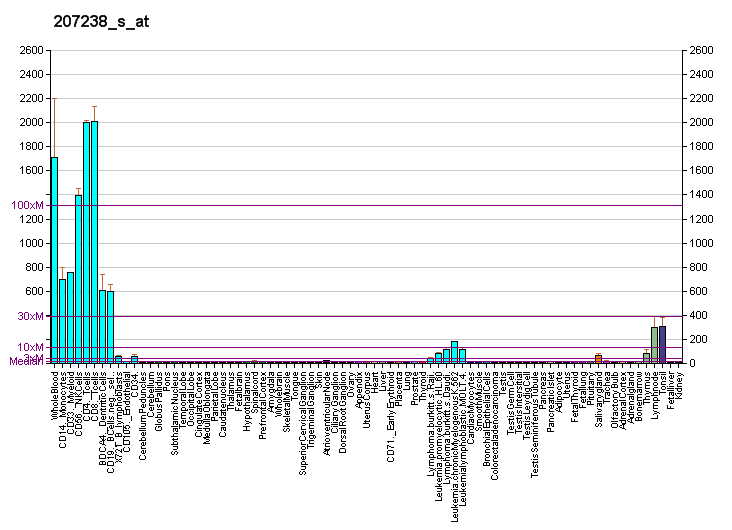
RNA expression pattern
Bgee	Human / Mouse (ortholog); Top expressed in: monocyte; appendix; blood; epithelium of nasopharynx; granulocyte; lymph node; bone marrow; bone marrow cell; thymus; spleen / Top expressed in: granulocyte; spleen; thymus; tibiofemoral joint; stroma of bone marrow; submandibular gland; blood; right lung; Paneth cell; mesenteric lymph nodes; More reference expression data
BioGPS	More reference expression data
Gene ontology
Molecular function	phosphoprotein phosphatase activity; phosphatase activity; protein binding; transmembrane receptor protein tyrosine phosphatase activity; protein kinase binding; hydrolase activity; protein tyrosine phosphatase activity
Cellular component	integral component of membrane; membrane; focal adhesion; plasma membrane; integral component of plasma membrane; cell surface; membrane raft; extracellular exosome; external side of plasma membrane; secretory granule membrane
Biological process	B cell receptor signaling pathway; cell cycle phase transition; release of sequestered calcium ion into cytosol; negative regulation of protein kinase activity; bone marrow development; stem cell development; protein dephosphorylation; negative regulation of cytokine-mediated signaling pathway; positive regulation of hematopoietic stem cell migration; regulation of cell cycle; negative regulation of cell adhesion involved in substrate-bound cell migration; negative regulation of T cell mediated cytotoxicity; cell surface receptor signaling pathway; B cell proliferation; T cell differentiation; positive regulation of B cell proliferation; defense response to virus; positive regulation of T cell proliferation; hematopoietic progenitor cell differentiation; positive regulation of antigen receptor-mediated signaling pathway; T cell receptor signaling pathway; positive regulation of stem cell proliferation; dephosphorylation; positive regulation of protein kinase activity; peptidyl-tyrosine dephosphorylation; neutrophil degranulation
Sources:Amigo / QuickGO
Orthologs
Databases	NCBI: entry; OMA: entry
Species	Human	Mouse
Entrez	5788	19264
Ensembl	ENSG00000081237; ENSG00000262418	ENSMUSG00000026395
UniProt	P08575	P06800
RefSeq (mRNA)	NM_001267798; NM_002838; NM_080921; NM_080922	NM_001111316; NM_001268286; NM_011210
RefSeq (protein)	NP_001254727; NP_002829; NP_563578; NP_563578.2; NP_002829.3	NP_001104786; NP_001255215; NP_035340
Location (UCSC)	Chr 1: 198.64 – 198.76 Mb	Chr 1: 137.99 – 138.1 Mb
PubMed search
- Wikidata
View/Edit Human	View/Edit Mouse

Protein tyrosine phosphatase, receptor type, C also known as PTPRC is an enzyme that, in humans, is encoded by the PTPRC gene. PTPRC is also known as CD45 antigen (CD stands for cluster of differentiation), which was originally called leukocyte common antigen (LCA).

PTPRC is a critical enzyme involved in regulating immune cell function. PTPRC is a transmembrane protein tyrosine phosphatase expressed on the surface of all nucleated hematopoietic cells, particularly lymphocytes. It plays a key role in the activation and differentiation of T cells, B cells, and other immune cells by modulating signaling pathways. It functions by dephosphorylating specific tyrosine residues on target proteins, thereby controlling various signaling processes essential for immune response and homeostasis.

== Function ==
The protein product of this gene, best known as CD45, is a member of the protein tyrosine phosphatase (PTP) family. PTPs are signaling molecules that regulate a variety of cellular processes including cell growth, differentiation, mitotic cycle, and oncogenic transformation. CD45 contains an extracellular domain, a single transmembrane segment, and two tandem intracytoplasmic catalytic domains, and thus belongs to the receptor type PTP family.

CD45 is a type I transmembrane protein that is present in various isoforms on all differentiated hematopoietic cells (except erythrocytes and plasma cells). CD45 has been shown to be an essential regulator of T- and B-cell antigen receptor signalling. It functions through either direct interaction with components of the antigen receptor complexes via its extracellular domain (a form of co-stimulation), or by activating various Src family kinases required for the antigen receptor signaling via its cytoplasmic domain. CD45 also suppresses JAK kinases, and so functions as a negative regulator of cytokine receptor signaling.

Many alternatively spliced transcripts variants of this gene, which encode distinct isoforms, have been reported. Antibodies against the different isoforms of CD45 are used in routine immunohistochemistry to differentiate between immune cell types, as well as to differentiate between histological sections from lymphomas and carcinomas.

== Isoforms ==
The CD45 protein family consists of multiple members that are all products of a single complex gene. This gene contains 34 exons, producing a massive protein with extracellular and cytoplasmic domains that are both unusually large. Exons 4, 5, and 6 (corresponding to protein regions A, B, and C) are alternatively spliced to generate up to eight different protein products featuring combinations of zero, one, two, or all three exons.

CD45's large extracellular domain is highly glycosylated, and these eight isoforms allow wide variation in the structure of its side chains. The isoforms affect the protein's N-terminal region, which extends linearly out from the cell and bears the O-linked glycan chains.

CD45 isoforms show cell-type and differentiation-stage specific expression, a pattern which is quite well conserved in mammals. These isoforms are often used as markers that identify and distinguish between different types of immune cells.

Naive T lymphocytes are typically positive for CD45RA, which includes only the A protein region. Activated and memory T lymphocytes express CD45RO, the shortest CD45 isoform, which lacks all three of the A, B, and C regions. This shortest isoform facilitates T cell activation.

CD45R (also known as CD45RABC) contains all three possible exons. It is the longest protein and migrates at 200 kDa when isolated from T cells. B cells also express CD45R with heavier glycosylation, bringing the molecular weight to 220 kDa, hence the name B220 (B cell isoform of 220 kDa).

== Interactions ==
PTPRC has been shown to interact with:

- GANAB,
- LYN,
- Lck, and
- SKAP1.

CD45 has been recently shown to interact with the HCMV UL11 protein. This interaction results in functional paralysis of T cells. In addition, CD45 was shown to be the target of the species D adenovirus 19a E3/49K protein to inhibit the activation of NK and T cells.

== Clinical importance ==
CD45 is a pan-leukocyte protein with tyrosine phosphatase activity involved in the regulation of signal transduction in hematopoiesis. CD45 does not colocalize with lipid rafts on murine and human non-transformed hematopoietic cells, but CD45 positioning within lipid rafts is modified during their oncogenic transformation to acute myeloid leukemia. CD45 colocalizes with lipid rafts on AML cells, which contributes to elevated GM-CSF signal intensity involved in proliferation of leukemic cells.

Therapies for blood cancer, including acute myeloid leukemia, have been proposed based on the concept of genetically modifying the CD45 of healthy cells, among other cell markers, to be immune to a treatment that kills all normal CD45 cells, including the cancerous ones. An antibody-drug conjugate exists that kills specifically cells with unaltered CD45, and "shielded" cells with modified CD45 have been developed that evade this. Blood stem cell transplants would be used to replace the original healthy blood cells with modified stem cells, and then the treatment would be applied.

== Use as a congenic marker ==
There are two identifiable alleles of CD45 in mice: CD45.1 (Ly5.1 historically) and CD45.2 (Ly5.2 historically). These two types of CD45 are believed to be functionally identical. As such, they are routinely used in scientific research to allow identification of cells. For instance, leukocytes can be transferred from a CD45.1 donor mouse, into a CD45.2 host mouse, and can be subsequently identified due to their expression of CD45.1. This technique is also routinely used when generating chimeras. An alternative system is the use of CD90 (Thy1) alleles, which CD90.1/CD90.2 system is used in the same manner as the CD45.1/CD45.2 system.

In 2016 a new knock-in mouse was generated on the C57BL/6 background to be a perfect congenic strain. This mouse, dubbed the CD45.1STEM mouse, differs from the C57BL/6 strain by a single base pair resulting in a single amino acid change that confers the difference in reactivity by the anti-CD45.1 and anti-CD45.2 antibodies. This strain was designed for competitive bone marrow transplantation assays and demonstrated perfect equivalence, unlike the previous standard, the "SJL" mouse, more formally known as Pep Boy.

== Bibliography ==
- Tchilian EZ, Beverley PC (2002). "CD45 in memory and disease". Archivum Immunologiae et Therapiae Experimentalis. 50 (2): 85–93. PMID 12022705.
- Ishikawa H, Tsuyama N, Abroun S, Liu S, Li FJ, Otsuyama K, et al. (September 2003). "Interleukin-6, CD45 and the src-kinases in myeloma cell proliferation". Leukemia & Lymphoma. 44 (9): 1477–1481. doi:10.3109/10428190309178767. PMID 14565647. S2CID 19867177.
- Stanton T, Boxall S, Bennett A, Kaleebu P, Watera C, Whitworth J, et al. (May 2004). "CD45 variant alleles: possibly increased frequency of a novel exon 4 CD45 polymorphism in HIV seropositive Ugandans". Immunogenetics. 56 (2): 107–110. doi:10.1007/s00251-004-0668-z. PMID 15057492. S2CID 10179258.
- Huntington ND, Tarlinton DM (July 2004). "CD45: direct and indirect government of immune regulation". Immunology Letters. 94 (3): 167–174. doi:10.1016/j.imlet.2004.05.011. PMID 15275963.
- Jameson R (2006). "CD45". Immunology course for undergraduates. Davidson College.
