= List of human cell types =

The list of human cell types provides an enumeration and description of the various specialized cells found within the human body, highlighting their distinct functions, characteristics, and contributions to overall physiological processes. Cells may be classified by their physiological function, histology (microscopic anatomy), lineage, or gene expression.

== Total number of cells ==
The adult human body is estimated to contain about 30 to 40 trillion (4×10^{13}) human cells, with the number varying between 20 and 100 trillion depending on factors such as sex, age, and weight. Additionally, there are approximately an equal number of bacterial cells. The exact count of human cells has not yet been empirically measured in its entirety and is estimated using different approaches based on smaller samples of empirical observation. It is generally assumed that these cells share features with each other and thus may be organized as belonging to a smaller number of types.

== Classification ==
As a definition of "cell type" is yet to be agreed, it is not possible yet to arrive at a precise number of human cell types. There is, for example, significant variation in these cell types depending on the specific surface proteins they possess.

An extensive listing of human cell types was published by Vickaryous and Hall in 2006, collecting 411 different types of human cells, including 145 types of neurons.

The Human Cell Atlas project, which started in 2016, had as one of its goals to "catalog all cell types (for example, immune cells or brain cells) and sub-types in the human body". By 2018, the Human Cell Atlas description had based the project on the assumption that "our characterization of the hundreds of types and subtypes of cells in the human body is limited", but the word hundreds was removed in later versions.

On 2021, Stephen Quake guessed that the upper limit of the number of human cell types would be around 6000, based on a reasoning that "if biologists had discovered only 5% of cell types in the human body, then the upper limit of cell types to discover is somewhere around 6000 (i.e., 300/0.05)."

Other different efforts have used different numbers. A count of cells in the human body published in 2023 divided the cells in about 400 types to perform the calculation.

The main cellular components of the human body by count
Cell type	% cell count
Red blood cells (Erythrocytes)	84.0
Platelets	4.9
Bone marrow cells	2.5
Vascular endothelial cells	2.1
Lymphocytes	1.5
Hepatocytes	0.8
Neurons and glia	0.6
Bronchial endothelial cells	0.5
Epidermal cells	0.5
Respiratory interstitial cells	0.5
Adipocytes (fat cells)	0.2
Dermal fibroblasts	0.1
Muscle cells	0.001
Other cells	2.0

In 1996, scientists revealed a 'map' of 16,000 human genes. This led to estimates that humans likely had around 100,000 genes (or regions that code for human proteins). However, actual sequencing did not start before around 1999, and it was not until 2003 that the first complete draft of a human genome revealed that there were roughly 20,000-25,000 protein-coding genes, as most DNA does not code for any protein. It is difficult to say that there have not been similar mistakes when estimating how many cells humans have as there are still substantial gaps in understanding human cells.

== Efforts to characterize all human cell types ==
Several efforts have been made to make a list or a map of all human cells. One of the largest and most recent is the HuBMAP (Human BioMolecular Atlas Program).

The HuBMAP project has organized 1551 different samples in 17 collections, each dedicated to a different system. However, this project still only mapped about 31 of the human body's 70 organs. Their datasets and visualisations place great emphasis on biomarkers and location in the body, but less on cell development and how cells can change over time. Usually specific surface proteins are used to identify cells, and based on this they are put into different categories.

Another major effort to make an overview of these proteins that allows us to observe cell types is the Human Protein Atlas.

A similar project, the Human Brain Project has also attempted to map the human brain, although much of the publicly accessible model does not have cellular resolution.

== Standards and naming conventions ==
So far not all cells which can be found in the human body have been documented. There is no good way to make the experiment where one checks if all cell types identified so far could be taken from and measured in a single donor, proving that the cell types are universal to all humans. This is partly due to a lack of standards, as scientists are still not entirely sure what is needed to measure, in order to capture every cell type which can be found.

Some attempts have been made – and some are still in progress– for creating standards for identifying cells consistently. The Cell Ontology provides arguably the most comprehensive metadata standard to date, cataloging over 2500 cell classes and being used actively by the Human Cell Atlas community.

There is still no standard which is used industry wide, nor any definitions which have been accepted by the wider scientific community, often making it difficult to say whether some collected and observed cells are really one or multiple types of cells. This lack of standards makes it difficult to estimate how many cell types and how many cells of each type can be found in the human body, as well as difficult to predict which young cells one would need to develop with mature cells. The list in this article also contains inconsistencies due to multiple sources using different conventions.

== List of human cell types ==
Cell type	Develops from	Tissue of origin	Function	Group	Subgroup	Germ layer of origin	Biomarkers
Brunner's gland cell	Duodenal gland progenitor	Duodenum (submucosa)	Secretes alkaline mucus to protect the duodenum	Exocrine secretory epithelial cells	Digestive epithelium	Endoderm	MUC6
Goblet cell	Endodermal epithelial progenitor	Respiratory tract and gastrointestinal tract	Secretes mucins	Exocrine secretory epithelial cells	Digestive epithelium	Endoderm	MUC2
Foveolar cell	Endodermal epithelial progenitor	Stomach	Secretes protective gastric mucus and bicarbonate	Exocrine secretory epithelial cells	Digestive epithelium	Endoderm	MUC5AC
Chief cell	Endodermal epithelial progenitor	Stomach	Secretes pepsinogen and gastric lipase	Exocrine secretory epithelial cells	Digestive epithelium	Endoderm	PGC
Parietal cell	Endodermal epithelial progenitor	Stomach	Secretes gastric acid and intrinsic factor	Exocrine secretory epithelial cells	Digestive epithelium	Endoderm	ATP4A, ATP4B
Pancreatic acinar cell	Endodermal epithelial progenitor	Pancreas	Secretes digestive enzymes	Exocrine secretory epithelial cells	Digestive epithelium	Endoderm	PRSS1, CPA1
Paneth cell	Endodermal epithelial progenitor	Small intestine	Secretes antimicrobial peptides and supports intestinal stem cells	Exocrine secretory epithelial cells	Digestive epithelium	Endoderm	LYZ, DEFA5
Hepatocyte	Hepatoblast	Liver	Metabolism, bile formation and plasma-protein synthesis	Exocrine secretory epithelial cells	Liver parenchyma	Endoderm	ALB, HNF4A
Cholangiocyte	Hepatoblast / ductal plate cell	Bile ducts	Modifies and conveys bile	Exocrine secretory epithelial cells	Biliary epithelium	Endoderm	KRT7, KRT19
Type II pneumocyte	Endodermal epithelial progenitor	Lung alveoli	Secretes pulmonary surfactant and replenishes alveolar epithelium	Exocrine secretory epithelial cells	Respiratory epithelium	Endoderm	SFTPC, SFTPB
Club cell	Endodermal epithelial progenitor	Bronchioles	Secretes protective proteins and metabolizes xenobiotics	Exocrine secretory epithelial cells	Respiratory epithelium	Endoderm	SCGB1A1
Ciliated airway cell	Airway basal progenitor	Respiratory tract	Moves airway mucus by ciliary beating	Barrier and transport epithelial cells	Airway epithelium	Endoderm	FOXJ1
Airway basal cell	Airway epithelial progenitor	Respiratory tract	Regenerates airway epithelium	Stem and progenitor cells	Airway epithelium	Endoderm	KRT5, TP63
Pulmonary neuroendocrine cell	Airway epithelial progenitor	Respiratory tract	Releases neuropeptides and senses airway stimuli	Hormone-secreting cells	Pulmonary neuroendocrine cells	Endoderm	CHGA, ASCL1
Pulmonary ionocyte	Airway basal progenitor	Respiratory tract	Regulates airway fluid and ion transport	Barrier and transport epithelial cells	Airway epithelium	Endoderm	CFTR, FOXI1
Pulmonary brush cell	Airway epithelial progenitor	Respiratory tract	Chemosensation and airway defense	Sensory transducer cells	Airway epithelium	Endoderm	POU2F3
Type I pneumocyte	Endodermal epithelial progenitor	Lung alveoli	Forms thin gas-exchange barrier	Barrier cell	Respiratory epithelium	Endoderm	AGER, PDPN
Neuroepithelial body cell	Pulmonary neuroendocrine cell	Airway epithelium	Clustered neuroendocrine sensing	Hormone-secreting cells	Airway epithelium	Endoderm	CHGA
Gall bladder epithelial cell	Endodermal epithelial progenitor	Gallbladder	Absorbs water and electrolytes; concentrates bile	Barrier cell	Digestive epithelium	Endoderm	
Tuft cell (intestinal)	Intestinal stem cell	Small intestine and colon	Chemosensation and type 2 immune signaling	Sensory transducer cells	Intestinal epithelium	Endoderm	POU2F3, DCLK1
Microfold cell (M cell)	Intestinal epithelial progenitor	Peyer's patch follicle-associated epithelium	Transports luminal antigens to immune cells	Barrier and transport epithelial cells	Intestinal epithelium	Endoderm	GP2, SPIB
Pancreatic duct cell	Endodermal epithelial progenitor	Pancreas ducts	Secretes bicarbonate-rich pancreatic fluid	Exocrine secretory epithelial cells	Digestive epithelium	Endoderm	
Centroacinar cell	Endodermal epithelial progenitor	Pancreas	Initiates pancreatic ductal bicarbonate secretion	Exocrine secretory epithelial cells	Digestive epithelium	Endoderm	
Enterocyte (intestinal brush-border cell)	Intestinal crypt stem cell	Small intestine	Absorbs nutrients via apical microvilli	Absorptive epithelial cells	Digestive epithelium	Endoderm	VIL1, ALPI
Colonocyte	Colonic crypt stem cell	Colon	Absorbs water and electrolytes	Barrier and transport epithelial cells	Colonic epithelium	Endoderm	KRT20, SLC26A3
Intestinal stem cell	Crypt stem cell	Intestinal crypt	Maintains intestinal epithelial renewal	Stem and progenitor cells	Intestinal epithelium	Endoderm	LGR5, OLFM4
Gastric stem cell	Gastric epithelial progenitor	Stomach glands	Renews gastric epithelium	Stem and progenitor cells	Gastric epithelium	Endoderm	LGR5
Gastric mucous neck cell	Gastric stem/progenitor cell	Stomach glands	Secretes mucus and contributes to chief-cell lineage	Exocrine secretory epithelial cells	Gastric epithelium	Endoderm	MUC6
Brunner's gland ductal cell	Duodenal gland progenitor	Duodenum	Conducts alkaline gland secretion	Barrier and transport epithelial cells	Duodenal gland	Endoderm	
K cell	Endodermal endocrine progenitor	Duodenum and jejunum	Secretes glucose-dependent insulinotropic polypeptide (GIP)	Hormone-secreting cells	Enteroendocrine cell	Endoderm	GIP
L cell	Endodermal endocrine progenitor	Ileum and colon	Secretes GLP-1, GLP-2 and peptide YY	Hormone-secreting cells	Enteroendocrine cell	Endoderm	GCG, PYY
I cell	Endodermal endocrine progenitor	Small intestine	Secretes cholecystokinin	Hormone-secreting cells	Enteroendocrine cell	Endoderm	CCK
G cell	Endodermal endocrine progenitor	Stomach antrum	Secretes gastrin	Hormone-secreting cells	Enteroendocrine cell	Endoderm	GAST
Enterochromaffin cell	Endodermal endocrine progenitor	Gastrointestinal tract	Secretes serotonin	Hormone-secreting cells	Enteroendocrine cell	Endoderm	TPH1, CHGA
Enterochromaffin-like cell	Endodermal endocrine progenitor	Stomach	Secretes histamine	Hormone-secreting cells	Enteroendocrine cell	Endoderm	HDC
N cell	Endodermal endocrine progenitor	Small intestine	Secretes neurotensin	Hormone-secreting cells	Enteroendocrine cell	Endoderm	NTS
S cell	Endodermal endocrine progenitor	Duodenum	Secretes secretin	Hormone-secreting cells	Enteroendocrine cell	Endoderm	SCT
D cell	Endodermal endocrine progenitor	Stomach, pancreas and intestine	Secretes somatostatin	Hormone-secreting cells	Enteroendocrine cell	Endoderm	SST
Motilin (Mo) cell	Endodermal endocrine progenitor	Small intestine	Secretes motilin	Hormone-secreting cells	Enteroendocrine cell	Endoderm	MLN
Thyroid follicular cell	Endodermal endocrine progenitor	Thyroid gland	Synthesizes and secretes thyroid hormones	Hormone-secreting cells	Thyroid gland cells	Endoderm	TG, TPO
Thyroid follicular stem/progenitor cell	Endodermal thyroid progenitor	Thyroid gland	Replenishes thyroid follicular epithelium	Stem and progenitor cells	Thyroid epithelium	Endoderm	
Parafollicular cell	Ultimopharyngeal body (pharyngeal pouch) progenitor	Thyroid gland	Secretes calcitonin	Hormone-secreting cells	Thyroid gland cells	Endoderm	CALCA
Parathyroid chief cell	Endodermal endocrine progenitor	Parathyroid gland	Secretes parathyroid hormone	Hormone-secreting cells	Parathyroid gland cells	Endoderm	PTH
Parathyroid oxyphil cell	Parathyroid chief cell	Parathyroid gland	Parathyroid cell of incompletely understood function	Hormone-secreting cells	Parathyroid gland cells	Endoderm	
Alpha cell	Endodermal endocrine progenitor	Pancreatic islets	Secretes glucagon	Hormone-secreting cells	Pancreatic islets (islets of Langerhans)	Endoderm	GCG
C cell precursor	Pharyngeal pouch progenitor	Thyroid gland	Precursor of calcitonin-producing C cells	Stem and progenitor cells	Thyroid endocrine cells	Endoderm	
Beta cell	Endodermal endocrine progenitor	Pancreatic islets	Secretes insulin and amylin	Hormone-secreting cells	Pancreatic islets (islets of Langerhans)	Endoderm	INS
Delta cell	Endodermal endocrine progenitor	Pancreatic islets	Secretes somatostatin	Hormone-secreting cells	Pancreatic islets (islets of Langerhans)	Endoderm	SST
Epsilon cell	Endodermal endocrine progenitor	Pancreatic islets	Secretes ghrelin	Hormone-secreting cells	Pancreatic islets (islets of Langerhans)	Endoderm	GHRL
PP cell (gamma cell)	Endodermal endocrine progenitor	Pancreatic islets	Secretes pancreatic polypeptide	Hormone-secreting cells	Pancreatic islets (islets of Langerhans)	Endoderm	PPY
Salivary gland mucous cell	Surface ectodermal glandular progenitor	Salivary glands	Secretes mucin-rich saliva	Exocrine secretory epithelial cells	Exocrine glands	Ectoderm	
Cortical thymic epithelial cell	Pharyngeal pouch endodermal progenitor	Thymus cortex	Supports positive selection of thymocytes	Supporting cells	Thymic epithelium	Endoderm	KRT8, KRT18
Medullary thymic epithelial cell	Pharyngeal pouch endodermal progenitor	Thymus medulla	Supports central T-cell tolerance	Supporting cells	Thymic epithelium	Endoderm	AIRE, KRT5
Hassall's corpuscle epithelial cell	Medullary thymic epithelial cell	Thymus medulla	Forms thymic corpuscles and supports thymocyte maturation	Supporting cells	Thymic epithelium	Endoderm	KRT5
Salivary gland serous cell	Surface ectodermal glandular progenitor	Salivary glands	Secretes enzyme-rich saliva	Exocrine secretory epithelial cells	Exocrine glands	Ectoderm	
Von Ebner's gland cell	Surface ectodermal glandular progenitor	Tongue	Secretes serous fluid around taste buds	Exocrine secretory epithelial cells	Exocrine glands	Ectoderm	
Mammary basal-myoepithelial cell	Mammary basal progenitor	Mammary gland	Contracts to eject milk	Contractile cells	Mammary epithelium	Ectoderm	low EpCAM, high CD49f
Mammary luminal hormone-sensing cell	Surface ectodermal or neural-crest progenitor	Mammary gland	Transduces hormone signals to other mammary gland cells. Transports milk through ducts.	Epithelial cells	Mammary epithelium	Ectoderm	High EpCAM, low CD49f
Mammary luminal secretory precursor cell	Surface ectodermal glandular progenitor	Mammary gland alveoli	Differentiate into lactocytes in preparation for lactation	Exocrine secretory epithelial cells	Mammary epithelium	Ectoderm	High EpCAM, high CD49f
Lactocyte	Mammary luminal secretory precursor	Mammary gland alveoli	Secretes milk	Exocrine secretory epithelial cells	Mammary epithelium	Ectoderm	LALBA, KRT8
Lacrimal gland secretory cell	Surface ectodermal glandular progenitor	Lacrimal gland	Secretes tear components	Exocrine secretory epithelial cells	Exocrine glands	Ectoderm	
Meibomian gland cell	Surface ectodermal glandular progenitor	Eyelid tarsus	Secretes meibum, the tear-film lipid layer	Exocrine secretory epithelial cells	Ocular adnexal gland	Ectoderm	PPARG
Ceruminous gland cell	Surface ectodermal glandular progenitor	External auditory canal	Secretes cerumen components	Exocrine secretory epithelial cells	Exocrine glands	Ectoderm	
Eccrine sweat gland dark cell	Surface ectodermal glandular progenitor	Skin	Secretes glycoproteins in sweat	Exocrine secretory epithelial cells	Exocrine glands	Ectoderm	
Eccrine sweat gland clear cell	Surface ectodermal glandular progenitor	Skin	Secretes aqueous electrolyte-rich sweat	Exocrine secretory epithelial cells	Exocrine glands	Ectoderm	
Apocrine sweat gland cell	Surface ectodermal glandular progenitor	Skin	Produces apocrine sweat	Exocrine secretory epithelial cells	Exocrine glands	Ectoderm	
Gland of Moll cell in eyelid	Surface ectodermal glandular progenitor	Eyelid	Produces modified apocrine secretion	Exocrine secretory epithelial cells	Exocrine glands	Ectoderm	
Sebaceous gland cell	Surface ectodermal glandular progenitor	Skin	Produces sebum	Exocrine secretory epithelial cells	Exocrine glands	Ectoderm	PPARG
Bowman's gland cell	Surface ectodermal glandular progenitor	Olfactory epithelium	Secretes fluid bathing olfactory epithelium	Exocrine secretory epithelial cells	Exocrine glands	Ectoderm	
Conjunctival goblet cell	Conjunctival epithelial progenitor	Conjunctiva	Secretes ocular-surface mucins	Exocrine secretory epithelial cells	Ocular surface	Ectoderm	MUC5AC
Corneal epithelial cell	Limbal stem cell	Cornea epithelium	Maintains transparent ocular surface	Barrier and transport epithelial cells	Ocular surface	Ectoderm	KRT3, KRT12
Limbal stem cell	Surface ectodermal progenitor	Corneal limbus	Replenishes corneal epithelium	Stem and progenitor cells	Ocular surface	Ectoderm	KRT15, TP63
Corticotropes	Rathke pouch endocrine progenitor	Anterior pituitary gland	ACTH and β-Endorphin secretion	Hormone-secreting cells	Anterior pituitary gland cells	Ectoderm	POMC
Gonadotropes	Rathke pouch endocrine progenitor	Anterior pituitary gland	LH and FSH secretion	Hormone-secreting cells	Anterior pituitary gland cells	Ectoderm	LHB, FSHB
Lactotropes	Rathke pouch endocrine progenitor	Anterior pituitary gland	Prolactin secretion	Hormone-secreting cells	Anterior pituitary gland cells	Ectoderm	PRL
Somatotropes	Rathke pouch endocrine progenitor	Anterior pituitary gland	Growth hormone secretion	Hormone-secreting cells	Anterior pituitary gland cells	Ectoderm	GH1
Somatomammotrophic cells	Rathke pouch endocrine progenitor	Anterior pituitary gland	Growth hormone and prolactin secretion	Hormone-secreting cells	Anterior pituitary gland cells	Ectoderm	GH1, PRL
Thyrotropes	Rathke pouch endocrine progenitor	Anterior pituitary gland	TSH secretion	Hormone-secreting cells	Anterior pituitary gland cells	Ectoderm	TSHB
Pituitary null cells	Rathke pouch endocrine progenitor	Anterior pituitary gland	No defining hormone secretion; heterogeneous category	Pituitary gland cells	Anterior pituitary gland cells	Ectoderm	
Melanotrope	Rathke pouch endocrine progenitor	Pars intermedia (rudimentary in adult humans)	Secretes melanocyte-stimulating hormone	Hormone-secreting cells	Pituitary cells	Ectoderm	POMC
Magnocellular neurosecretory cells	Neuroectodermal progenitor	Hypothalamus	secrete oxytocin and vasopressin	Hormone-secreting cells	Hypothalamic neurosecretory cells	Ectoderm	
Parvocellular neurosecretory cells	Neuroectodermal progenitor	Hypothalamus	secrete thyrotropin-releasing hormone (TRH), corticotropin-releasing hormone (CRH), vasopressin, oxytocin, neurotensin, and prolactin	Hormone-secreting cells	Hypothalamic neurosecretory cells	Ectoderm	
Chromaffin cells (adrenal gland)	Neural crest sympathoadrenal progenitor	Adrenal medulla	Synthesizes and secretes catecholamines	Hormone-secreting cells	Adrenal medulla neuroendocrine cells	Ectoderm	CHGA, TH
Pinealocyte	Neuroectodermal progenitor	Pineal gland	Secretes melatonin	Hormone-secreting cells	Pineal gland	Ectoderm (neuroectoderm)	AANAT
Keratinocyte	Surface ectodermal epidermal progenitor	Epidermis	Forms epidermal barrier	Epithelial cells	Skin and adnexa	Ectoderm	KRT1, KRT10
Spinous-layer keratinocyte	Basal keratinocyte	Epidermis stratum spinosum	Builds mechanical barrier	Epithelial cells	Epidermis	Ectoderm	KRT1, KRT10
Granular-layer keratinocyte	Spinous-layer keratinocyte	Epidermis stratum granulosum	Forms barrier lipids and cornified envelope	Epithelial cells	Epidermis	Ectoderm	FLG, LOR
Corneocyte	Granular-layer keratinocyte	Epidermis stratum corneum	Anucleate physical barrier	Epithelial cells	Epidermis	Ectoderm	FLG, KRT1
Epidermal basal cell (stem cell)	Epidermal basal stem cell	Epidermis basal layer	Replenishes epidermal keratinocytes	Stem and progenitor cells	Skin and adnexa	Ectoderm	KRT5, KRT14
Melanocyte	Neural crest melanoblast	Epidermis and hair follicle	Synthesizes melanin	Pigment cells	Skin and adnexa	Ectoderm (neural crest lineage)	MLANA, TYR
Trichocyte	Surface ectodermal or neural-crest progenitor	Hair follicle	Forms hair shaft	Hair follicle epithelial cells	Skin and adnexa	Ectoderm	
Medullary hair shaft cell	Trichocyte	Hair shaft	Forms a structural layer of the hair shaft	Epithelial cells	Skin and adnexa	Ectoderm	
Cortical hair shaft cell	Trichocyte	Hair shaft	Forms a structural layer of the hair shaft	Epithelial cells	Skin and adnexa	Ectoderm	
Cuticular hair shaft cell	Trichocyte	Hair shaft	Forms a structural layer of the hair shaft	Epithelial cells	Skin and adnexa	Ectoderm	
Huxley's layer hair root sheath cell	Trichocyte	Hair follicle	Forms and supports the hair root sheath	Epithelial cells	Skin and adnexa	Ectoderm	
Henle's layer hair root sheath cell	Trichocyte	Hair follicle	Forms and supports the hair root sheath	Epithelial cells	Skin and adnexa	Ectoderm	
Outer root sheath hair cell	Trichocyte	Hair follicle	Forms and supports the hair root sheath	Epithelial cells	Skin and adnexa	Ectoderm	
Surface epithelial cell	Surface ectodermal or neural-crest progenitor	cornea, tongue, mouth, nasal cavity, distal anal canal, distal urethra, and distal vagina	Protects mucosal surface	Epithelial cells	Surface epithelium	Ectoderm	
Nail matrix keratinocyte	Epidermal basal progenitor	Nail matrix	Produces nail plate	Epithelial cells	Nail apparatus	Ectoderm	KRT6, KRT16
Basal epithelial cell (stem cell)	Surface ectodermal or neural-crest progenitor	cornea, tongue, mouth, nasal cavity, distal anal canal, distal urethra, and distal vagina	Renews stratified epithelium	Epithelial cells	Surface epithelium	Ectoderm	
Striated duct cell	Surface ectodermal or neural-crest progenitor	(salivary glands)	Modifies salivary electrolyte composition	Epithelial cells	Surface epithelium	Ectoderm	
Ameloblast	Surface ectodermal or neural-crest progenitor	Tooth enamel surface	Deposits enamel matrix	Epithelial cells	Oral epithelium and teeth	Ectoderm	AMELX
Odontoblast	Neural crest ectomesenchymal progenitor	Dental pulp	Forms dentin	Oral cells	Oral epithelium and teeth	Ectoderm (neural crest lineage)	DSPP
Cementoblast	Neural crest ectomesenchymal progenitor	Tooth cementum	Forms tooth cementum	Oral cells	Oral epithelium and teeth	Ectoderm (neural crest lineage)	
Dental pulp stem cell	Neural crest ectomesenchyme	Dental pulp	Produces dental pulp mesenchymal lineages	Stem and progenitor cells	Tooth	Ectoderm (neural crest)	THY1, NT5E
Cementocyte	Cementoblast	Tooth cementum	Maintains cementum matrix	Extracellular matrix cells	Tooth	Ectoderm (neural crest)	
Periodontal ligament stem cell	Neural crest ectomesenchyme	Periodontal ligament	Maintains periodontal connective tissue	Stem and progenitor cells	Tooth	Ectoderm (neural crest)	THY1
Auditory inner hair cells of organ of Corti	Otic placode epithelial progenitor	Cochlea	Transduces sound	Sensory transducer cells	Special sensory cells	Ectoderm	
Auditory outer hair cells of organ of Corti	Otic placode epithelial progenitor	Cochlea	Amplifies cochlear vibration	Sensory transducer cells	Special sensory cells	Ectoderm	
Spiral ganglion neuron	Otic placode neural progenitor	Cochlea	Relays hearing information to brainstem	Sensory neurons	Auditory pathway	Ectoderm	NEFH
Basal cells of olfactory epithelium	Olfactory basal progenitor	Olfactory epithelium	Renews olfactory epithelium	Stem and progenitor cells	Special sensory cells	Ectoderm	
Horizontal basal cell	Olfactory epithelial progenitor	Olfactory epithelium	Quiescent stem cell for epithelial repair	Stem and progenitor cells	Olfactory epithelium	Ectoderm	KRT5, TP63
Globose basal cell	Olfactory epithelial progenitor	Olfactory epithelium	Produces olfactory receptor neurons	Stem and progenitor cells	Olfactory epithelium	Ectoderm	ASCL1
Cold-sensitive primary sensory neurons	Neuroectodermal or neural-crest progenitor	Dorsal root ganglion	Detects cooling	Sensory transducer cells	Special sensory cells	Ectoderm	
Heat-sensitive primary sensory neurons	Neuroectodermal or neural-crest progenitor	Dorsal root ganglion	Detects warmth	Sensory transducer cells	Special sensory cells	Ectoderm	
Merkel cells of epidermis	Neuroectodermal or neural-crest progenitor	Epidermis	Mechanosensory signaling	Sensory transducer cells	Special sensory cells	Ectoderm	
Olfactory receptor neurons	Neuroectodermal or neural-crest progenitor	Olfactory epithelium	Detects odorants	Sensory transducer cells	Special sensory cells	Ectoderm	OR family, OMP
Pain-sensitive primary sensory neurons	Neuroectodermal or neural-crest progenitor	Dorsal root ganglion	Detects tissue damage	Sensory transducer cells	Special sensory cells	Ectoderm	
Photoreceptor rod cells	Neuroectodermal or neural-crest progenitor	Retina	Scotopic vision	Sensory transducer cells	Photoreceptor cells of retina in eye	Ectoderm	RHO
Photoreceptor blue-sensitive cone cells of eye	Neuroectodermal or neural-crest progenitor	Retina	Short-wavelength color vision	Sensory transducer cells	Photoreceptor cells of retina in eye	Ectoderm	OPN1SW
Photoreceptor green-sensitive cone cells of eye	Neuroectodermal or neural-crest progenitor	Retina	Medium-wavelength color vision	Sensory transducer cells	Photoreceptor cells of retina in eye	Ectoderm	OPN1MW
Photoreceptor red-sensitive cone cells of eye	Neuroectodermal or neural-crest progenitor	Retina	Long-wavelength color vision	Sensory transducer cells	Photoreceptor cells of retina in eye	Ectoderm	OPN1LW
Proprioceptive primary sensory neurons	Neuroectodermal or neural-crest progenitor	Dorsal root ganglion	Detects muscle and joint position	Sensory transducer cells	Special sensory cells	Ectoderm	
Touch-sensitive primary sensory neurons	Neuroectodermal or neural-crest progenitor	Dorsal root ganglion	Detects touch	Sensory transducer cells	Special sensory cells	Ectoderm	
Chemoreceptor glomus cells of carotid body cell	Neural crest progenitor	Carotid body	Senses arterial oxygen, carbon dioxide and pH	Sensory transducer cells	Special sensory cells	Ectoderm (neural crest lineage)	CHGA
Type I vestibular hair cell	Otic placode epithelial progenitor	Vestibular system	Detects acceleration and gravity	Sensory transducer cells	Special sensory cells	Ectoderm	
Type II vestibular hair cell	Otic placode epithelial progenitor	Vestibular system	Detects acceleration and gravity	Sensory transducer cells	Special sensory cells	Ectoderm	
Taste receptor cells of taste bud	Taste-bud basal progenitor	Taste bud	Transduces tastants	Sensory transducer cells	Special sensory cells	Ectoderm or endoderm (by tongue region)	
Type I taste cell	Taste-bud basal progenitor	Taste bud	Glial-like support and ionic homeostasis	Sensory transducer cells	Taste bud	Ectoderm	ENTPD2
Type II taste cell	Taste-bud basal progenitor	Taste bud	Transduces sweet, bitter and umami	Sensory transducer cells	Taste bud	Ectoderm	TRPM5
Type III taste cell	Taste-bud basal progenitor	Taste bud	Transduces sour and releases serotonin	Sensory transducer cells	Taste bud	Ectoderm	OTOP1, PKD2L1
Cholinergic neurons (various types)	Neuroectodermal or neural-crest progenitor	Autonomic nervous system	Releases acetylcholine	Autonomic neuron cells	Autonomic nervous system	Ectoderm	
Adrenergic neural cells (various types)	Neuroectodermal or neural-crest progenitor	Autonomic nervous system	Releases norepinephrine	Autonomic neuron cells	Autonomic nervous system	Ectoderm	
Peptidergic neural cells (various types)	Neuroectodermal or neural-crest progenitor	Autonomic nervous system	Releases neuropeptides	Autonomic neuron cells	Autonomic nervous system	Ectoderm	
Inner pillar cells of organ of Corti	Otic placode epithelial progenitor	Organ of Corti	Supports organ of Corti architecture	Sense organ and peripheral neuron supporting cells	Sensory organ and peripheral glia	Ectoderm	
Outer pillar cell	Otic placode epithelial progenitor	Organ of Corti	Supports organ of Corti architecture	Sense organ and peripheral neuron supporting cells	Sensory organ and peripheral glia	Ectoderm	
Inner phalangeal cell	Otic placode epithelial progenitor	Organ of Corti	Supports inner hair cells	Sense organ and peripheral neuron supporting cells	Sensory organ and peripheral glia	Ectoderm	
Outer phalangeal cell	Otic placode epithelial progenitor	Organ of Corti	Supports outer hair cells	Sense organ and peripheral neuron supporting cells	Sensory organ and peripheral glia	Ectoderm	
Border cell	Otic placode epithelial progenitor	Organ of Corti	Supports inner hair cells	Sense organ and peripheral neuron supporting cells	Sensory organ and peripheral glia	Ectoderm	
Hensen's cells of organ of Corti	Otic placode epithelial progenitor	Organ of Corti	Supports organ of Corti	Sense organ and peripheral neuron supporting cells	Sensory organ and peripheral glia	Ectoderm	
Deiters' cell	Otic epithelial progenitor	Organ of Corti	Supports outer hair cells	Sense organ and peripheral neuron supporting cells	Cochlear supporting cells	Ectoderm	
Claudius cell	Otic epithelial progenitor	Organ of Corti	Supports lateral cochlear epithelium	Sense organ and peripheral neuron supporting cells	Cochlear supporting cells	Ectoderm	
Böttcher cell	Otic epithelial progenitor	Cochlea	Supports cochlear epithelium	Sense organ and peripheral neuron supporting cells	Cochlear supporting cells	Ectoderm	
Vestibular supporting cell	Otic placode epithelial progenitor	Vestibular system	Supports vestibular sensory epithelium	Sense organ and peripheral neuron supporting cells	Sensory organ and peripheral glia	Ectoderm	
Taste bud supporting cell	Neuroectodermal or neural-crest progenitor	Taste bud	Supports taste receptor cells	Sense organ and peripheral neuron supporting cells	Sensory organ and peripheral glia	Ectoderm	
Olfactory sustentacular cell	Neuroectodermal or neural-crest progenitor	Olfactory epithelium	Supports olfactory neurons	Sense organ and peripheral neuron supporting cells	Sensory organ and peripheral glia	Ectoderm	
Sustentacular cell	Olfactory epithelial progenitor	Olfactory epithelium	Supports olfactory neurons	Sense organ and peripheral neuron supporting cells	Olfactory epithelium	Ectoderm	CYP2A13
Olfactory ensheathing cells	Neural crest glial progenitor	Olfactory nerve	Ensheathes olfactory axons	Sense organ and peripheral neuron supporting cells	Sensory organ and peripheral glia	Ectoderm (neural crest lineage)	S100B
Schwann cells	Neural crest glial progenitor	Peripheral nervous system	Myelinates or supports peripheral axons	Sense organ and peripheral neuron supporting cells	Sensory organ and peripheral glia	Ectoderm (neural crest lineage)	SOX10, S100B
Satellite glial cells	Neural crest glial progenitor	Peripheral ganglion	Supports peripheral ganglion neurons	Sense organ and peripheral neuron supporting cells	Sensory organ and peripheral glia	Ectoderm (neural crest lineage)	S100B
Enteric glial cell	Neural crest glial progenitor	Enteric nervous system	Supports enteric neurons	Sense organ and peripheral neuron supporting cells	Sensory organ and peripheral glia	Ectoderm (neural crest lineage)	
Enteric neuron	Neural crest progenitor	Enteric nervous system	Controls gastrointestinal motility and secretion	Peripheral neurons	Enteric nervous system	Ectoderm (neural crest)	ELAVL4
Myenteric neuron	Neural crest progenitor	Myenteric plexus	Coordinates intestinal motility	Peripheral neurons	Enteric nervous system	Ectoderm (neural crest)	
Submucosal neuron	Neural crest progenitor	Submucosal plexus	Regulates epithelial secretion and blood flow	Peripheral neurons	Enteric nervous system	Ectoderm (neural crest)	
Oligodendrocyte progenitor cell	Neuroectodermal progenitor	Central nervous system	Produces oligodendrocytes	Stem and progenitor cells	CNS glia	Ectoderm (neuroectoderm)	PDGFRA, CSPG4
Radial glia	Neural progenitor	Developing brain	Produces neurons and glia	Stem and progenitor cells	CNS glia	Ectoderm (neuroectoderm)	PAX6, SOX2
Neural stem cell	Neuroectodermal progenitor	Neurogenic CNS regions	Generates neural lineages	Stem and progenitor cells	CNS	Ectoderm (neuroectoderm)	SOX2, NES
Basket cells	Neural progenitor	Cerebellar cortex	Inhibitory cerebellar interneuron	Central nervous system neurons and glial cells	Neuron — Interneuron	Ectoderm	
Cartwheel cells	Neural progenitor	Dorsal cochlear nucleus	Inhibitory cochlear interneuron	Central nervous system neurons and glial cells	Neuron — Interneuron	Ectoderm	
Stellate cells	Neural progenitor	Cerebellum and cerebral cortex	Local inhibitory interneuron	Central nervous system neurons and glial cells	Neuron — Interneuron	Ectoderm	
Golgi cells	Neural progenitor	Cerebellum	Inhibitory cerebellar interneuron	Central nervous system neurons and glial cells	Neuron — Interneuron	Ectoderm	
Granule cells	Neural progenitor	Cerebellum and dentate gyrus	Small neuron integrating local circuit input	Central nervous system neurons and glial cells	Neuron — Interneuron	Ectoderm	
Lugaro cells	Neural progenitor	Cerebellum	Inhibitory cerebellar interneuron	Central nervous system neurons and glial cells	Neuron — Interneuron	Ectoderm	
Unipolar brush cells	Neural progenitor	Cerebellum	Excitatory cerebellar interneuron	Central nervous system neurons and glial cells	Neuron — Interneuron	Ectoderm	
Martinotti cells	Neural progenitor	Cerebral cortex	Inhibitory cortical interneuron	Central nervous system neurons and glial cells	Neuron — Interneuron	Ectoderm	
Chandelier cells	Neural progenitor	Cerebral cortex	Axon-initial-segment inhibition	Central nervous system neurons and glial cells	Neuron — Interneuron	Ectoderm	
Cajal–Retzius cells	Neural progenitor	Cerebral cortex	Layer I cortical developmental signaling	Central nervous system neurons and glial cells	Neuron — Interneuron	Ectoderm	
Double-bouquet cells	Neural progenitor	Cerebral cortex	Inhibitory cortical interneuron	Central nervous system neurons and glial cells	Neuron — Interneuron	Ectoderm	
Neurogliaform cells	Neural progenitor	Cerebral cortex	Inhibitory cortical interneuron	Central nervous system neurons and glial cells	Neuron — Interneuron	Ectoderm	
Retina horizontal cells	Neural progenitor	Retina	Integrates retinal photoreceptor signals laterally	Central nervous system neurons and glial cells	Neuron — Interneuron	Ectoderm	CALB1
Retina amacrine cell	Retinal progenitor	Retina	Modulates bipolar-to-ganglion signaling	Central nervous system neurons and glial cells	Neuron — retinal interneuron	Ectoderm (neuroectoderm)	
Retina bipolar cell	Retinal progenitor	Retina	Relays photoreceptor signals to ganglion cells	Central nervous system neurons and glial cells	Neuron — retinal interneuron	Ectoderm (neuroectoderm)	VSX2
Rod bipolar cell	Retinal progenitor	Retina	Relays scotopic rod signals	Central nervous system neurons and glial cells	Neuron — retinal interneuron	Ectoderm (neuroectoderm)	PRKCA
Cone bipolar cell	Retinal progenitor	Retina	Relays cone signals	Central nervous system neurons and glial cells	Neuron — retinal interneuron	Ectoderm (neuroectoderm)	
Retinal ganglion cell	Retinal progenitor	Retina	Projects visual information through optic nerve	Central nervous system neurons and glial cells	Neuron — retinal projection neuron	Ectoderm (neuroectoderm)	POU4F1
Intrinsically photosensitive retinal ganglion cell	Retinal ganglion progenitor	Retina	Signals ambient light for circadian rhythm and pupil reflex	Central nervous system neurons and glial cells	Neuron — retinal projection neuron	Ectoderm (neuroectoderm)	OPN4
Starburst amacrine cells	Neural progenitor	Retina	Cholinergic direction-selective retinal circuit	Central nervous system neurons and glial cells	Neuron — Interneuron	Ectoderm	
Renshaw cells	Neural progenitor	Spinal cord	Feedback inhibition of spinal motor neurons	Central nervous system neurons and glial cells	Neuron — Interneuron	Ectoderm	
Spindle neurons	Neural progenitor	Anterior cingulate cortex and insular cortex	Long-range cortical signaling	Central nervous system neurons and glial cells	Neuron — principal neuron	Ectoderm	
Fork cells	Neural progenitor	Cerebral cortex	Cortical projection neuron	Central nervous system neurons and glial cells	Neuron — principal neuron	Ectoderm	
Place cells	Neural progenitor	Hippocampus	Encodes location	Central nervous system neurons and glial cells	Neuron — principal neuron	Ectoderm	
Grid cells	Neural progenitor	Entorhinal cortex	Encodes spatial grid	Central nervous system neurons and glial cells	Neuron — principal neuron	Ectoderm	
Speed cells	Neural progenitor	Entorhinal cortex	Encodes movement speed	Central nervous system neurons and glial cells	Neuron — principal neuron	Ectoderm	
Head direction cells	Neural progenitor	Thalamus and limbic areas	Encodes head orientation	Central nervous system neurons and glial cells	Neuron — principal neuron	Ectoderm	
Betz cells	Neural progenitor	Primary motor cortex	Large upper motor neuron	Central nervous system neurons and glial cells	Neuron — principal neuron	Ectoderm	
Boundary cells	Neural progenitor	Entorhinal cortex	Responds to environmental boundaries	Central nervous system neurons and glial cells	Neuron — principal neuron	Ectoderm	
Bushy cells	Neural progenitor	Cochlear nucleus	Relays auditory input	Central nervous system neurons and glial cells	Neuron — principal neuron	Ectoderm	
Purkinje cells	Neural progenitor	Cerebellum	Inhibitory output from cerebellar cortex	Central nervous system neurons and glial cells	Neuron — principal neuron	Ectoderm	CALB1
Medium spiny neurons	Neural progenitor	Striatum	GABAergic striatal projection neuron	Central nervous system neurons and glial cells	Neuron — principal neuron	Ectoderm	PPP1R1B
Pyramidal cell	Neural progenitor	Cerebral cortex and hippocampus	Excitatory projection neuron	Central nervous system neurons and glial cells	Neuron — principal neuron	Ectoderm (neuroectoderm)	SLC17A7
Dentate granule cell	Neural progenitor	Dentate gyrus	Excitatory hippocampal input processing	Central nervous system neurons and glial cells	Neuron — principal neuron	Ectoderm (neuroectoderm)	PROX1
Cerebellar granule cell	Neural progenitor	Cerebellum	Excitatory input to Purkinje cells	Central nervous system neurons and glial cells	Neuron — interneuron	Ectoderm (neuroectoderm)	GABRA6
Motor neuron	Neural progenitor	Spinal cord and brainstem	Drives muscle contraction	Central nervous system neurons and glial cells	Neuron — motor neuron	Ectoderm (neuroectoderm)	CHAT
Serotonergic neuron	Neural progenitor	Brainstem raphe nuclei	Releases serotonin	Central nervous system neurons and glial cells	Neuron — neuromodulatory neuron	Ectoderm (neuroectoderm)	TPH2
Dopaminergic neuron	Neural progenitor	Substantia nigra and other CNS nuclei	Releases dopamine	Central nervous system neurons and glial cells	Neuron — neuromodulatory neuron	Ectoderm (neuroectoderm)	TH
Cholinergic neuron	Neural progenitor	CNS and peripheral nervous system	Releases acetylcholine	Central nervous system neurons and glial cells	Neuron — neuromodulatory neuron	Ectoderm (neuroectoderm)	CHAT
Astrocytes	Neuroectodermal progenitor	Central nervous system	Supports neurons and regulates extracellular milieu	Central nervous system neurons and glial cells	Neuroglia	Ectoderm	GFAP, AQP4
Oligodendrocytes	Oligodendrocyte precursor cell	Central nervous system	Myelinates central nervous system axons	Central nervous system neurons and glial cells	Neuroglia	Ectoderm	MBP, PLP1
Tanycytes	Neural progenitor	Hypothalamus	Interfaces cerebrospinal fluid with hypothalamus	Central nervous system neurons and glial cells	Neuroglia	Ectoderm	
Pituicytes	Neural progenitor	Posterior pituitary gland	Supports neurohypophysis	Central nervous system neurons and glial cells	Neuroglia	Ectoderm	
Ependymal cell	Neuroectodermal progenitor	Brain ventricles and spinal canal	Lines and moves cerebrospinal fluid	Central nervous system neurons and glial cells	Neuroglia	Ectoderm (neuroectoderm)	FOXJ1
Müller glia	Retinal progenitor	Retina	Supports retinal neurons and ionic balance	Central nervous system neurons and glial cells	Neuroglia	Ectoderm (neuroectoderm)	RLBP1, GLUL
Retinal pigment epithelium cell	Optic-cup neuroectoderm	Retina outer layer	Phagocytoses outer segments and supports photoreceptors	Barrier and transport epithelial cells	Retinal epithelium	Ectoderm (neuroectoderm)	RPE65, BEST1
Anterior lens epithelial cell	Neural progenitor	Lens	Produces lens fiber cells	Lens cells	Lens epithelium and fibers	Ectoderm	
Crystallin-containing lens fiber cell	Neural progenitor	Lens	Refracts light	Lens cells	Lens epithelium and fibers	Ectoderm	
White fat cell	Mesodermal mesenchymal or epithelial progenitor	Adipose tissue	Energy storage and adipokine secretion	Metabolism and storage cells	Adipocytes	Mesoderm	LEP, ADIPOQ
Brown adipocyte	Brown adipocyte progenitor	Brown adipose tissue	Thermogenesis via UCP1	Metabolism and storage cells	Adipocytes	Mesoderm	UCP1
Beige adipocyte	White adipocyte / progenitor	Adipose tissue	Inducible thermogenesis	Metabolism and storage cells	Adipocytes	Mesoderm	UCP1
Zona glomerulosa cell	Mesodermal mesenchymal or epithelial progenitor	Adrenal cortex	produce mineralocorticoids	Secretory cells	Cells of the adrenal cortex	Mesoderm	CYP11B2
Zona fasciculata cell	Mesodermal mesenchymal or epithelial progenitor	Adrenal cortex	Produces glucocorticoids	Secretory cells	Cells of the adrenal cortex	Mesoderm	CYP11B1
Zona reticularis cell	Mesodermal mesenchymal or epithelial progenitor	Adrenal cortex	Produces adrenal androgens	Secretory cells	Cells of the adrenal cortex	Mesoderm	CYP17A1
Adrenocortical progenitor	Adrenal cortical stem cell	Adrenal cortex	Renews steroidogenic cortex	Stem and progenitor cells	Adrenal gland	Mesoderm	NR5A1
Theca interna cell	Mesodermal mesenchymal or epithelial progenitor	Ovarian follicle	Produces androgens that granulosa cells convert to estrogens	Secretory cells	Reproductive endocrine and glandular cells	Mesoderm	
Corpus luteum cell	Mesodermal mesenchymal or epithelial progenitor	Corpus luteum	Produces progesterone	Secretory cells	Reproductive endocrine and glandular cells	Mesoderm	
Granulosa lutein cells	Mesodermal mesenchymal or epithelial progenitor	Corpus luteum	Produces progesterone	Secretory cells	Corpus luteum cell	Mesoderm	
Theca lutein cells	Mesodermal mesenchymal or epithelial progenitor	Corpus luteum	Produces progesterone and androgens	Secretory cells	Corpus luteum cell	Mesoderm	
Leydig cell	Mesodermal mesenchymal or epithelial progenitor	Testis	Produces testosterone	Secretory cells	Reproductive endocrine and glandular cells	Mesoderm	STAR, CYP17A1
Theca externa cell	Ovarian stromal progenitor	Ovarian follicle	Structural support around follicle	Extracellular matrix and stromal cells	Ovarian stroma	Mesoderm	
Seminal vesicle cell	Mesodermal mesenchymal or epithelial progenitor	Seminal vesicle	Secretes fructose-rich seminal fluid	Secretory cells	Reproductive endocrine and glandular cells	Mesoderm	
Prostate gland cell	Urogenital sinus epithelial progenitor	Prostate	Secretes prostatic fluid	Secretory cells	Reproductive endocrine and glandular cells	Endoderm (prostatic epithelium)	
Bulbourethral gland cell	Mesodermal mesenchymal or epithelial progenitor	Bulbourethral gland	Secretes lubricating mucus	Secretory cells	Reproductive endocrine and glandular cells	Endoderm (urogenital sinus epithelium)	
Bartholin's gland cell	Mesodermal mesenchymal or epithelial progenitor	Bartholin gland	Secretes vestibular mucus	Secretory cells	Reproductive endocrine and glandular cells	Endoderm (urogenital sinus epithelium)	
Gland of Littré cell	Mesodermal mesenchymal or epithelial progenitor	Urethral gland	Secretes urethral mucus	Secretory cells	Reproductive endocrine and glandular cells	Endoderm (urogenital sinus epithelium)	
Uterus endometrium cell	Mesodermal mesenchymal or epithelial progenitor	Endometrium	Secretes endometrial glandular fluid	Secretory cells	Reproductive endocrine and glandular cells	Mesoderm	
Endometrial stromal cell	Uterine mesenchymal progenitor	Endometrium stroma	Decidualizes in response to progesterone	Extracellular matrix and stromal cells	Endometrial stroma	Mesoderm	HOXA10
Endometrial gland cell	Müllerian epithelial progenitor	Endometrium glands	Secretes nutrients and growth factors	Exocrine secretory epithelial cells	Uterine gland	Mesoderm	KRT8, PAX8
Juxtaglomerular cell	Mesodermal mesenchymal or epithelial progenitor	Renal afferent arteriole	Secretes renin	Secretory cells	Kidney and urinary tract	Mesoderm	REN
Macula densa cell	Mesodermal mesenchymal or epithelial progenitor	Distal convoluted tubule	Senses tubular NaCl and signals to juxtaglomerular cells	Renal sensing and supporting cells	Kidney and urinary tract	Mesoderm	NOS1
Peripolar cell	Mesodermal mesenchymal or epithelial progenitor	Kidney glomerular pole	Secretory cell at glomerular vascular pole; exact function uncertain	Renal sensing and supporting cells	Kidney and urinary tract	Mesoderm	
Mesangial cell	Mesodermal mesenchymal or epithelial progenitor	Glomerulus	Supports glomerular capillaries and regulates matrix and flow	Renal sensing and supporting cells	Kidney and urinary tract	Mesoderm	
Extraglomerular mesangial cell	Renal mesenchymal progenitor	Juxtaglomerular apparatus	Supports macula densa–arteriole signaling	Renal sensing and supporting cells	Mesangial cells	Mesoderm	
Glomerular mesangial cell	Renal mesenchymal progenitor	Glomerulus	Supports capillary loops and clears matrix	Renal sensing and supporting cells	Mesangial cells	Mesoderm	PDGFRB
Parietal epithelial cell	Metanephric epithelial progenitor	Bowman's capsule	Lines parietal Bowman capsule	Barrier and transport epithelial cells	Kidney and urinary tract	Mesoderm	
Podocyte	Podocyte precursor	Glomerulus	Forms glomerular filtration slits	Barrier and transport epithelial cells	Kidney and urinary tract	Mesoderm	NPHS1, NPHS2
Proximal tubule brush border cell	Metanephric nephron progenitor	Proximal tubule	Reabsorbs filtrate solutes and water	Barrier and transport epithelial cells	Kidney and urinary tract	Mesoderm	SLC34A1, LRP2
Proximal convoluted tubule cell	Metanephric nephron progenitor	Proximal convoluted tubule	Reabsorbs filtered water and solutes	Barrier and transport epithelial cells	Nephron	Mesoderm	SLC34A1
Loop of Henle thin segment cell	Metanephric nephron progenitor	Loop of Henle	Contributes to countercurrent concentration of urine	Barrier and transport epithelial cells	Kidney and urinary tract	Mesoderm	
Thick ascending limb cell	Metanephric nephron progenitor	Loop of Henle	Reabsorbs Na-K-2Cl; dilutes tubular fluid	Barrier and transport epithelial cells	Nephron	Mesoderm	SLC12A1
Kidney distal tubule cell	Metanephric nephron progenitor	Distal convoluted tubule	Reabsorbs NaCl and regulates electrolytes	Barrier and transport epithelial cells	Kidney and urinary tract	Mesoderm	
Connecting tubule cell	Metanephric nephron progenitor	Connecting tubule	Regulates distal sodium and calcium transport	Barrier and transport epithelial cells	Nephron	Mesoderm	TRPV5
Principal cell	Ureteric bud epithelial progenitor	Collecting duct system	Reabsorbs sodium and water; secretes potassium	Barrier and transport epithelial cells	Kidney collecting duct cell	Mesoderm	AQP2, AVPR2
Intercalated cell	Ureteric bud epithelial progenitor	Collecting duct system	Regulates acid–base balance	Barrier and transport epithelial cells	Kidney collecting duct cell	Mesoderm	ATP6V1B1, SLC4A1
Type A intercalated cell	Collecting-duct progenitor	Collecting duct system	Secretes protons; reabsorbs bicarbonate	Barrier and transport epithelial cells	Collecting duct	Mesoderm	ATP6V1B1, SLC4A1
Type B intercalated cell	Collecting-duct progenitor	Collecting duct system	Secretes bicarbonate	Barrier and transport epithelial cells	Collecting duct	Mesoderm	SLC26A4
Non-A/non-B intercalated cell	Collecting-duct progenitor	Collecting duct system	Participates in acid–base transport	Barrier and transport epithelial cells	Collecting duct	Mesoderm	SLC26A4
Inner medullary collecting-duct cell	Ureteric-bud epithelial progenitor	Inner medullary collecting duct system	Contributes to water and urea handling	Barrier and transport epithelial cells	Collecting duct	Mesoderm	AQP2, SLC14A2
Urothelial cell	Urogenital sinus or ureteric-bud epithelial progenitor	Urinary tract	Forms distensible urine-tight barrier	Barrier cells	Kidney and urinary tract	Endoderm (bladder) or mesoderm (upper urinary tract)	UPK1A, UPK3A
Male accessory-gland duct cell	Mesodermal mesenchymal or epithelial progenitor	Male accessory gland ducts	Lines and transports accessory gland secretions	Barrier cells	Ductal and vascular epithelium	Mesoderm	
Efferent ducts cell	Mesodermal mesenchymal or epithelial progenitor	Efferent ducts	Transports sperm and reabsorbs luminal fluid	Barrier cells	Ductal and vascular epithelium	Mesoderm	
Epididymal principal cell	Mesodermal mesenchymal or epithelial progenitor	Epididymis	Absorbs fluid and promotes sperm maturation	Barrier cells	Ductal and vascular epithelium	Mesoderm	
Epididymal basal cell	Mesodermal mesenchymal or epithelial progenitor	Epididymis	Epididymal epithelial progenitor/support	Barrier cells	Ductal and vascular epithelium	Mesoderm	
Endothelial cell	Mesodermal angioblast	Blood vessels and lymphatic vessels	Lines vessels and regulates exchange	Barrier cells	Ductal and vascular epithelium	Mesoderm	PECAM1, VWF
Lymphatic endothelial cell	Endothelial progenitor	Lymphatic vessels	Forms lymphatic vessel lining	Barrier and transport epithelial cells	Endothelium	Mesoderm	PROX1, LYVE1
Vascular endothelial cell	Angioblast	Blood vessels	Forms vascular barrier and regulates flow	Barrier and transport epithelial cells	Endothelium	Mesoderm	PECAM1, VWF
Endothelial progenitor cell	Mesodermal angioblast	Blood and vascular niches	Generates endothelial cells	Stem and progenitor cells	Endothelium	Mesoderm	KDR, CD34
Pericyte	Mesenchymal progenitor	Microvascular walls	Supports capillaries and regulates permeability	Extracellular matrix and stromal cells	Vascular mural cells	Mesoderm	PDGFRB, RGS5
Mesothelial cell	Lateral plate mesoderm	Pleura, peritoneum, pericardium	Lines serosal cavities and secretes lubricant	Barrier and transport epithelial cells	Serosal epithelium	Mesoderm	WT1, CALB2
Planum semilunar epithelial cell of vestibular system of ear	Mesodermal mesenchymal or epithelial progenitor	Vestibular system	Secretes extracellular matrix	Extracellular matrix cells	Connective tissue and extracellular matrix	Ectoderm (otic placode)	
Organ of Corti interdental epithelial cell	Mesodermal mesenchymal or epithelial progenitor	Spiral limbus	Secretes components of the tectorial membrane	Extracellular matrix cells	Connective tissue and extracellular matrix	Ectoderm (otic placode)	
Loose connective tissue fibroblasts	Mesodermal mesenchymal or epithelial progenitor	Connective tissue	Synthesizes connective tissue matrix	Extracellular matrix cells	Connective tissue and extracellular matrix	Mesoderm	COL1A1
Corneal fibroblasts	Mesodermal mesenchymal or epithelial progenitor	Corneal stroma	Maintains corneal stromal matrix	Extracellular matrix cells	Connective tissue and extracellular matrix	Ectoderm (neural crest lineage)	KERA
Tendon fibroblasts	Mesodermal mesenchymal or epithelial progenitor	Tendon	Maintains tendon collagen	Extracellular matrix cells	Connective tissue and extracellular matrix	Mesoderm	SCX, TNMD
Bone marrow reticular tissue fibroblasts	Mesodermal mesenchymal or epithelial progenitor	Bone marrow stroma	Supports hematopoietic niches	Extracellular matrix cells	Connective tissue and extracellular matrix	Mesoderm	
Other nonepithelial fibroblasts	Mesodermal mesenchymal or epithelial progenitor	Connective tissue	Synthesizes tissue extracellular matrix	Extracellular matrix cells	Connective tissue and extracellular matrix	Mesoderm	
Myofibroblast	Fibroblast or pericyte	Wound stroma and organ interstitium	Contracts wounds and deposits matrix	Extracellular matrix and stromal cells	Fibroblasts	Mesoderm	ACTA2, COL1A1
Fibrocyte	Fibroblast precursor / mesenchymal progenitor	Connective tissue	Maintains stromal matrix	Extracellular matrix and stromal cells	Fibroblasts	Mesoderm	COL1A1
Mesenchymal stem cell	Mesodermal progenitor	Bone marrow and mesenchymal tissues	Produces stromal and skeletal lineages	Stem and progenitor cells	Mesenchyme	Mesoderm	THY1, ENG
Telocyte	Mesenchymal stromal progenitor	Organ interstitium	Forms long stromal contacts	Extracellular matrix and stromal cells	Interstitial cells	Mesoderm	CD34, PDGFRA
Hepatic stellate cell (Ito cell)	Mesodermal mesenchymal or epithelial progenitor	Liver	Stores vitamin A and remodels liver matrix	Extracellular matrix cells	Pericyte	Mesoderm	LRAT
Nucleus pulposus cell	Mesodermal mesenchymal or epithelial progenitor	Intervertebral disc	Maintains gelatinous disc matrix	Extracellular matrix cells	Connective tissue and extracellular matrix	Mesoderm	
Hyaline cartilage chondrocyte	Mesodermal mesenchymal or epithelial progenitor	Hyaline cartilage	Maintains hyaline cartilage matrix	Extracellular matrix cells	Connective tissue and extracellular matrix	Mesoderm	COL2A1, ACAN
Fibrocartilage chondrocyte	Mesodermal mesenchymal or epithelial progenitor	Fibrocartilage	Maintains fibrocartilage matrix	Extracellular matrix cells	Connective tissue and extracellular matrix	Mesoderm	
Elastic cartilage chondrocyte	Mesodermal mesenchymal or epithelial progenitor	Elastic cartilage	Maintains elastic cartilage matrix	Extracellular matrix cells	Connective tissue and extracellular matrix	Mesoderm	
Osteoblast	Mesodermal mesenchymal or epithelial progenitor	Bone	Deposits osteoid	Extracellular matrix cells	Connective tissue and extracellular matrix	Mesoderm	RUNX2, BGLAP
Chondroblast	Osteochondroprogenitor cell	Developing cartilage	Synthesizes cartilage matrix	Extracellular matrix and stromal cells	Cartilage cells	Mesoderm	SOX9, COL2A1
Osteocyte	Osteoblast	Bone matrix	Mechanosenses and maintains bone	Extracellular matrix and stromal cells	Bone cells	Mesoderm	SOST, DMP1
Osteoprogenitor cell	Mesodermal mesenchymal or epithelial progenitor	Bone	Precursor for osteoblasts	Extracellular matrix cells	Connective tissue and extracellular matrix	Mesoderm	
Hyalocyte	Myeloid progenitor	Vitreous body	Maintains vitreous matrix	Extracellular matrix cells	Connective tissue and extracellular matrix	Mesoderm (monocyte lineage)	
Stellate cell (organ dependent)	Mesodermal mesenchymal or epithelial progenitor	Organ dependent	Stellate morphology; function depends on organ	Extracellular matrix cells	Connective tissue and extracellular matrix	Varies by organ	
Pancreatic stellate cell	Mesodermal mesenchymal or epithelial progenitor	Pancreas stroma	Secretes pancreatic extracellular matrix	Extracellular matrix cells	Connective tissue and extracellular matrix	Mesoderm	ACTA2
Interstitial cell of Cajal	Mesenchymal progenitor	Gastrointestinal tract muscularis	Coordinates smooth muscle slow waves	Contractile and pacemaker cells	Gut pacemaker cells	Mesoderm	KIT, ANO1
Red skeletal muscle cell (slow twitch)	Mesodermal mesenchymal or epithelial progenitor	Skeletal muscle	Sustained oxidative contraction	Contractile cells	Skeletal muscle cells	Mesoderm	
White skeletal muscle cell (fast twitch)	Mesodermal mesenchymal or epithelial progenitor	Skeletal muscle	Fast glycolytic contraction	Contractile cells	Skeletal muscle cells	Mesoderm	
Intermediate skeletal muscle cell	Mesodermal mesenchymal or epithelial progenitor	Skeletal muscle	Intermediate muscle fiber contraction	Contractile cells	Skeletal muscle cells	Mesoderm	
Nuclear bag cell	Mesodermal mesenchymal or epithelial progenitor	Muscle spindle	Senses muscle stretch dynamics	Contractile cells	Skeletal muscle cells	Mesoderm	
Nuclear chain cell	Mesodermal mesenchymal or epithelial progenitor	Muscle spindle	Senses muscle length	Contractile cells	Skeletal muscle cells	Mesoderm	
Myosatellite cell (stem cell)	Myogenic progenitor	Skeletal muscle	Repairs and regenerates muscle	Stem and progenitor cells	Skeletal muscle satellite cells	Mesoderm	PAX7
Myoblast	Myogenic progenitor	Developing skeletal muscle	Fuses to form muscle fibers	Stem and progenitor cells	Skeletal muscle	Mesoderm	MYOD1
Cardiac muscle cell	Mesodermal mesenchymal or epithelial progenitor	Myocardium	Contracts to pump blood	Contractile cells	Cardiac muscle cells	Mesoderm	TNNT2
SA node cell	Mesodermal mesenchymal or epithelial progenitor	Sinoatrial node	Initiates cardiac rhythm	Contractile cells	Cardiac muscle cells	Mesoderm	HCN4
Purkinje fiber cell	Mesodermal mesenchymal or epithelial progenitor	Cardiac conduction system	Conducts cardiac impulses	Contractile cells	Cardiac muscle cells	Mesoderm	GJA5
Atrioventricular node cell	Cardiac mesodermal progenitor	Atrioventricular node	Delays conduction between atria and ventricles	Contractile cells	Cardiac conduction cells	Mesoderm	HCN4
Atrial cardiomyocyte	Cardiac mesodermal progenitor	Heart atria	Atrial contraction and natriuretic peptide secretion	Contractile cells	Cardiac muscle cells	Mesoderm	NPPA, TNNT2
Ventricular cardiomyocyte	Cardiac mesodermal progenitor	Heart ventricles	Powers ventricular ejection	Contractile cells	Cardiac muscle cells	Mesoderm	MYL2, TNNT2
Smooth muscle cell (various types)	Mesodermal mesenchymal or epithelial progenitor	Blood vessels and visceral organs	Contracts to control vessel or organ caliber	Contractile cells	Muscle and myoepithelium	Mesoderm	ACTA2, MYH11
Myoepithelial cell	Mesodermal mesenchymal or epithelial progenitor	Exocrine glands	Contracts around glandular units to expel secretions	Contractile cells	Muscle and myoepithelium	Ectoderm, endoderm, or mesoderm (by gland)	ACTA2, KRT17
Red blood cell (Erythrocyte)	erythroblasts	Blood	Transports oxygen and carbon dioxide	Blood and immune cells	Hematopoietic and immune lineages	Mesoderm (hematopoietic lineage)	HBB, GYPA
Erythroblast	Hematopoietic progenitor	Bone marrow	Matures into red blood cell	Blood and immune cells	Erythroid lineage	Mesoderm	GYPA, CD71
Reticulocyte	Erythroblast	Blood	Immature oxygen-carrying red blood cell	Blood and immune cells	Erythroid lineage	Mesoderm	GYPA
Megakaryocyte	Hematopoietic stem cell / progenitor	Bone marrow	Produces platelets	Blood and immune cells	Hematopoietic and immune lineages	Mesoderm (hematopoietic lineage)	ITGA2B, PF4
Megakaryoblast	Megakaryocyte progenitor	Bone marrow	Precursor of platelet-producing megakaryocyte	Blood and immune cells	Megakaryocytic lineage	Mesoderm	ITGA2B
Platelet (anucleate cell fragment)	Megakaryocyte	Blood	Hemostatic plug formation (anucleate fragment)	Blood and immune cells	Hematopoietic and immune lineages	Mesoderm (hematopoietic lineage)	ITGA2B, CD42b
Monocyte (white blood cell)	Hematopoietic stem cell / progenitor	Blood	Circulating phagocyte precursor	Blood and immune cells	Hematopoietic and immune lineages	Mesoderm (hematopoietic lineage)	CD14, LST1
Connective tissue macrophage (various types)	Hematopoietic stem cell / progenitor	Tissue resident	Phagocytosis and tissue surveillance	Blood and immune cells	Hematopoietic and immune lineages	Mesoderm (hematopoietic lineage)	CD68, CD163
Epidermal Langerhans cell	Hematopoietic stem cell / progenitor	Epidermis	Antigen presentation in skin	Blood and immune cells	Hematopoietic and immune lineages	Mesoderm (hematopoietic lineage)	CD1A, CD207
Osteoclast	Hematopoietic stem cell / progenitor	Bone	Resorbs bone	Blood and immune cells	Hematopoietic and immune lineages	Mesoderm (hematopoietic lineage)	CTSK, ACP5
Dendritic cell	Hematopoietic stem cell / progenitor	Lymphoid and peripheral tissues	Captures antigen and primes T cells	Blood and immune cells	Hematopoietic and immune lineages	Mesoderm (hematopoietic lineage)	HLA-DRA, CD11c
Plasmacytoid dendritic cell	Hematopoietic progenitor	Blood and lymphoid tissues	Secretes type I interferons	Blood and immune cells	Dendritic cells	Mesoderm	IL3RA, CLEC4C
Conventional dendritic cell	Dendritic-cell progenitor	Blood and tissues	Antigen presentation to T cells	Blood and immune cells	Dendritic cells	Mesoderm	ITGAX, HLA-DRA
Follicular dendritic cell	Stromal progenitor	Lymphoid follicles	Presents retained antigen to B cells	Blood and immune cells	Nonhematopoietic lymphoid stromal cells	Mesoderm	CR2, CXCL13
Kupffer cell	Yolk-sac or monocyte progenitor	Liver sinusoids	Liver-resident macrophage and phagocyte	Blood and immune cells	Tissue macrophage	Mesoderm	CD68, CLEC4F
Hofbauer cell	Fetal monocyte/macrophage progenitor	Placenta villous stroma	Placental macrophage	Blood and immune cells	Tissue macrophage	Mesoderm	CD163
Alveolar macrophage	Resident macrophage progenitor	Lung alveoli	Clears particles and surfactant	Blood and immune cells	Tissue macrophage	Mesoderm	MARCO
Histiocyte	Monocyte / tissue macrophage progenitor	Connective tissue	Tissue phagocytosis	Blood and immune cells	Tissue macrophage	Mesoderm	CD68
Microglial cell	Yolk-sac erythromyeloid progenitor	Central nervous system	CNS immune surveillance and phagocytosis	Blood and immune cells	Hematopoietic and immune lineages	Mesoderm (yolk-sac lineage)	P2RY12, TMEM119
Neutrophil granulocyte	myeloblast, promyelocyte, myelocyte, metamyelocyte	Blood	Phagocytosis and bacterial killing	Blood and immune cells	Hematopoietic and immune lineages	Mesoderm (hematopoietic lineage)	MPO, ELANE
Eosinophil granulocyte	myeloblast, promyelocyte, myelocyte, metamyelocyte	Blood	Defense against helminths; allergic inflammation	Blood and immune cells	Hematopoietic and immune lineages	Mesoderm (hematopoietic lineage)	EPX, PRG2
Band cell	Metamyelocyte	Blood	Immature neutrophil in circulation	Blood and immune cells	Granulocytes	Mesoderm	MPO
Myeloblast	Myeloid progenitor	Bone marrow	Granulocytic precursor	Blood and immune cells	Immature myeloid cells	Mesoderm	CD34, CD117
Promyelocyte	Myeloblast	Bone marrow	Granulocytic precursor with primary granules	Blood and immune cells	Immature myeloid cells	Mesoderm	MPO
Myelocyte	Promyelocyte	Bone marrow	Granulocytic precursor with specific granules	Blood and immune cells	Immature myeloid cells	Mesoderm	
Metamyelocyte	Myelocyte	Bone marrow	Late granulocytic precursor	Blood and immune cells	Immature myeloid cells	Mesoderm	
Basophil granulocyte	myeloblast, promyelocyte, myelocyte, metamyelocyte	Blood	Inflammatory mediator release	Blood and immune cells	Hematopoietic and immune lineages	Mesoderm (hematopoietic lineage)	FCER1A
Mast cell	Hematopoietic stem cell / progenitor	Tissue resident	Tissue allergic and antiparasitic responses	Blood and immune cells	Hematopoietic and immune lineages	Mesoderm (hematopoietic lineage)	KIT, TPSAB1
Helper T cell	Hematopoietic stem cell / progenitor	Blood and lymphoid tissues	Coordinates immune responses	Blood and immune cells	Hematopoietic and immune lineages	Mesoderm (hematopoietic lineage)	CD3, CD4
Regulatory T cell	Hematopoietic stem cell / progenitor	Blood and lymphoid tissues	Suppresses excessive immune responses	Blood and immune cells	Hematopoietic and immune lineages	Mesoderm (hematopoietic lineage)	FOXP3, CD25
Cytotoxic T cell	Hematopoietic stem cell / progenitor	Blood and lymphoid tissues	Kills infected or malignant cells	Blood and immune cells	Hematopoietic and immune lineages	Mesoderm (hematopoietic lineage)	CD3, CD8
Natural killer T cell	Hematopoietic stem cell / progenitor	Blood and lymphoid tissues	Recognizes lipid antigen and responds rapidly	Blood and immune cells	Hematopoietic and immune lineages	Mesoderm (hematopoietic lineage)	CD3, CD56
Gamma delta T cell	Thymic T-cell progenitor	Epithelia and lymphoid tissues	Rapid immune response to tissue stress	Blood and immune cells	T lymphocytes	Mesoderm	CD3, TRDC
Memory T cell	Activated naive T cell	Blood and lymphoid tissues	Long-lived antigen-specific memory	Blood and immune cells	T lymphocytes	Mesoderm	CD45RO
Naive T cell	Thymocyte	Blood and lymphoid tissues	Unprimed antigen-specific T cell	Blood and immune cells	T lymphocytes	Mesoderm	CCR7, CD45RA
T follicular helper cell	Activated CD4 T cell	Lymphoid follicles	Helps germinal-center B cells	Blood and immune cells	T lymphocytes	Mesoderm	CXCR5, BCL6
Th1 cell	Naive CD4 T cell	Lymphoid and inflamed tissues	IFN-γ-mediated cellular immunity	Blood and immune cells	T helper cells	Mesoderm	TBX21
Th2 cell	Naive CD4 T cell	Lymphoid and inflamed tissues	Type 2 immunity against helminths	Blood and immune cells	T helper cells	Mesoderm	GATA3
Th17 cell	Naive CD4 T cell	Lymphoid and barrier tissues	IL-17-mediated mucosal defense	Blood and immune cells	T helper cells	Mesoderm	RORC
B cell(/lymphocyte)	Hematopoietic stem cell / progenitor	Blood and lymphoid tissues	Adaptive humoral immune response	Blood and immune cells	Hematopoietic and immune lineages	Mesoderm (hematopoietic lineage)	CD19, CD20
Memory B cell	Activated B cell	Blood and lymphoid tissues	Rapid secondary antibody response	Blood and immune cells	B lymphocytes	Mesoderm	CD27
Naive B cell	Immature B cell	Blood and lymphoid tissues	Unprimed antigen-specific B cell	Blood and immune cells	B lymphocytes	Mesoderm	CD19, IGHD
Germinal center B cell	Activated B cell	Lymphoid follicles	Affinity maturation and class switching	Blood and immune cells	B lymphocytes	Mesoderm	BCL6
Plasma cell	Hematopoietic stem cell / progenitor	Bone marrow and lymphoid tissues	Secretes antibodies	Blood and immune cells	Hematopoietic and immune lineages	Mesoderm (hematopoietic lineage)	CD138, MZB1
Plasmablast	Activated B cell	Blood and lymphoid tissues	Proliferating antibody-secreting precursor	Blood and immune cells	B lymphocytes	Mesoderm	CD27, CD38
Natural killer cell	Hematopoietic stem cell / progenitor	Blood and lymphoid tissues	Kills infected or malignant cells	Blood and immune cells	Hematopoietic and immune lineages	Mesoderm (hematopoietic lineage)	CD56, NCAM1
Innate lymphoid cell	Common lymphoid progenitor	Mucosal and other tissues	Rapid cytokine-mediated innate defense	Blood and immune cells	Innate lymphoid cells	Mesoderm	IL7R
Group 1 innate lymphoid cell	Innate lymphoid progenitor	Peripheral tissues	Type 1 innate cytokine responses	Blood and immune cells	Innate lymphoid cells	Mesoderm	TBX21
Group 2 innate lymphoid cell	Innate lymphoid progenitor	Barrier tissues	Type 2 cytokine responses	Blood and immune cells	Innate lymphoid cells	Mesoderm	GATA3, IL1RL1
Group 3 innate lymphoid cell	Innate lymphoid progenitor	Intestinal mucosa	IL-17 and IL-22 mucosal defense	Blood and immune cells	Innate lymphoid cells	Mesoderm	RORC
Hematopoietic stem cells and committed progenitors for the blood and immune system (various types)	Hematopoietic stem cell / progenitor	Bone marrow	Self-renews and produces blood cell lineages	Blood and immune cells	Hematopoietic and immune lineages	Mesoderm (hematopoietic lineage)	CD34, CD38−
Common lymphoid progenitor	Hematopoietic stem cell	Bone marrow	Produces lymphocyte lineages	Stem and progenitor cells	Hematopoietic progenitors	Mesoderm	CD34
Common myeloid progenitor	Hematopoietic stem cell	Bone marrow	Produces myeloid lineages	Stem and progenitor cells	Hematopoietic progenitors	Mesoderm	CD34
CFU-GEMM	Myeloid progenitor	Bone marrow	Multipotent granulocyte, erythrocyte, monocyte, megakaryocyte progenitor	Stem and progenitor cells	Hematopoietic progenitors	Mesoderm	
Oogonium	Primordial germ cell	Ovary	Mitotic female germ-cell precursor	Germ cells	Germ-cell lineage	Primordial germ-cell lineage (epiblast)	
Oocyte	Oogonium	Ovary	Meiotic female germ cell	Germ cells	Female germ cells	Primordial germ-cell lineage (epiblast)	
Ovum (mature oocyte)	Oocyte	Ovary / fallopian tube	Female gamete	Germ cells	Female germ cells	Primordial germ-cell lineage (epiblast)	
Spermatid	Spermatocyte	Testis	Haploid differentiating male germ cell	Germ cells	Germ-cell lineage	Primordial germ-cell lineage (epiblast)	
Spermatocyte	Spermatogonium	Testis	Meiotic male germ cell	Germ cells	Germ-cell lineage	Primordial germ-cell lineage (epiblast)	
Spermatogonium	Primordial germ cell	Testis	Mitotic male germ cell precursor	Germ cells	Germ-cell lineage	Primordial germ-cell lineage (epiblast)	
Spermatozoon	Spermatid	Male reproductive tract	Fertilizes ovum	Germ cells	Germ-cell lineage	Primordial germ-cell lineage (epiblast)	
Granulosa cell	Mesodermal progenitor	Ovarian follicle	Supports oocyte and synthesizes estrogen	Supporting cells	Reproductive, thymic, or renal support cells	Mesoderm	FOXL2
Sertoli cell	Mesodermal progenitor	Testis	Supports spermatogenesis and blood–testis barrier	Supporting cells	Reproductive, thymic, or renal support cells	Mesoderm	SOX9
Spermatogonial stem cell	Primordial germ cell lineage	Seminiferous tubule	Self-renews male germ line	Stem and progenitor cells	Male germ cells	Primordial germ-cell lineage (epiblast)	GFRA1, UTF1
Epithelial reticular cell	Pharyngeal pouch endodermal progenitor	Thymus	Supports thymocyte selection	Supporting cells	Reproductive, thymic, or renal support cells	Endoderm (thymic epithelium)	KRT5, KRT8
Peg cell	Müllerian duct epithelial progenitor	Fallopian tube	Secretory support of tubal lumen	Exocrine secretory epithelial cells	Tubal epithelial cells	Mesoderm	PAX8, OVGP1
Ciliated tubal epithelial cell	Müllerian duct epithelial progenitor	Fallopian tube	Moves gametes and embryo via cilia	Barrier and transport epithelial cells	Tubal epithelial cells	Mesoderm	FOXJ1
Renal interstitial cell	Mesodermal progenitor	Kidney interstitium	Structural and endocrine support of renal parenchyma	Interstitial cells	Reproductive, thymic, or renal support cells	Mesoderm	
Interstitial cell (renal)	Renal stromal progenitor	Kidney interstitium	Structural support, paracrine signaling	Extracellular matrix and stromal cells	Renal interstitial cells	Mesoderm	
Cytotrophoblast	Trophectoderm	Placenta chorionic villi	Progenitor for syncytial and extravillous trophoblast	Placental cells	Trophoblast	Trophectoderm (extraembryonic; outside the three germ layers)	KRT7, TP63
Syncytiotrophoblast	Fusion of cytotrophoblasts	Placenta villous surface	Maternal–fetal exchange and hormone secretion	Placental cells	Trophoblast	Trophectoderm (extraembryonic; outside the three germ layers)	CGB, SDC1
Extravillous trophoblast	Cytotrophoblast	Placenta implantation site	Invades decidua and remodels uterine vessels	Placental cells	Trophoblast	Trophectoderm (extraembryonic; outside the three germ layers)	HLA-G

== Cell type databases ==
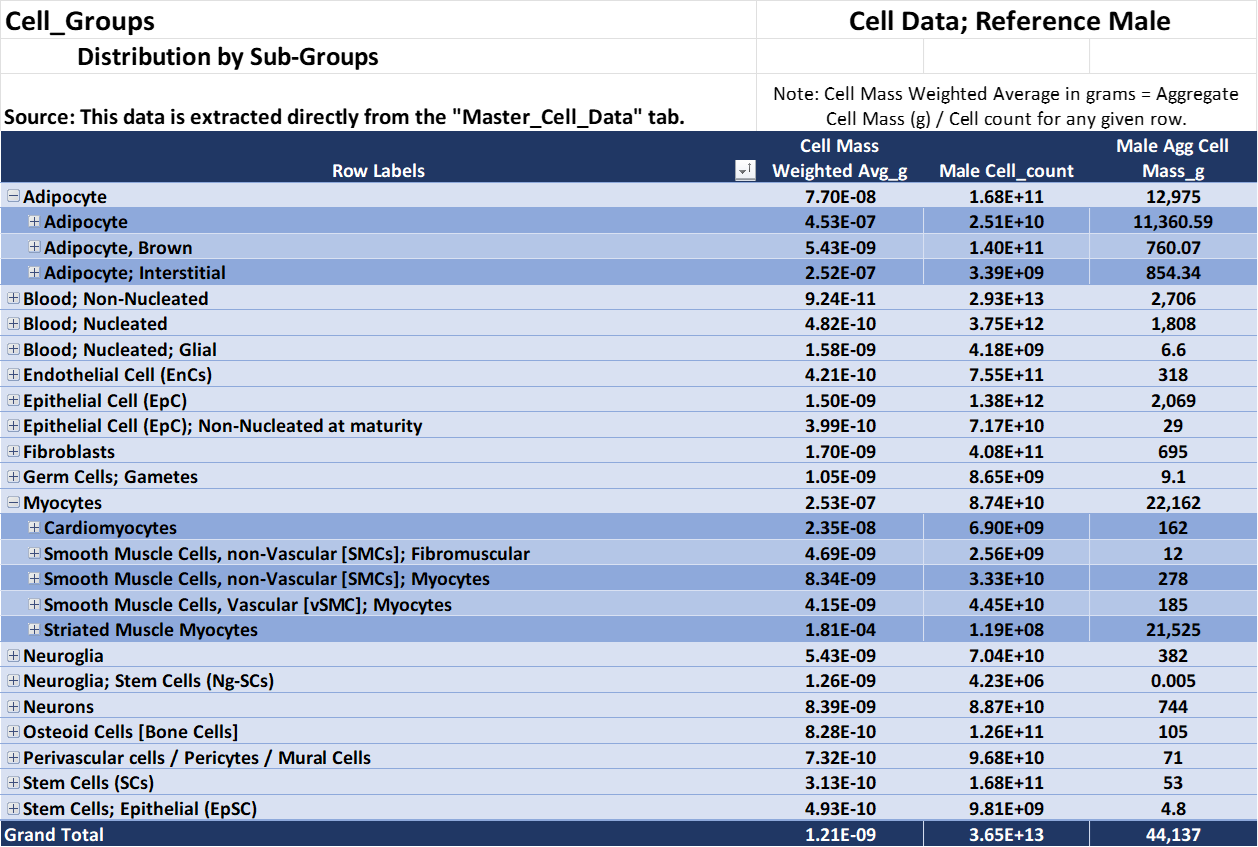
The above dataset provides a nested list of cell groups with over 400 human cell types with cell count, cell size, and aggregate cell mass (biomass). See Dataset S1, Cell Group by Subgroup Tab, in this reference.

Name	Provider	Sources of revenue/sponsors	Scope	Amount of cells identified so far
HubMap	A series of US based universities	Unknown		~1200
Human Cell Atlas	Columbia University Medical Center at Columbia University	Chan Zuckerberg Initiative	37 trillion cells	
CellXgene		Chan Zuckerberg Initiative		

=== Cells derived primarily from endoderm ===
The endodermal cells primarily generate the lining and glands of the gastrointestinal tract.

=== Cells derived primarily from ectoderm ===
==== Nervous system ====
There are nerve cells, also known as neurons, present in the human body. They are branched out. These cells make up nervous tissue. A neuron consists of a cell body with a nucleus and cytoplasm, and cytoplasmic protrusions of an axon, and dendrites.

== See also ==
- List of human cell types derived from the germ layers
- Human Cell Atlas
- Cell Ontology
- List of organs of the human body
- List of human microbiota
