= Trichocyte =

Trichocyte can refer to:

- Trichocyte (human)
- Trichocyte (algae)
