= Gill =

Respiratory organ in aquatic animals

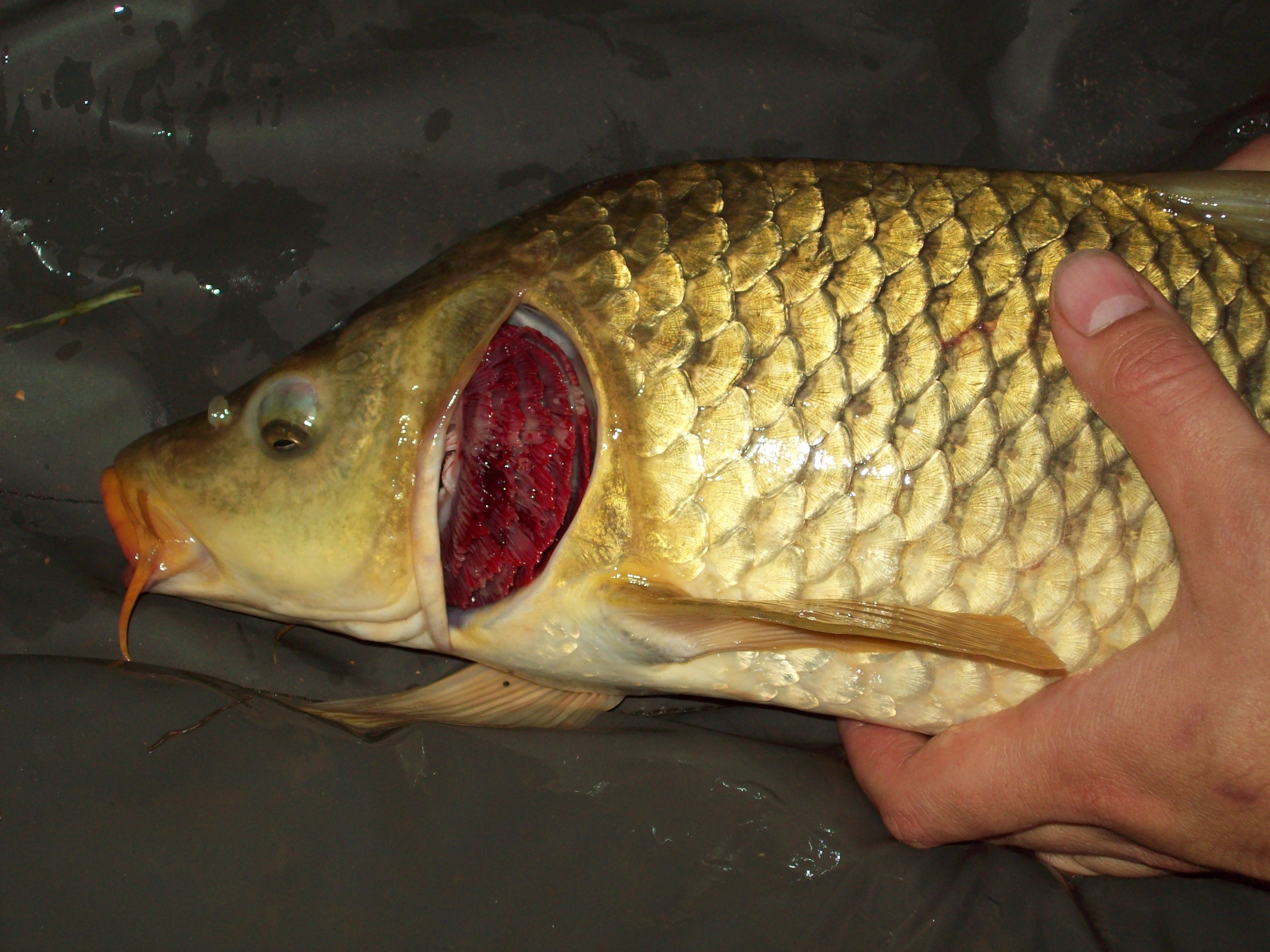
The red gills of this common carp are visibly exposed as a result of a gill flap birth defect.

A gill (/ɡɪl/) is a specialized respiratory organ that many aquatic animals use for aquatic gas exchange, i.e. to extract dissolved oxygen from water and to excrete carbon dioxide. Branchia (pl.: branchiae, from Ancient Greek βράγχια) is the zoologists' academic name for gills.

The gills of some semi-aquatic clades (e.g. crabs, terrestrial hermit crabs and amphibious fishes), have also adapted to allow air respiration (breathing) on land provided the gills are kept moist. In some terrestrial chelicerates species (tetrapulmonates such as spiders and scorpions), their ancestral gills have evolved into fully air-breathing book lungs. In some planktivorous bony fish species (e.g. silver and bighead carps), the gills are also used as a filter feeding organ via comb-like projections called gill rakers.

The microscopic structure of a gill presents a large surface area in contact with the external environment, which allows optimal diffusion. With the exception of some aquatic insects, the gills of aquatic animals have filaments and lamellae (folds) that contain blood vessels or coelomic fluid, from which gases are exchanged into and out of blood/hemolymph through the thin gill walls before being distributed by the circulatory system to other parts of the body. Gills or gill-like organs, located in different parts of the body, are found in various groups of aquatic animals, including molluscs, crustaceans, xiphosurans, aquatic insects, polychaetes and most aquatic vertebrates (fish and amphibian tadpoles). Semi-terrestrial marine animals such as crabs and mudskippers have gill chambers in which they store water, enabling them to temporarily survive on the reservoir of dissolved oxygen when they are on land.

== History ==
Galen observed that fish had multitudes of openings (foramina), big enough to admit gases, but too fine to give passage to water. Pliny the Elder held that fish respired by their gills, but observed that Aristotle was of another opinion. The word branchia comes from the Greek βράγχια, "gills", plural of βράγχιον (in singular, meaning a fin).

== Function ==
Many microscopic aquatic animals, and some larger but inactive ones, can absorb sufficient oxygen through the entire surface of their bodies, and so can respire adequately without gills. However, more complex or more active aquatic organisms usually require one gill or more. Many invertebrates, and even amphibians, use both the body surface and gills for gaseous exchange.

Gills usually consist of thin filaments of tissue, lamellae (plates), branches, or slender, tufted processes that have a highly folded surface to increase surface area. The delicate nature of the gills is possible because the surrounding water provides support. The blood or other body fluid must be in intimate contact with the respiratory surface for ease of diffusion.

A high surface area is crucial to the gas exchange of aquatic organisms, as water contains only a small fraction of dissolved oxygen compared to the oxygen content of air, and it diffuses more slowly. A cubic meter of air contains about 275 grams of oxygen at STP. Fresh water holds less than 1/25th the oxygen content of air, the dissolved oxygen content being approximately 8 cm^{3}/L compared to the oxygen content of air which is 210 cm^{3}/L. Water is 777 times more dense than air and is 100 times more viscous. Oxygen has a diffusion rate in air 10,000 times greater than in water. The use of sac-like lungs to remove oxygen from water would not be efficient enough to sustain life. Rather than using lungs, "[g]aseous exchange takes place across the surface of highly vascularised gills over which a one-way current of water is kept flowing by a specialised pumping mechanism. The density of the water prevents the gills from collapsing and lying on top of each other; [such collapse] happens when a fish is taken out of water."

Usually water is moved across the gills in one direction by the current, by the motion of the animal through the water, by the beating of cilia or other appendages, or by means of a pumping mechanism. In fish and some molluscs, the efficiency of the gills is greatly enhanced by a countercurrent exchange mechanism in which the water passes over the gills in the opposite direction to the flow of blood through them. This mechanism is very efficient and as much as 90% of the dissolved oxygen in the water may be recovered.

== Vertebrates ==
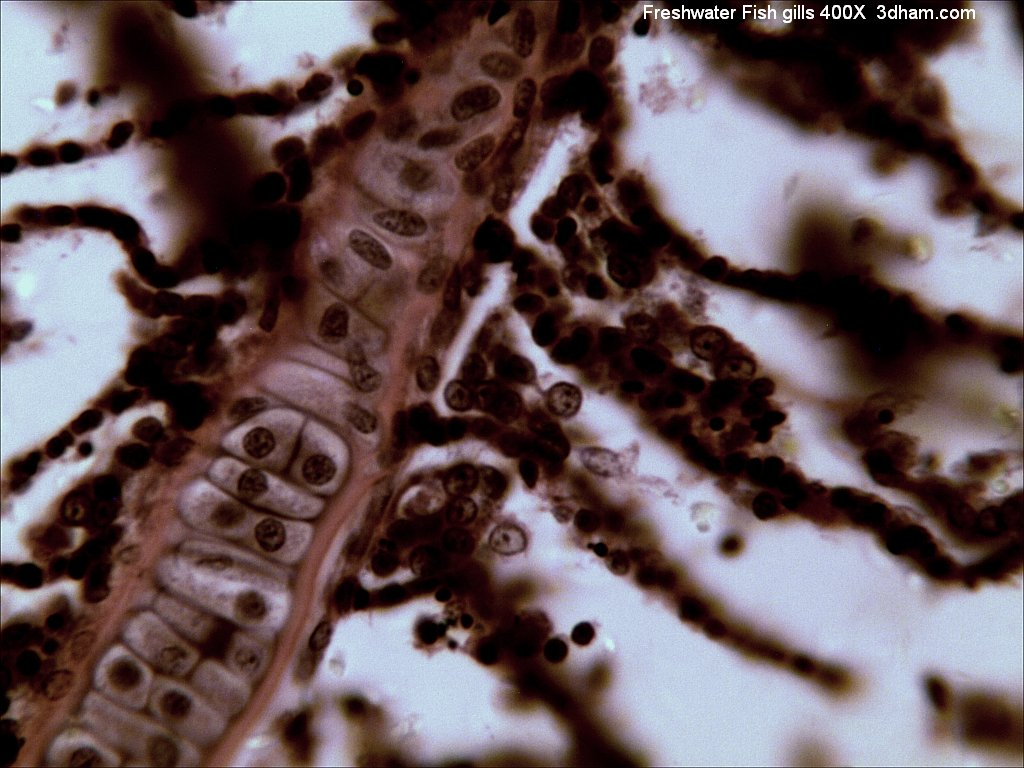
Freshwater fish gills magnified 400 times

The gills of vertebrates typically develop in the walls of the pharynx, along a series of gill slits opening to the exterior. Most species employ a countercurrent exchange system to enhance the diffusion of substances in and out of the gill, with blood and water flowing in opposite directions to each other. The gills are composed of comb-like filaments, the gill lamellae, which help increase their surface area for oxygen exchange.

When a fish breathes, it draws in a mouthful of water at regular intervals. Then it draws the sides of its throat together, forcing the water through the gill openings, so it passes over the gills to the outside. Fish gill slits may be the evolutionary ancestors of the thymus glands, parathyroid glands, as well as many other structures derived from the embryonic branchial pouches.

=== Fish ===
The gills of fish form a number of slits connecting the pharynx to the outside of the animal on either side of the fish behind the head. Originally there were many slits, but during evolution, the number reduced, and modern fish mostly have five pairs, and never more than eight.

==== Cartilaginous fish ====
Sharks and rays typically have five pairs of gill slits that open directly to the outside of the body, though some more primitive sharks have six pairs with the Broadnose sevengill shark being the only cartilaginous fish exceeding this number. Adjacent slits are separated by a cartilaginous gill arch from which projects a cartilaginous gill ray. This gill ray is the support for the sheet-like interbranchial septum, which the individual lamellae of the gills lie on either side of. The base of the arch may also support gill rakers, projections into the pharyngeal cavity that help to prevent large pieces of debris from damaging the delicate gills.

A smaller opening, the spiracle, lies in the back of the first gill slit. This bears a small pseudobranch that resembles a gill in structure, but only receives blood already oxygenated by the true gills. The spiracle is thought to be homologous to the ear opening in higher vertebrates.

Most sharks rely on ram ventilation, forcing water into the mouth and over the gills by rapidly swimming forward. In slow-moving or bottom-dwelling species, especially among skates and rays, the spiracle may be enlarged, and the fish breathes by sucking water through this opening, instead of through the mouth.

Chimaeras differ from other cartilagenous fish, having lost both the spiracle and the fifth gill slit. The remaining slits are covered by an operculum, developed from the septum of the gill arch in front of the first gill.

==== Bony fish ====
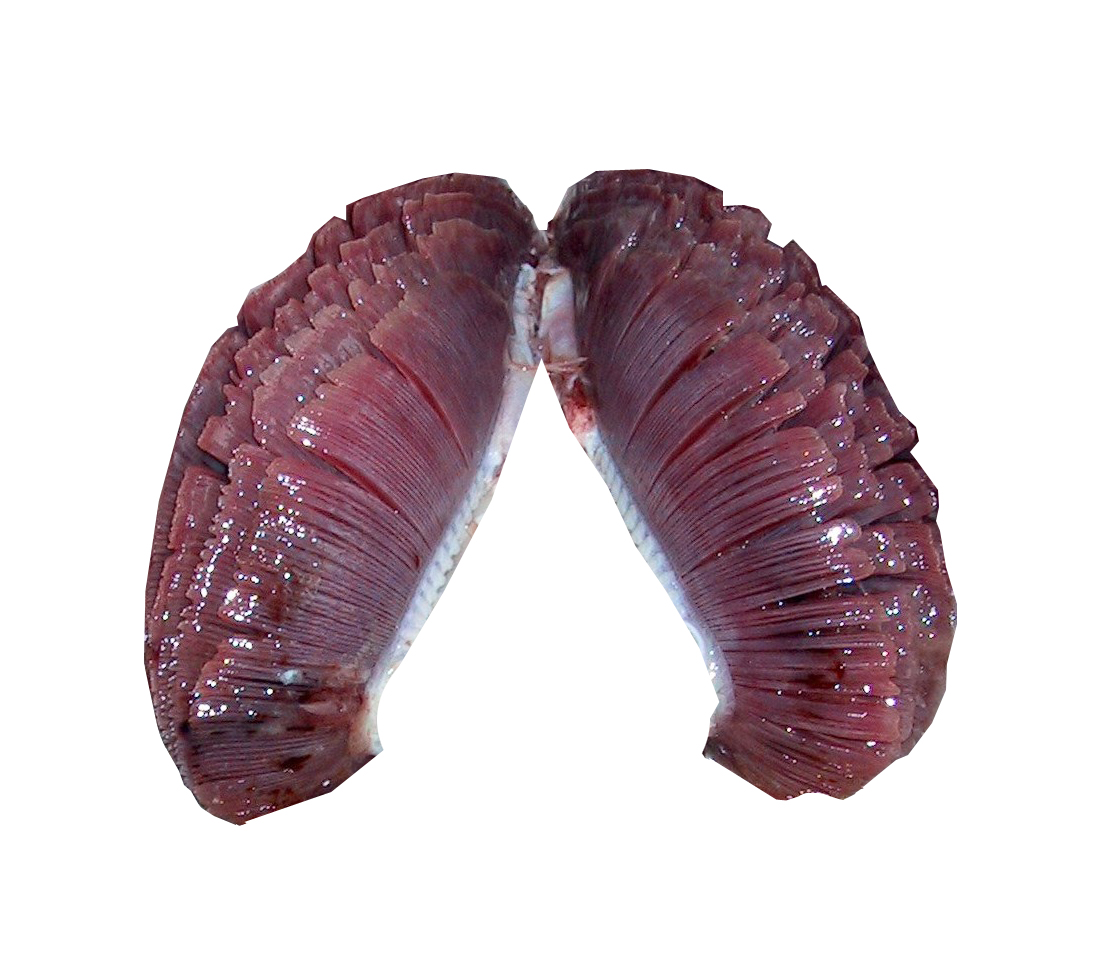
The red gills inside a detached tuna head (viewed from behind)

In bony fish, the gills lie in a branchial chamber covered by a bony operculum. The great majority of bony fish species have five pairs of gills, although a few have lost some over the course of evolution. The operculum can be important in adjusting the pressure of water inside of the pharynx to allow proper ventilation of the gills, so bony fish do not have to rely on ram ventilation (and hence near constant motion) to breathe. Valves inside the mouth keep the water from escaping.

The gill arches of bony fish typically have no septum, so the gills alone project from the arch, supported by individual gill rays. Some species retain gill rakers. Though all but the most primitive bony fish lack spiracles, the pseudobranch associated with them often remains, being located at the base of the operculum. This is, however, often greatly reduced, consisting of a small mass of cells without any remaining gill-like structure.

Marine teleosts also use their gills to excrete osmolytes (e.g. Na⁺, Cl^{−}). The gills' large surface area tends to create a problem for fish that seek to regulate the osmolarity of their internal fluids. Seawater contains more osmolytes than the fish's internal fluids, so marine fishes naturally lose water through their gills via osmosis. To regain the water, marine fishes drink large amounts of sea water while simultaneously expending energy to excrete salt through the Na^{+}/K^{+}-ATPase ionocytes (formerly known as mitochondrion-rich cells and chloride cells). Conversely, fresh water contains less osmolytes than the fish's internal fluids. Therefore, freshwater fishes must utilize their gill ionocytes to attain ions from their environment to maintain optimal blood osmolarity.

Lampreys and hagfish do not have gill slits as such. Instead, the gills are contained in spherical pouches, with a circular opening to the outside. Like the gill slits of higher fish, each pouch contains two gills. In some cases, the openings may be fused together, effectively forming an operculum. Lampreys have seven pairs of pouches, while hagfishes may have six to fourteen, depending on the species. In the hagfish, the pouches connect with the pharynx internally and a separate tube which has no respiratory tissue (the pharyngocutaneous duct) develops beneath the pharynx proper, expelling ingested debris by closing a valve at its anterior end. Lungfish larvae also have external gills, as does the primitive ray-finned fish Polypterus, though the latter has a structure different from amphibians.

=== Amphibians ===
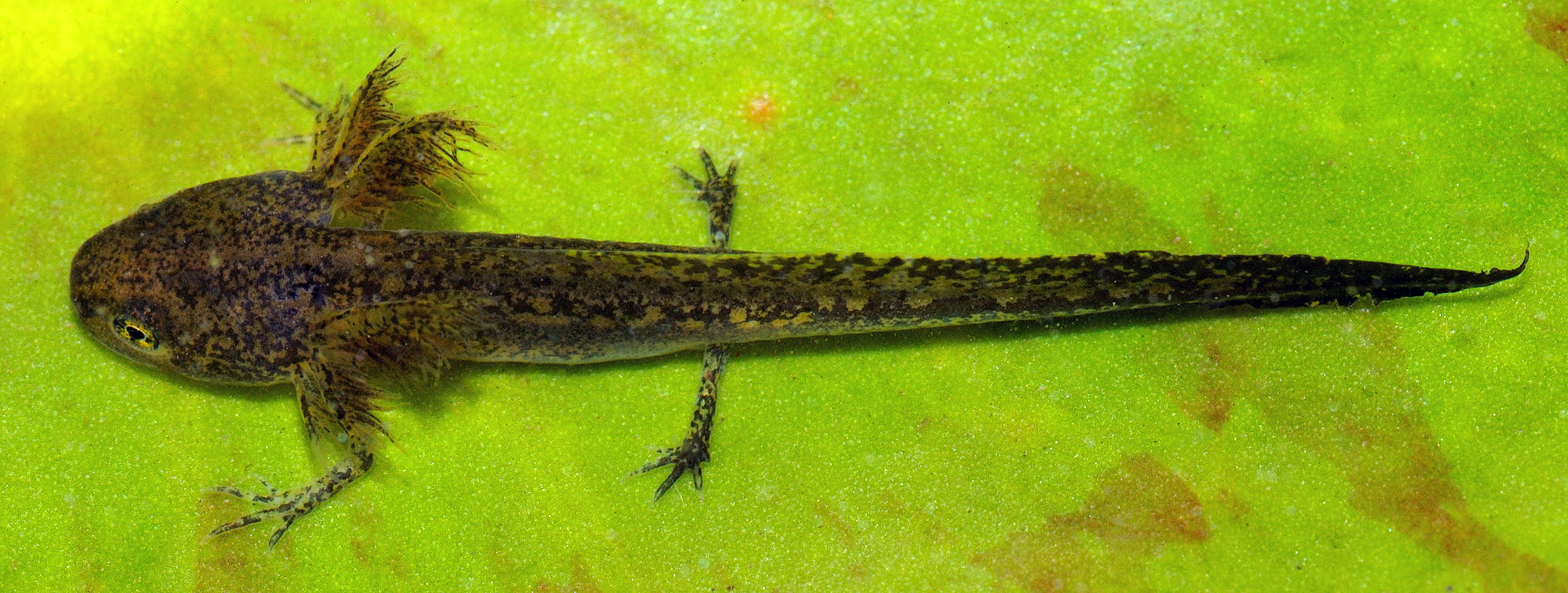
An alpine newt larva showing the external gills, which flare just behind the head

Tadpoles of amphibians have from three to five gill slits that do not contain actual gills. Usually no spiracle or true operculum is present, though many species have operculum-like structures. Instead of internal gills, they develop three feathery external gills that grow from the outer surface of the gill arches. Sometimes, adults retain these, but they usually disappear at metamorphosis. Examples of salamanders that retain their external gills upon reaching adulthood are the olm and the mudpuppy.

Still, some extinct tetrapod groups did retain true gills. A study on Archegosaurus demonstrates that it had internal gills like true fish.

== Invertebrates ==
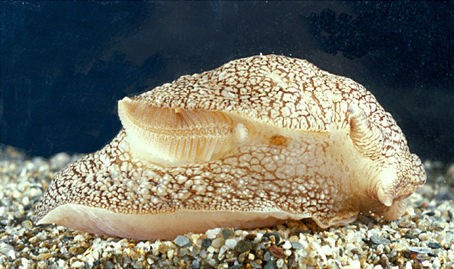
A sea slug, Pleurobranchaea meckelii: The gill (or ctenidium) is visible in this view of the right-hand side of the animal.

Crustaceans, molluscs, and some aquatic insects have tufted gills or plate-like structures on the surfaces of their bodies. Gills of various types and designs, simple or more elaborate, have evolved independently in the past, even among the same class of animals. The segments of polychaete worms bear parapodia many of which carry gills. Sponges lack specialised respiratory structures, and the whole of the animal acts as a gill as water is drawn through its spongy structure.

Aquatic arthropods usually have gills which are in most cases modified appendages. In some crustaceans these are exposed directly to the water, while in others, they are protected inside a gill chamber. Horseshoe crabs have book gills which are external flaps, each with many thin leaf-like membranes.

Many marine invertebrates such as bivalve molluscs are filter feeders. A current of water is maintained through the gills for gas exchange, and food particles are filtered out at the same time. These may be trapped in mucus and moved to the mouth by the beating of cilia.

Respiration in the echinoderms (such as starfish and sea urchins) is carried out using a very primitive version of gills called papulae. These thin protuberances on the surface of the body contain diverticula of the water vascular system.

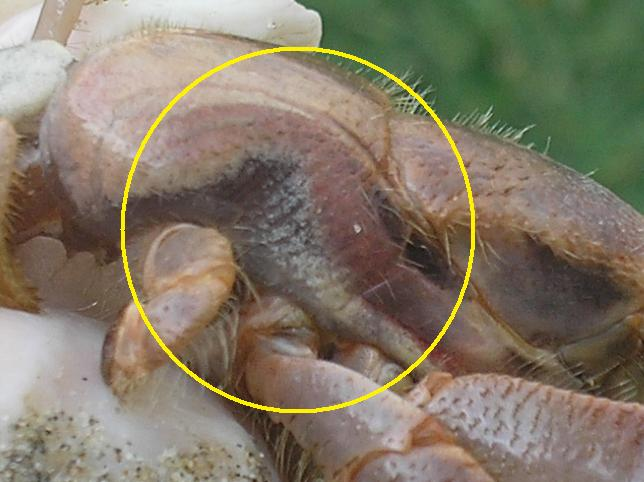
Caribbean hermit crabs have modified gills that allow them to live in humid conditions.

The gills of aquatic insects are tracheal, but the air tubes are sealed, commonly connected to thin external plates or tufted structures that allow diffusion. The oxygen in these tubes is renewed through the gills. In the larval dragonfly, the wall of the caudal end of the alimentary tract (rectum) is richly supplied with tracheae as a rectal gill, and water pumped into and out of the rectum provides oxygen to the closed tracheae.

=== Plastrons ===
A plastron is a type of structural adaptation occurring among some aquatic arthropods (primarily insects), a form of cover-plate or non-organ gill, which holds a thin film of atmospheric oxygen in the area near small openings called spiracles that connect to the tracheal system. The plastron typically consists of dense patches of hydrophobic setae on the body, which prevent water from entering the spiracles, but may also involve scales or microscopic ridges projecting from the cuticle. The physical properties of the interface between the trapped air film and surrounding water allow gas exchange through the spiracles, almost as if the insect were in atmospheric air. Carbon dioxide diffuses into the surrounding water due to its high solubility, while oxygen diffuses into the film as the concentration within the film has been reduced by respiration, and nitrogen also diffuses out as its tension has been increased; oxygen diffuses into the air film at a higher rate than nitrogen diffuses out. However, water surrounding the insect can become oxygen-depleted if there is no water movement, so many such insects in still water actively direct a flow of water over their bodies.

The non-organ gill mechanism allows aquatic arthropods with plastrons to remain constantly submerged. Examples include many beetles in the family Elmidae, aquatic weevils, and true bugs in the family Aphelocheiridae, as well as at least one species of ricinuleid arachnid and various mites. A somewhat similar mechanism is used by the diving bell spider, which maintains an underwater bubble that exchanges gas like a plastron. Other diving insects (such as backswimmers, and hydrophilid beetles) may carry trapped air bubbles, but deplete the oxygen more quickly, and thus need constant replenishment.

== See also ==
- Aquatic respiration – Process whereby an aquatic animal obtains oxygen from water
- Artificial gills (human) – Hypothetical devices to extract oxygen from water
- Book lung – Type of lung commonly found in arachnids
- Fish gill – Organ that allows fish to breathe underwater
- Gill raker – Bony or cartilaginous processes that project from the branchial arch
- Gill slit – Individual opening to a gill
- Lung – Primary organ of the respiratory system
