= Mammary alveolus =

Small cavity or sac found in the mammary gland

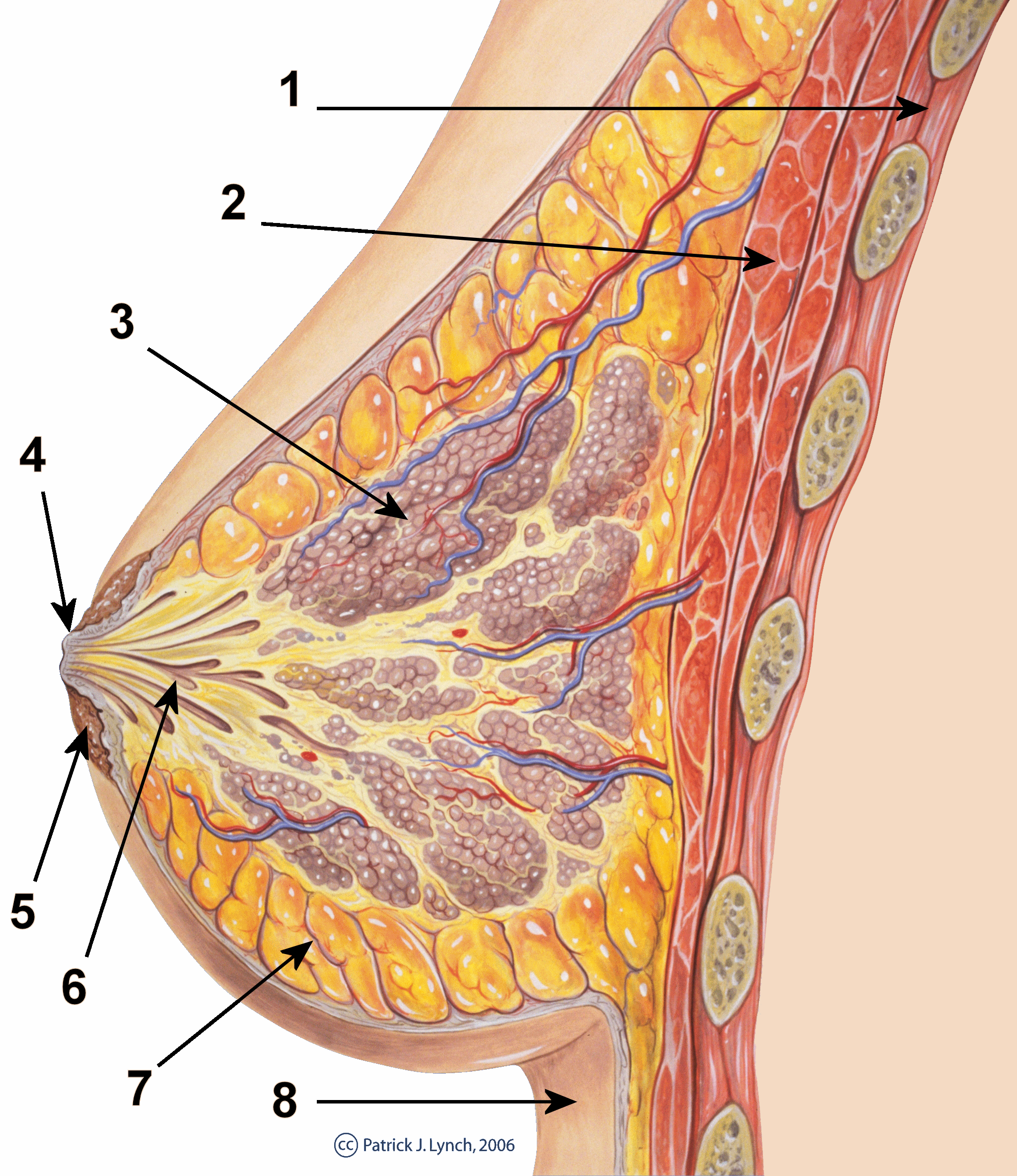
The breast: cross-section scheme of the mammary gland.: 1. Chest wall; 2. Pectoralis muscles; 3. Lobules; 4. Nipple; 5. Areola; 6. Milk duct; 7. Fatty tissue; 8. Skin

A mammary alveolus (pl.: alveoli, from Latin alveolus, "little cavity"), sometimes also called a mammary acinus, is a small cavity or sac found in the mammary gland. Mammary alveoli are the primary site of milk production and storage. In the lactating mammary gland, the cavity (lumen) is lined by milk-secreting cells (called lactocytes) surrounded by muscle-like cells (called myoepithelial cells). In response to oxytocin stimulation, the myoepithelial cells contract, pushing milk out of the alveolus and into the ducts.

Mammary alveoli cluster into groups called mammary lobules, and each breast may contain 15 to 20 of these lobules. The lobules drain milk through the lactiferous ducts out of the nipples.

== Structure ==
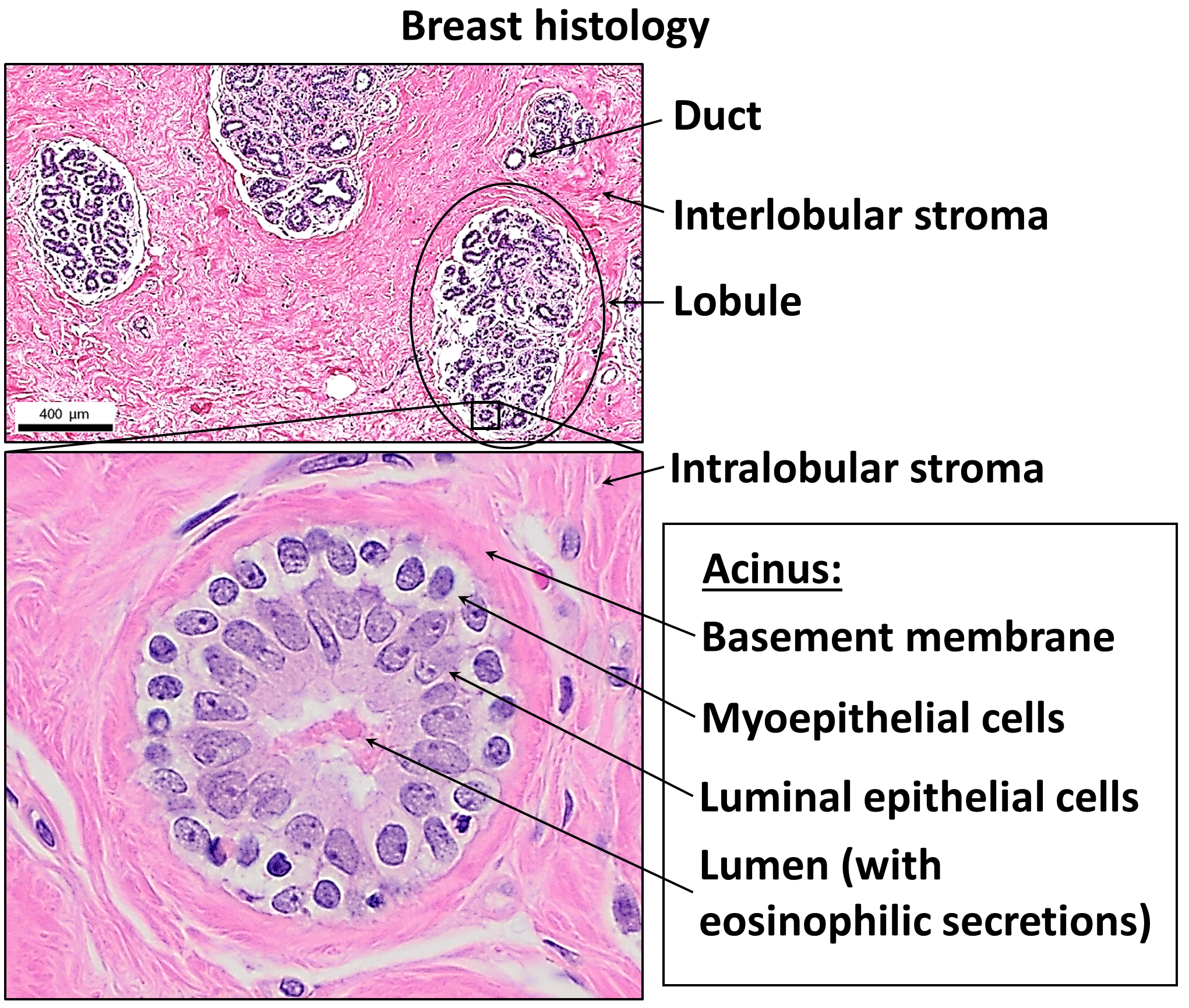
Normal histology of a breast

Luminal epithelial cells line the innermost layer of the alveoli and ducts. In the resting mammary gland (such as before pregnancy), these come in two main varieties: the luminal hormone sensing (LHS) cells, and the luminal adaptive secretory precursor (LASP) cells. Surrounding the luminal epithelial cells are a second layer of cells, called the basal-myoepithelial (B-myo) cells, which can contract like muscle cells. During pregnancy, the cells of the alveoli proliferate, and some of the LASP cells differentiate into lactocytes which produce milk.

=== Luminal adaptive secretory precursor cells ===
Luminal adaptive secretory precursor (LASP) cells are important progenitor cells found in the mammary glands. They have also been called luminal progenitor cells or alveolar cells, though the latter term is misleading since not all are located in the alveoli. Outside of their role in differentiating into lactocytes, their function is one of the least understood of the epithelial cells of the mammary gland. They do not express many of the hormone receptors found in LHS cells, and are thought to be the type of cell that are the origin of triple-negative breast cancer.

=== Lactocytes ===
During pregnancy, a subset of the LASP cells differentiate into lactocytes, which are the type of cell that is responsible for producing milk. Most of the milk production occurs in the alveoli, but some milk producing cells have been found in the ducts. Unlike their precursor LASP cells, they respond to hormones like prolactin and corticosteroids, which signal to them to maintain their ability to produce milk.

=== Basal-myoepithelial cells ===
Basal-myoepithelial (B-myo) cells, often just called basal cells or myoepithelial cells, are muscle-like cells that surround the luminal cells of the alveoli and ducts. During pregnancy, they differentiate into a mature form and start producing oxytocin receptors. During suckling, oxytocin is released from the pituitary gland, which stimulates these cells to contract and squeeze milk out of the alveoli into the ducts.

== Resting alveoli ==
Outside of pregnancy and lactation, there are relatively few lobules, and their attached mammary acini are rudimentary and relatively small.

== See also ==
- Breastfeeding
- Lactation
