= Thin segment of loop of Henle =

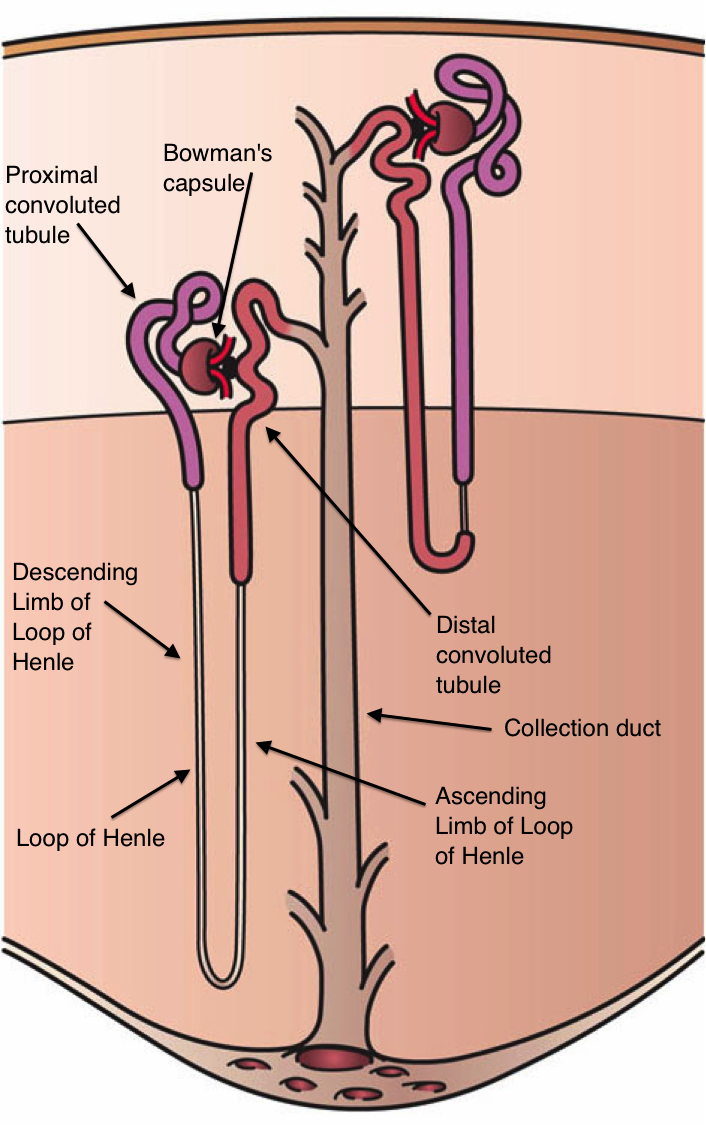
Image showing the parts of the nephron, with the Loop of Henle annotated

The thin segment is a part of the renal tubule found between the proximal and distal tubules. The renal tubule and the renal corpuscle together comprise the nephron.

The thin segment is described as a U-shaped band, consisting of the two continuous parts:

- descending limb of loop of Henle
- ascending limb of loop of Henle

== Histology ==
Both limbs of the loop of Henle are lined with the simple squamous epithelium. Their main function is to regulate the levels of water and solutes in the primary urine. The basement membrane of the thin limb in humans has very uniform nodular thickenings that form a network that surrounds the tubule and acts as a support structure that is homologous to the collenchyma in plants. Smith, RA et al. (Arch Pathol Lab Med Vol 108, May 1984) have designated these nodules "Belliveau Bodies" after Robert Belliveau the pathologist who originally described these structures.

== See also ==
- List of distinct cell types in the adult human body
- List of human cell types derived from the germ layers
