= Cell type =

Metaclass used to distinguish between cell forms

A cell type is a classification used to identify cells that share morphological or phenotypical features. A multicellular organism may contain cells of a number of widely differing and specialized cell types, such as muscle cells and skin cells, that differ both in appearance and function yet have identical genomic sequences. Cells may have the same genotype, but belong to different cell types due to the differential regulation of the genes they contain. Classification of a specific cell type is often done through the use of microscopy (such as those from the cluster of differentiation family that are commonly used for this purpose in immunology). Recent developments in single-cell RNA sequencing facilitated classification of cell types based on shared gene expression patterns. This has led to the discovery of many new cell types in e.g. mouse grey matter, hippocampus, dorsal root ganglion and spinal cord.

Animals have evolved a greater diversity of cell types in a multicellular body (100–150 different cell types), compared with 10–20 in plants, fungi, and protists. The exact number of cell types is, however, undefined, and the Cell Ontology, as of 2021, lists over 2,300 different cell types.

== Multicellular organisms ==
Nearly all multicellular organisms contain cells specialised for different functions. Most distinct cell types arise from a single totipotent cell that differentiates into hundreds of different cell types during the course of development. Differentiation of cells is driven by different environmental cues (such as cell–cell interaction) and intrinsic differences (such as those caused by the uneven distribution of molecules during division).

Animals and many other sexually reproducing organisms are composed of cells that fall into two fundamental types: germ cells and somatic cells. During animal development, somatic cells become more specialized and form the three primary germ layers: ectoderm, mesoderm, and endoderm. After formation of the three germ layers, cells continue to differentiate until they reach a terminally differentiated state that is much more resistant to changes in cell type than its progenitors.

The simplest organism considered to have well defined cell types are some volvoceans, such as Volvox carteri, in which each organism is composed of distinct and interdependent cell populations, some somatic and some reproductive.

== Conceptual definition ==
Even though the concept of cell type is widely used, specialists still discuss the exact definition of what constitutes a cell type.

== Humans ==
A list of cell types in the human body may include several hundred distinct types depending on the source.

A 2006 peer-reviewed article by Vickaryous and Hall listed 411 distinct human cell types.

== See also ==
- List of distinct cell types in the adult human body
- List of human cell types derived from the germ layers
- Stem cell
- Types of plant cells
