= Neurogliaform cell =

Type of interneuron

Neurogliaform cells (NGF) are inhibitory (GABAergic) interneurons found in the cortex and the hippocampus. NGF cells represent approximately 10% of the total hippocampal inhibitory interneuron population.

In terms of morphology, they are comparatively small and have an unusually high presynaptic bouton density. Almost all NGF neurons express neuropeptide Y (NPY) and are commonly positive for other signalling and non-signalling peptides, including reelin, α-actinin 2, COUP-TFII, and neuronal nitric oxide synthase (nNOS). However, populations of NGF cells which do not express NPY have been reported in both cortical layer I and the striatum.

Developmentally, in the cortex, all NGF cells are derived from caudal ganglionic eminence (CGE) but NGF cells of the hippocampus have their origins within both the CGE and the medial ganglionic eminence (MGE).

Functionally, NGF cells are GABAergic and their function in the mature brain is inhibition. However, they are suspected to signal more through volume transmission as opposed to the typical chemical synapse. One study found that approximately 78% of neurogliaform cell boutons did not form classical synapses and also indicated that their synaptic boutons are at a larger than usual distance from their target dendrites. Taken together, this and other observations has led to the consensus that NGF cells are likely not involved primarily with “point to point” synaptic transmission but release GABA in a target independent, cloud-like manner to generate a non specific form of inhibitory control (volume transmission).

== See also ==
List of distinct cell types in the adult human body
