= Lactocyte =

Cells that produce milk

Details
- System: Exocrine system
- Location: Mammary gland
- Shape: Cuboidal
- Function: Milk secretion

Lactocytes are cells that synthesize and secrete milk within the mammary glands of lactating mammals. In preparation of lactation, lactocytes differentiate from luminal adaptive secretory precursor (LASP) cells found in the resting mammary gland.

== Terminology ==
The terminology used for mammary epithelial cells like lactocytes has been fairly inconsistent in the literature. Lactocytes have been called lactating mammary epithelial cells (lactating MECs), or just referred to as lactating cells. In the case of humans, they have also been called breast lactating cells. However, some similar terms like "breast secretory cell", "luminal secretory cell", or "alveolar cell" are often confusingly used to the refer to the LASP cells (lactocyte precursors).

== Milk synthesis ==
Many of these processes are still under investigation. It is thought that nutrients are transported to mammary alveoli by transport proteins on the membranes of mammary epithelial cells. Milk proteins are synthesized in the endoplasmic reticulum and packaged into secretory vesicles, alveolar cells add nutrients such as calcium, zinc, phosphate, lactose, and citrate, and the milk is transported from the lactocyte via exocytosis. Lipids are wrapped in a membrane and secreted as milk fat globules. Other transport proteins uptake nutrients from the blood and from interstitial fluid.

== Structure ==
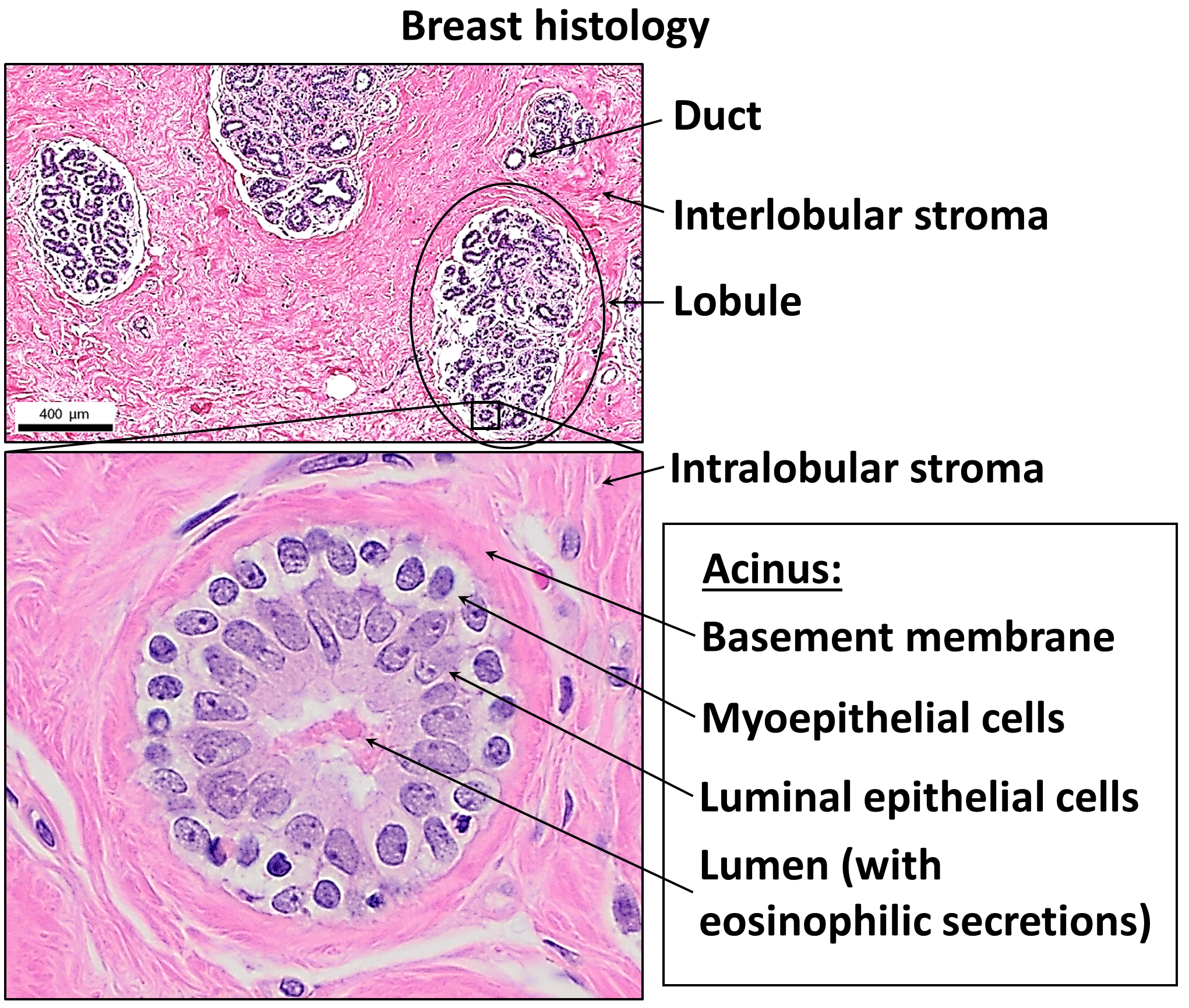
Normal histology of a breast

The primary secreting components of the mammary gland are the alveoli, which are small cavities surround by cells. In lactating mammals, a bulb-like lumen (cavity) is lined by lactocytes, which secrete milk into the lumen. The lactocytes are surrounded by a second layer of cells, called basal-myoepithelial (B-myo) cells, which function like muscle cells to squeeze milk out of the lobules (groups of alveoli) and into the milk ducts during suckling.

== Origin and stages ==
Before pregnancy, the innermost (luminal) layer of mammary ductal tissue consists of two types of epithelial cell: the luminal hormone sensing (LHS) cells and the luminal adaptive secretory precursor (LASP) cells. During pregnancy, the LHS cells receive signals from hormones (especially estrogen, progesterone, prolactin, and human placental lactogen) and pass these signals onto nearby LASP cells, which subsequently differentiate into lactocytes.

Following secretory differentiation, pregnancy hormones suppress the lactocytes, reducing their size and function. Upon delivery of the placenta, the resulting significant drop in progesterone allows prolactin to stimulate milk synthesis and secretion in the alveoli. Initially, there are large intercellular gaps between lactocytes, allowing high transfer of maternal plasma components to enter the milk, and colostrum - the initial, immature, and highly beneficial milk - is produced. As the intercellular gaps are bridged by an apical junctional complex and the number of lactocytes increase, they begin to produce "mature" breast milk.

== Milk secretion and regulation ==
Lactocytes secrete milk in a slow but mostly continuous fashion. However, suckling triggers a spike in the release of the hormone prolactin from the pituitary gland, which stimulates the lactocytes to increase their production of milk to prepare for the next feeding.

The mechanisms that pause milk production and control the amount of milk produced remain poorly understood. Some have hypothesized the existence of a protein (or multiple proteins), they term "feedback inhibitor of lactation", which accumulates and stops milk production. The existence and identity of this protein have yet to be definitively proven, but recently some have suggested that serotonin may be part of this.

As the lactocytes produce milk globules within the alveoli, intra-alveolar pressure stretches the lactocytes which prevents the cells from producing and "pinching off" fatty globule membranes, causing a reduced fat content. As the milk is removed, pressure reduces, and the fat content of the milk increases.
