= Trichocyte (algae) =

Algal cell type

Trichocyte in algae are cells which grow on the outside of the thallus, from which hairs grow. In algae, trichocytes grow principally over the summer; their growth is mediated by water temperature and day length.
