= Trichocyte (human) =

Cells that make hair and nails

In mammals, trichocytes are the specialized epithelial cells from which the highly mechanically resilient tissues hair and nails are formed. They can be identified by the fact that they express "hard", "trichocyte" or "hair" keratin proteins. These are modified keratins containing large amounts of the amino acid cysteine, which facilitates chemical cross-linking of these proteins to form the tough material from which hair and nail is composed. These cells give rise to non-hair non-keratinized IRSC (inner root sheath cell) as well.

== See also ==
- List of human cell types derived from the germ layers
- List of distinct cell types in the adult human body
