= Fork cell =

Type of neuron

A fork cell, also known as a fork neuron, is a type of neuron found in the human brain, located in the anterior cingulate cortex (ACC) and frontoinsular cortex (FI). This type of neuron is characterized by its own morphology - two primary apical dendrites, giving them a distinctive 'forked' appearance. Fork cells are found in humans and some other highly evolved species.

== Structure and distribution ==
Fork cells have a triangular cell body and a single prominent basal dendrite. In the frontoinsular cortex, they occur alongside von Economo neurons, which have an elongated cell body and one apical dendrite. Fork cells also occur in the anterior cingulate cortex. In macaques, they are concentrated in layer 5b of the anterior agranular insula. Neurons with this shape have also been described in other mammals, including sheep and horses.

A study of the mouse insular cortex identified a small number of neurons expressing Fezf2 with two apical dendrites. The authors described them as fork cell-like neurons and proposed that they might be the mouse counterparts of human fork cells.

== Molecular characteristics ==
Human fork cells share several molecular markers with von Economo neurons and some nearby pyramidal neurons, including VMAT2, GABRQ and ADRA1A. In the human frontoinsular cortex, single-nucleus RNA sequencing and follow-up tissue staining identified an excitatory neuron group with a shared gene expression profile that included fork cells, von Economo neurons and some pyramidal neurons.

== Clinical significance ==
Frontoinsular fork cells and von Economo neurons are particularly vulnerable to degeneration in the behavioral variant of frontotemporal dementia. In type B frontotemporal lobar degeneration with TDP-43 pathology, affected fork cells can show shrinkage of the cell body and dendrites alongside TDP-43 inclusions in the cytoplasm or depletion of TDP-43 from the nucleus.

== History ==
Santiago Ramón y Cajal noted these neurons in 1900, and Constantin von Economo and Georg N. Koskinas described them briefly in 1925. In 1932, G. Ngowyang published a detailed account of their shape and distribution and called them Gabelzellen, German for "fork cells".

== See also ==
- Von Economo neuron
