= Vitelline =

Vitelline may refer to:

== Embryology ==
- Vitelline arteries, arteries that bring blood to the yolk sac
- Vitelline circulation, the system of blood flowing between an embryo and its yolk sac
- Vitelline cyst, a developmental defect relating to the closure of the vitelline duct
- Vitelline duct, a tube that joins the yolk sac to the midgut lumen of a human embryo
- Vitelline membrane, membrane surrounding an ovum
- Vitelline veins, veins that drain blood from the yolk sac

== Birds ==
- Vitelline masked weaver (Ploceus vitellinus), a species of bird endemic to Africa
- Vitelline warbler (Setophaga vitellina), a songbird species found in the Cayman Islands and Honduras

== See also ==
- Vitellin, a protein found in egg yolk
- Vitelli, a surname
