= Elton (name) =

Elton is both a surname and a male given name of English origin. Notable people with the name include:

== Surname ==
- Sir Arthur Elton, 7th Baronet (1818–1883), English politician
- Sir Arthur Elton, 10th Baronet (1906–1973), English pioneer in documentaries
- Ben Elton (born 1959), English comedian
- Charles Abraham Elton (1778–1853), English soldier and author
- Charles Isaac Elton (1839–1900), English lawyer, politician, writer and antiquarian
- Charles Sutherland Elton (1900–1991), English biologist
- Ed Elton (born 1939), American economist
- Edmund Elton (1870–1952), English actor and singer
- Sir Edmund Elton, 8th Baronet (1846–1920)
- Ernest Elton (1893-1958), British non-commissioned flying ace
- Frederick Cockayne Elton (1832–1888), British officer, received the Victoria Cross
- Geoffrey Elton (1921–1994), German-born British historian
- Harry Elton (1930–2004), Canadian television producer
- John Elton (died 1751), English shipbuilder and seaman, adventurer in Persia
- John Prince Elton (1809–1864), American businessman
- Kim Elton (born 1948), American politician
- Lewis Elton (1923–2018), German-born British researcher into higher education
- Oliver Elton (1861–1945), English literary scholar
- Richard Elton (fl. 1650), English soldier and writer
- Robert M. Elton (1932–2024), American general
- Todd Elton (born 1993), Australian rules footballer
- William Elton (1847–1903), English comedian in US and Australia

== Given name ==
=== Musicians and entertainers ===
- Elton (television presenter) (born 1971), German comedian and host of Elton TV
- Elton Ahi (born 1964), Persian music producer
- Elton Anderson (1930–1984), American singer
- Elton Britt (1913–1972), stage name of James Elton Baker, American country music singer-songwriter
- Elton Dean (1945–2006), English saxophonist
- Elton Hayes (1915-2001), British actor and guitarist
- Elton Ibrahimov (born 1994), Azerbaijani singer and dancer
- Elton John (born 1947), English musician

=== Athletes (association football) ===
- Elton Acolatse (born 25 July 1995), Dutch professional footballer
- Élton Arábia (born 7 April 1986), Brazilian footballer
- Elton Junior Melo Ataíde (born 17 March 1990), Brazilian footballer
- Elton Basriu (born 3 August 1987 in Elbasan), Albanian footballer
- Élton Rodrigues Brandão (born 1 August 1985), Brazilian footballer
- Elton Brown (born 22 May 1982), American football player
- Elton Calé (born 12 July 1988), Brazilian footballer
- Elton Çeno (born 19 June 1976), Albanian retired football player
- Elton da Costa (born 15 December 1979), Brazilian footballer
- Elton Doku (born 1 October 1986), Albanian footballer
- Élton Fensterseifer (1937–2010), Brazilian footballer
- Elton Figueiredo (born 12 February 1986), Brazilian footballer
- Elton Fikaj (born 18 October 2005), Albanian footballer
- Élton Giovanni (born 3 September 1983), Brazilian footballer
- Elton Hobson (1924–2020), Canadian football player
- Elton John (footballer) (born 8 April 1987), Trinidadian footballer
- Elton Kabangu (born 8 February 1998), Belgian professional footballer
- Elton Koça (born 5 May 1973), Albanian footballer
- Elton Lira (born 21 September 1986), Brazilian footballer
- Elton Monteiro (born 22 February 1994), Portuguese footballer
- Elton Muçollari (born 14 September 1980), Albanian retired footballer
- Elton Ngwatala (born 23 May 1993), French professional footballer
- Elton Aparecido de Souza (born May 1985), Brazilian footballer
- Elton Taylor (1932-1997), Canadian football player
- Elton Vata (born 13 April 1998), Albanian footballer
- Elton Williams (footballer) (born 4 July 1973), Guyanese-born Montserratian international football player

=== Athletes (other sports) ===
- Elton Brand (born 11 March 1979), American basketball manager and former player
- Elton Brown (basketball) (born 15 September 1983), American basketball player
- Elton Dharry (born 1 December 1985), Guyanese professional boxer
- Elton Flatley (born 7 May 1977), Australian former rugby union footballer
- Elton Hermansson (born 5 February 2008), Swedish ice hockey player
- Elton Jantjies (born 1 August 1990), South African rugby player
- Elton Julian (born 16 August 1974), American professional racing driver
- Elton McGriff (1942–2011), American basketball player
- Elton Moncrieff (born 8 June 1972), New Zealand rugby player
- Elton Patterson (born 3 June 1981), former gridiron footballer
- Elton Plummer (1914-1988), Australian rules footballer
- Elton Pollock (born 17 April 1973), American college basketball coach
- Elton Rasmussen (1937–1978), Australian rugby league footballer
- Elton Rynearson (1893-1967), American athlete, coach, and administrator
- Elton Sawyer (born 5 November 1959), American NASCAR driver
- Elton Tsang (born 1980), Chinese Canadian poker player
- Elton Veals (1961–2023), American former gridiron football player
- Elton Welsby (born 28 May 1951), English television sports presenter
- Elton Wieman (1896-1971), American football player and coach
- Elton Williams (cricketer) (born 19 September 1973), South African cricketer

=== Other people ===
- Elton D. Aberle, American animal scientist
- Elton Bennett (1910–1974), American artist
- Elton Bomer (born 1935), American politician
- Elton Chong (born 1955), South Korean actor
- Elton L. Daniel, historian and Iranologist
- Elton Engstrom Jr. (1935-2013), American lawyer, businessman, writer and politician
- Elton Engstrom Sr. (1905-1963), American businessman and politician
- Elton Fax (1909-1993), American illustrator, cartoonist and author
- Elton Gallegly (born 1944), American politician
- Elton Georges (1943-2018), British Virgin Islander politician and businessman
- Elton Gissendanner (1927–2023), American politician
- Elton Glaser, American poet
- Elton Anthony Carlisle Inniss (1947–2010), one of the Mangrove Nine
- Elton N. Kaufmann (born 1943), American materials scientist
- Elton Joe Kendall (born 1954), American judge
- Elton Leme, Brazilian botanist
- Elton Joseph Mabirizi, Ugandan politician
- Elton Mangoma, Zimbabwean politician
- Elton Mayo (1880–1949), Australian psychologist and sociologist
- Elton Redalen (1926-2009), American farmer and politician
- Elton Rule (1917-1990), American television executive and former president of the American Broadcasting Company
- Elton Raymond Shaw (1886–1955), American author and churchman
- Elton Bryson Stephens Sr. (1911–2005), American businessman and philanthropist
- Elton Watkins (1881–1956), American politician
- Elton Younger (1919–2010), British army general

== See also ==
- Alton (given name)
- Alton (surname)
- Helton (name), a similar name
