= Blood islands =

Structures around the developing embryo

Blood island of the umbilical vesicle
- Time-lapse movie of blood islands in a chick embryo. The large green fluorescently highlighted clusters are blood islands.

Details
- Carnegie stage: 6a
- Days: 21
- Precursor: Mesoderm

Identifiers
- Latin: Insula sanguinea vesiculae umbilicalis
- TE: islands_by_E5.11.2.0.0.0.4 E5.11.2.0.0.0.4

Blood islands are structures around the developing embryo which lead to many different parts of the circulatory system. Blood islands arise external to the developing embryo on the umbilical vesicle, allantois, connecting stalk and chorion. They are also known as Pander's islands or Wolff's islands, after Heinz Christian Pander or Caspar Friedrich Wolff.

== Development ==
In humans, the formation of extraembryonic blood vessels starts at the beginning of the third week after fertilization. Vasculogenesis begins as mesodermal cells differentiate into hemangioblasts, which in turn differentiate into angioblasts. Clusters of angioblasts make up the blood islands.

Within the blood islands, lumens begin to appear by the growth of intercellular clefts. The flattened cells at the periphery form the endothelium. Mesenchymal cells exterior to this form the muscular and connective tissue components of blood vessels.

Roughly 3 weeks after fertilization, red blood cells, still with a nucleus, and blood plasma develop outside the embryo. They develop from undifferentiated hemangioblasts in blood vessels in the walls of the umbilical vesicle, allantois and chorion. In either case the mass thus formed projects from and is attached to the wall of the vessel. Later the cells on the surface round-up, giving the mass a mulberry-like appearance. Then the red blood cells break loose and are carried away in the plasma. Such free blood cells continue to divide.

Blood islands will sprout endothelial projections and these projections will fuse. This forms a plexiform network of blood vessels. Over time, the network will continue to grow, and will eventually penetrate the embryo proper and fuse with the concurrently developing embryonic circulation. Consequently, some blood islands end up inside the embryo proper, while others remain in the annexes.

== Sources ==
The blood islands and vessels outside of the embryo is initially the sole source of blood cells and plasma, beginning 3 weeks after fertilization. Blood formation inside the embryo proper begins around 5 weeks after fertilization in the liver, and at the twelfth week in the spleen, red bone marrow and thymus.

Blood islands have been seen in the area vasculosa in the vitelline veins and arteries, and in the dorsal aorta.
