= D'Alton =

D'Alton is both a surname and a given name of Norman origin found in Ireland and Britain and places where people from those backgrounds emigrated to. The Hiberno-Norman sept ruled over Rathconrath, previously known as D'Alton country, and surrounding areas of Westmeath from the Norman invasion of Ireland in 1169 until the Cromwellian Conquest of Ireland in 1649.

Notable people with the name include:

== Surname ==
- Alexandre d'Alton (1776–1859), French Army general during the Napoleonic Wars
- Eduard Joseph d'Alton (1772–1840), German engraver and naturalist
- Johann Samuel Eduard d'Alton (1803–1854), German anatomist, son of Eduard d'Alton
- John D'Alton (1882–1963), Irish Roman Catholic cardinal and Primate of All Ireland
- John D'Alton (historian) (1792–1867), Irish lawyer, historian, biographer and genealogist
- Rob D'Alton (born 1923), Irish sailor and Olympian
- Thomas D'Alton (1895–1968), Australian politician

== Given name ==
- D'Alton Corry Coleman (1879–1956), Canadian businessman
- D'Alton or Dalton McCarthy (1836–1898), Canadian lawyer and parliamentarian

== See also ==
- Dalton (disambiguation)
- Alton (disambiguation)
