= Alton =

Alton may refer to:

== People ==
- Alton (given name)
- Alton (surname)

== Places ==
=== Australia ===
- Alton National Park, Queensland
- Alton, Queensland, a town in the Shire of Balonne

=== Canada ===
- Alton, Ontario
- Alton, Nova Scotia

=== New Zealand ===
- Alton, New Zealand, in Taranaki

=== United Kingdom ===
- Alton, Derbyshire, England
- Alton, Hampshire, England
  - Alton Abbey
  - Alton College
- Alton, Leicestershire, England
- Alton, Staffordshire, England
  - Alton Castle, presently a Catholic youth retreat centre
  - Alton Towers, theme park, formerly a country estate Alton Mansion
- Alton, Wiltshire, England, a civil parish
- Alton, a hamlet in Figheldean parish, Wiltshire
- Alton Estate, Roehampton, Greater London, England
- Alton Water, a manmade reservoir in Suffolk

=== United States ===
- Alton, Alabama, an unincorporated community
- Alton, California, an unincorporated community
- Alton, Florida, an unincorporated community
- Alton, Illinois, a city
- Alton, Indiana, a town
- Alton, Iowa, a city
- Alton, Kansas, a city
- Alton, Kentucky, an unincorporated community
- Alton, Maine, a town
- Alton Township, Waseca County, Minnesota
- Alton, Michigan, an unincorporated community
- Alton, Missouri, a city
- Alton, New Hampshire, a New England town
  - Alton (CDP), New Hampshire, the main village in the town
- Alton, New York, a hamlet
- Alton, Rhode Island, a village
- Alton, Texas, a city
- Alton, Utah, a town
- Alton, Virginia, an unincorporated community
- Alton, West Virginia, an unincorporated community

== History ==
- First Battle of Alton, 1001
- Treaty of Alton, signed in 1101 by Henry I of England and his older brother Robert, Duke of Normandy
- Battle of Alton, fought in 1643 during the English Civil War

== Transportation ==
- Alton Railroad, a railroad linking Chicago, St. Louis, and Kansas City, Missouri
- Alton station (Illinois), an Amtrak station in Alton, Illinois
- Alton Junction, a railroad junction in Chicago, Illinois
- Alton line, a railway line in southeast England
- Alton railway station, in Alton, Hampshire, England
- Basingstoke and Alton Light Railway, Hampshire, England
- Alton Park railway station serving Lord Mayor Treloar's hospital near Alton, Hampshire, England
- Alton Towers railway station, in Alton, Staffordshire, England; formerly Alton station
- Alton Junction, Utah, a highway junction in Utah
- Alton station (Iowa), a Chicago & North Western station in Alton, Iowa

== Other uses ==
- Alton Steel, a steel manufacturer based in Alton, Illinois
- The Alton family, in Marion Zimmer Bradley's Darkover novels

== See also ==
- North Alton, Nova Scotia
- South Alton, Nova Scotia
- D'Alton
- Altun Ha, ruins of an ancient Mayan city in Belize
- Elton (disambiguation)
