= Vitelline circulation =

System of blood flow

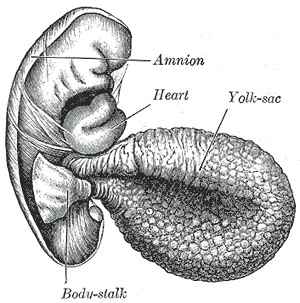
Human embryo of 2.6 mm.

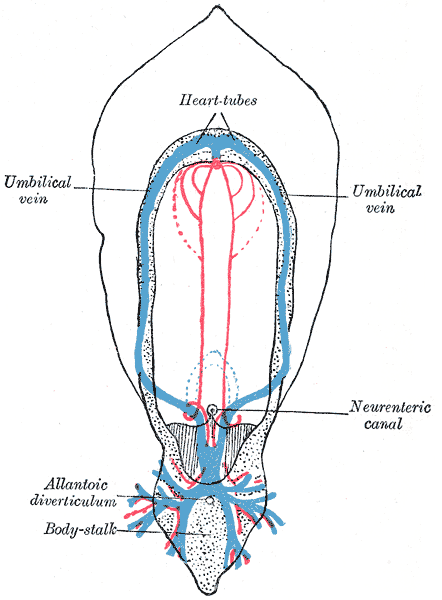
Diagram of the vascular channels in a human embryo of the second week. (After Eternod.) The red lines are the dorsal aortae continued into the umbilical arteries. The red dotted lines are the ventral aortae, and the blue dotted lines the vitelline veins.

Vitelline circulation refers to the system of blood flowing from the embryo to the yolk sac and back again.

The yolk-sac is situated on the ventral aspect of the embryo; it is lined by endoderm, outside of which is a layer of mesoderm. It is filled with fluid, the vitelline fluid, which is utilized for the nourishment of the embryo during the earlier stages of its existence. Blood is conveyed to the wall of the sac by the vitelline arteries (a branch of the dorsal aorta), and after circulating through a wide-meshed capillary plexus, is returned by the vitelline veins to the tubular heart of the embryo. This constitutes the vitelline circulation, and by means of it nutritive material is absorbed from the yolk-sac and conveyed to the embryo.
