= Helton (name) =

Helton is a forename and a surname of Old English origin. It is derived from the family that lived in the village of Elton in Cheshire, England. The village's motto is Artibus et armis. It is also the name of a village in Cumbria, England. Variants of the name include: Eltone, Elton, and Ellton. People with the Helton surname or given name include:

== Surname ==
Helton
Origin
- Meaning: "Artibus et armis"
- Region of origin: England

Other names
- Variant forms: Eltone, Elton, Ellton

- Barry and Sally Childs-Helton, American, filk writers and singers
- Arthur Helton (1949–2003) American, lawyer, refugee advocate, teacher and author who died in the Canal Hotel Bombing in Baghdad
- Barry Helton (born 1965), American football player
- Brian Helton (born 1970), American politician from West Virginia
- Clay Helton (born 1972), American football coach
- Derrick Helton (born 1985), American Paralympic wheelchair rugby player
- Jo Helton (1933–2021), American actress and social worker
- John Helton (born 1946), Canadian football player
- John William Helton (born 1945), American mathematician
- Kim Helton (born 1948), American, football offensive coordinator for the University of Alabama at Birmingham
- Kyle Helton (born 1986), American soccer player
- Mike Helton (born c. 1953), American, president of NASCAR
- Percy Helton (1894–1971), American actor
- R. J. Helton (born 1981), American singer
- Roy Helton (1886–1977), American poet
- Sam Helton (1954–2016), American politician from Oklahoma
- Todd Helton (born 1973), American baseball player
- Zykie Helton (born 2008), American football player
- Chad Helton (born 1982), Crazy Faith Designs-Promoting those that promote JESUS

== Given name ==
Helton
- Gender: Male

- Helton Samo Cunha (born 1980), Mozambican soccer player
- Helton Arruda (born 1978), Brazilian football (soccer) player
- Helton Dos Reis (born 1988), French footballer
- Helton Godwin Baynes (1882–1943), English analytical psychologist and author
- Helton Soares (born 1974), Brazilian footballer
- Helton Yomura (born 1984), Brazilian lawyer and politician

== See also ==
- List of Old English (Anglo-Saxon) surnames
- Elton (name), a similar name
