= Elton =

Elton may refer to:

== Places ==
=== England ===
- Elton, Cambridgeshire (formerly Huntingdonshire), a village
  - Elton Hall, a baronial hall
- Elton, Cheshire, a village and civil parish
- Elton, County Durham, a village and civil parish in the Borough of Stockton-on-Tees
- Elton, Derbyshire, a village
- Elton, Greater Manchester, a suburb of Bury
- Elton, Herefordshire, a village and civil parish

=== United States ===
- Elton, Louisiana, a town
- Elton, Michigan, ghost town
- Elton, Nebraska, ghost town
- Elton, New Jersey, an unincorporated community
- Elton, Pennsylvania
- Elton, West Virginia, an unincorporated community
- Elton, Wisconsin, an unincorporated community

=== Elsewhere ===
- Rural Municipality of Elton, Manitoba, Canada
- Elton, County Limerick, Ireland
- Lake Elton, Russia

== Other uses ==
- Elton (name), lists of people with the given name or surname
- Elton John, a British singer-songwriter and pianist
- Elton (television presenter), a German television presenter and comedian
  - Elton.tv, a German late-night talk show hosted by Elton
- Baron Elton, a title in the Peerage of the United Kingdom
- Elton baronets, a title in the Baronetage of Great Britain
- Elton Hotel, Waterbury, Connecticut, United States, on the National Register of Historic Places
- Elton awards, given annually by the British Council for innovation in English-language teaching

== See also ==
- Alton (disambiguation)
- Elton on the Hill, Nottinghamshire, England
