= Alton (given name) =

Alton (/ˈɔːltən/ AWL-tən, UK also /ˈɒltən/ OL-tən) is a given name. Notable people with the name include:

- Alton Adams (1889–1987), first African-American bandmaster in the U.S. Navy
- Alton Alexis (born 1957), former National Football League wide receiver
- Alton Brown (born 1962), American cinematographer, author, actor, and television personality
- Alton Brown (1925–2016), former Major League Baseball relief pitcher
- Alton Byrd (born 1957), American basketball player
- Alton Coleman (1955–2002), African-American spree killer
- Alton Ellis (1938–2008), Jamaican musician
- Alton Hornsby Jr. (1940–2017) American historian, educator, and writer
- Alton W. Knappenberger (1923–2008), U.S. Army soldier awarded the Medal of Honor in World War II
- Alton Lennon (1906–1986), U.S. Senator and Congressman from North Carolina
- Alton Lister (born 1958), American former National Basketball Association player
- Alton H. Maddox Jr. (1945–2023), American lawyer
- Alton Mason (born 1997), American fashion model
- Alton McCaskill (born 2003), American football player
- Alton Glen "Glenn" Miller (1904–1944), American big-band trombonist, arranger, composer and bandleader
- Alton Morgan (1932–2022), American businessman and politician
- Alton Ochsner (1896–1981), American surgeon and medical researcher
- Alton B. Parker (1852–1926), American lawyer, judge, and Democratic nominee for U.S. president in 1904
- Alton C. Parker (1907–1989), Canadian detective
- Alton Robinson (born 1998), American football player
- Alton D. Slay (1924–2015), U.S. Air Force four-star general
- Alton Thelwell (born 1980), English footballer
- Alton Tobey (1914–2005), American artist and teacher of art
- Alton Waldon (1936–2023), American politician

== See also ==
- Alton (disambiguation)
- Alton (surname)
- Elton (name), given name and surname
