= Elton de Souza =

Disambiguation page

Elton de Souza may refer to:

- Elton (footballer, born May 1985) (Elton Aparecido de Souza, born 1985), Brazilian football striker
- Elton de Souza (speed skater) (born 1991), French inline speed skater
