= Cardiovascular drift =

- Specialty: Cardiology

Cardiovascular drift (CVD, CV_{drift}) is the phenomenon where some cardiovascular responses begin a time-dependent change, or "drift", after around 5–10 minutes of exercise in a warm or neutral environment without an increase in workload. It is characterized by a progressive increase in heart rate accompanied by a decrease in stroke volume, while cardiac output is generally maintained through compensatory increases in heart rate. Depending on environmental conditions, exercise intensity, and hydration status, mean arterial pressure may remain relatively stable or decrease slightly during prolonged exercise. Reductions in stroke volume are largely attributable to increases in internal core temperature and reductions in central blood volume associated with dehydration and the accompanying cutaneous vasodilation. To facilitate heat dissipation, blood flow to the skin increases during prolonged exercise, promoting a redistribution of blood volume toward the cutaneous circulation and contributing to reductions in central venous return and stroke volume. The resulting reduction in stroke volume is largely compensated by a progressive increase in heart rate, thereby maintaining cardiac output over a wide range of exercise intensities. In warm environments, cardiovascular drift is associated with a reduction in maximal oxygen uptake measured immediately after the prolonged exercise bout, an effect that can be attenuated by adequate body cooling or by adapting exercise intensity.

== Implications for exercise prescriptions and monitoring ==
Cardiovascular drift also has important implications for exercise prescription and monitoring. During constant-speed or constant-power exercise, the progressive increase in heart rate causes exercise intensity expressed as heart rate to drift upward over time. Conversely, when exercise intensity is prescribed by maintaining a constant heart rate (heart rate-clamped exercise), external workload (such as running speed or cycling power output) must be progressively reduced to compensate for the cardiovascular drift. Experimental studies have shown that heart rate-clamped exercise therefore produces lower external workload and oxygen uptake than constant-speed or constant-power exercise performed at the same initial physiological intensity. Recent randomized evidence suggests that these acute differences may also influence long-term training adaptations. In previously inactive adults, endurance training prescribed using constant running speed produced greater improvements in peak running speed and maximal oxygen uptake than training prescribed using a constant heart-rate target, despite identical initial exercise intensity prescriptions.
