= Norizam Ali Hassan =

Malaysian footballer

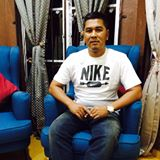

Personal information
- Full name: Norizam Ali bin Hassan
- Date of birth: 15 February 1976 (age 50)
- Place of birth: Kampung Tedong, Merlimau, Malacca, Malaysia

Senior career*
| Years | Team | Apps | (Gls) |
| 1996 | Malacca FA | | |
| 1997–1998 | Perak FA | | |
| 1999–2000 | Kedah FA | | |
| 2001–2002 | Perak FA | | |
| 2003–2004 | Malacca FA | | |
| 2005–2006 | Terengganu FA | | |
- * Club domestic league appearances and goals

Norizam Ali Hassan (born 15 February 1976) is a Malaysian former professional footballer who played as a forward. He formerly played with Malacca FA, Kedah FA, Terengganu FA and Perak FA.

Norizam once a winner of M-League golden boot with 13 goals in 2001. He retired after unsuccessful trials with others state and clubs.

Norizam was the assistant coach of Melaka United F.C. He is the owner of Kiddo Kickers Soccer Melaka.

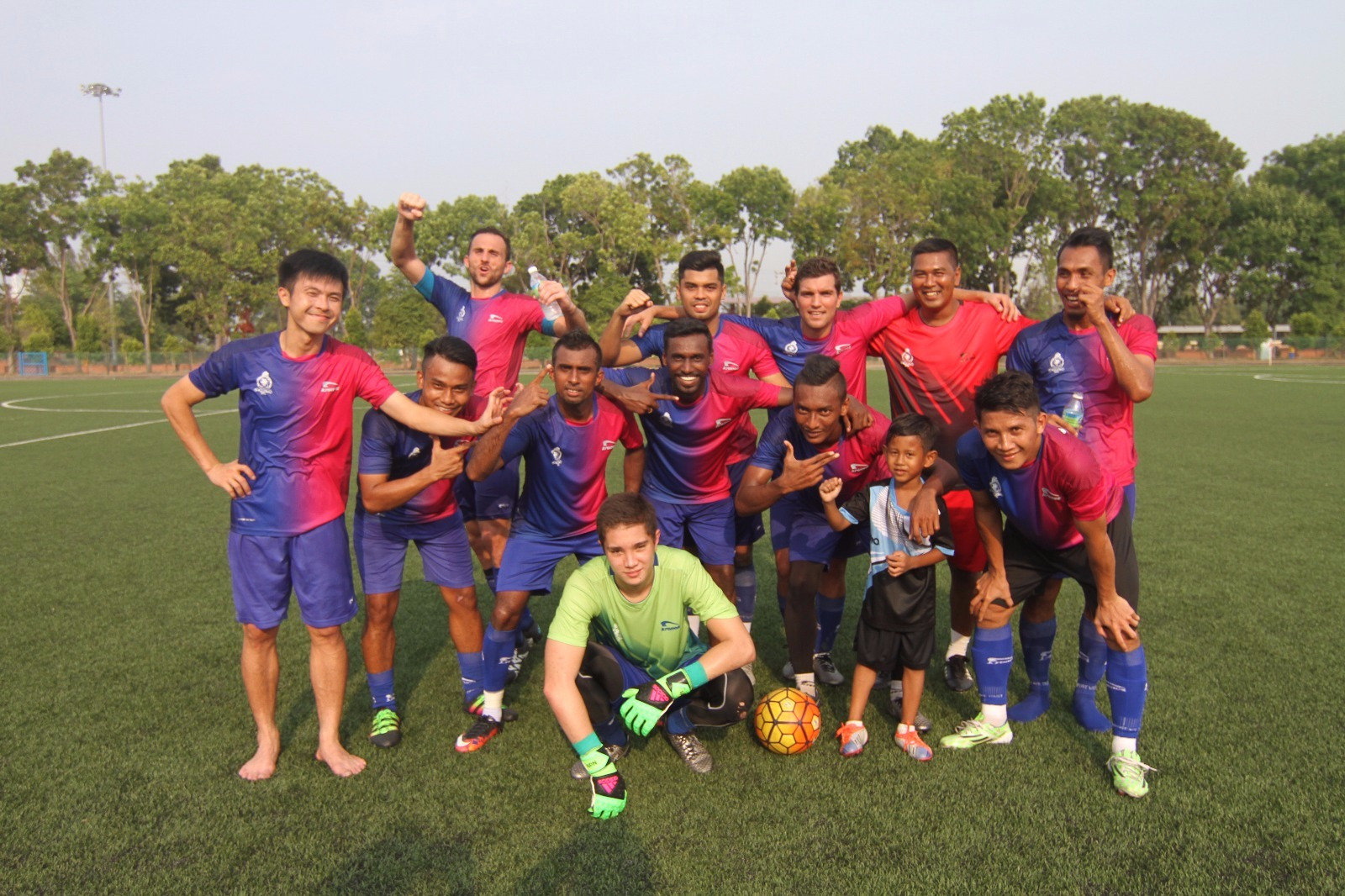
Norizam with 2016 Melaka United Players

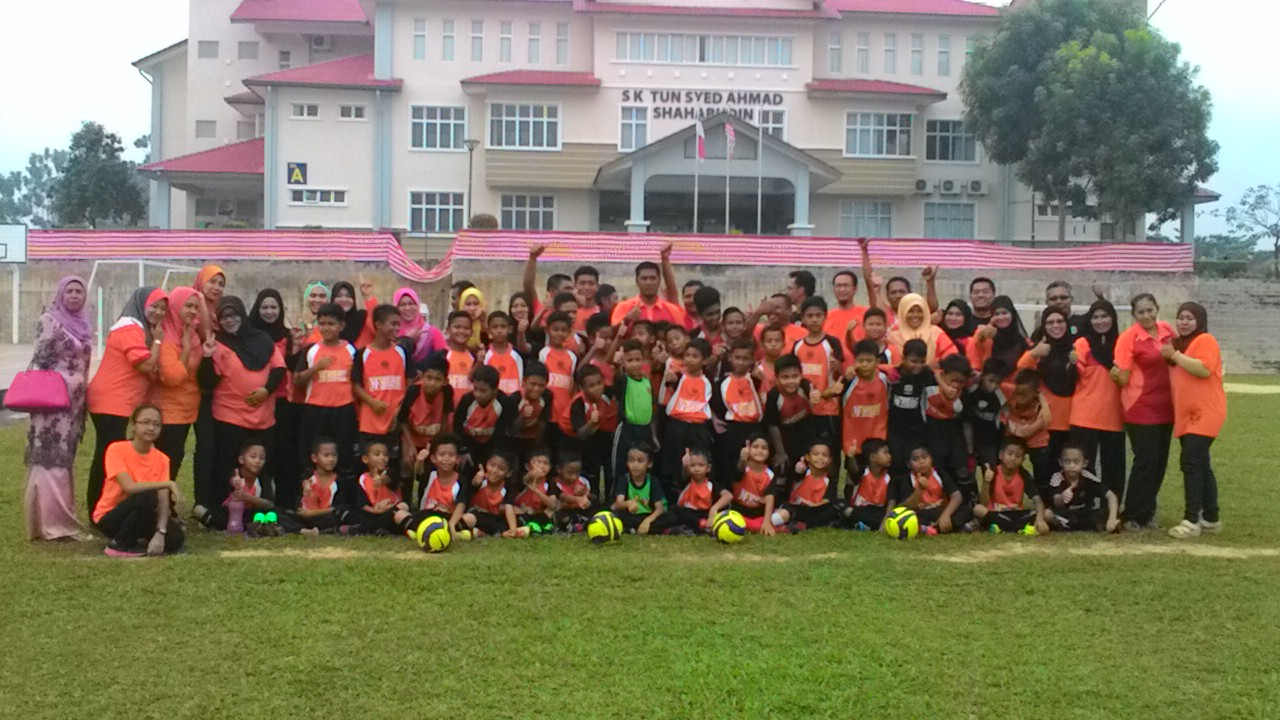
Norizam with Kiddo Kickers Soccer Melaka
