= Alton, Maine =

Town in Maine, United States

- Town
- Logo
- Motto: "A Little Town of Neighbors"
- Location within the state of Maine
- Coordinates: 45°01′38″N 68°45′34″W
- Country: United States
- State: Maine
- County: Penobscot

Area
  - Total: 42.55 sq mi (110.20 km^{2})
  - Land: 42.31 sq mi (109.58 km^{2})
  - Water: 0.24 sq mi (0.62 km^{2})
- Elevation: 197 ft (60 m)

Population (2020)
  - Total: 829
  - Density: 20/sq mi (7.6/km^{2})
- Time zone: UTC-5 (Eastern (EST))
  - Summer (DST): UTC-4 (EDT)
- ZIP code: 04468
- Area code: 207
- FIPS code: 23-01115
- GNIS feature ID: 582322
- Website: www.altonmaine.org

Alton is a town in Penobscot County, Maine, United States. It is part of the Bangor Metropolitan Statistical Area. The population was 829 at the 2020 census. The community is named after an Alton in England.

== Geography ==
According to the United States Census Bureau, the town has a total area of 42.55 square miles (110.20 km^{2}), of which 42.31 square miles (109.58 km^{2}) is land and 0.24 square miles (0.62 km^{2}) is water.

Alton is located on State Highway 16, approximately 18 miles north of Bangor and adjacent to Old Town. It is west of Interstate 95.

Although Alton is an independent municipality, it does not have its own ZIP code or post office. Alton mailing addresses are assigned to Old Town's ZIP code, while the nearest post offices by road are in Old Town and Hudson.

== Demographics ==
Historical population
Census	Pop.	Note	%±
1850	252		—
1860	531		110.7%
1870	508		−4.3%
1880	419		−17.5%
1890	348		−16.9%
1900	314		−9.8%
1910	259		−17.5%
1920	209		−19.3%
1930	209		0.0%
1940	286		36.8%
1950	314		9.8%
1960	303		−3.5%
1970	340		12.2%
1980	468		37.6%
1990	771		64.7%
2000	816		5.8%
2010	890		9.1%
2020	829		−6.9%
U.S. Decennial Census

=== 2010 census ===
As of the census of 2010, there were 890 people, 347 households, and 240 families living in the town. The population density was 21.0 inhabitants per square mile (8.1/km^{2}). There were 385 housing units at an average density of 9.1 per square mile (3.5/km^{2}). The racial makeup of the town was 97.5% White, 0.3% African American, 1.3% Native American, 0.3% Asian, and 0.4% from two or more races. Hispanic or Latino of any race were 0.4% of the population.

There were 347 households, of which 32.0% had children under the age of 18 living with them, 53.6% were married couples living together, 10.1% had a female householder with no husband present, 5.5% had a male householder with no wife present, and 30.8% were non-families. 21.0% of all households were made up of individuals, and 7.5% had someone living alone who was 65 years of age or older. The average household size was 2.56 and the average family size was 2.96.

The median age in the town was 39.3 years. 21.7% of residents were under the age of 18; 9.7% were between the ages of 18 and 24; 24.6% were from 25 to 44; 32.2% were from 45 to 64; and 11.7% were 65 years of age or older. The gender makeup of the town was 49.3% male and 50.7% female.

=== 2000 census ===
As of the census of 2000, there were 816 people, 309 households, and 241 families living in the town. The population density was 19.3 inhabitants per square mile (7.5/km^{2}). There were 347 housing units at an average density of 8.2 per square mile (3.2/km^{2}). The racial makeup of the town was 99.26% White, 0.12% African American, 0.25% Native American, 0.12% Asian, and 0.25% from two or more races. Hispanic or Latino of any race were 0.49% of the population.

There were 309 households, out of which 37.5% had children under the age of 18 living with them, 64.1% were married couples living together, 8.7% had a female householder with no husband present, and 22.0% were non-families. 16.2% of all households were made up of individuals, and 4.9% had someone living alone who was 65 years of age or older. The average household size was 2.64 and the average family size was 2.93.

In the town, the population was spread out, with 26.5% under the age of 18, 8.9% from 18 to 24, 34.8% from 25 to 44, 20.6% from 45 to 64, and 9.2% who were 65 years of age or older. The median age was 35 years. For every 100 females, there were 105.5 males. For every 100 females age 18 and over, there were 94.8 males.

The median income for a household in the town was $35,263, and the median income for a family was $35,809. Males had a median income of $31,250 versus $22,868 for females. The per capita income for the town was $14,204. About 12.4% of families and 12.8% of the population were below the poverty line, including 16.9% of those under age 18 and 14.6% of those age 65 or over.
