= Mohd Yusof Ishak =

Malaysian footballer

Mohd Yusof
Personal information
- Full name: Mohd Yusof Ishak
- Date of birth: 9 August 1981 (age 45)
- Place of birth: Malaysia
- Position: Goalkeeper

Senior career*
Years	Team	Apps	(Gls)
2005–2007	Johor FC		
2007–2008	Perlis FA		
- * Club domestic league appearances and goals

Mohd Yusof Ishak (born 9 August 1981) is a Malaysian footballer who plays as goalkeeper. Yusof played for Perlis in the 2007 Malaysia Charity Shield, saving a penalty to beat Kedah and claim the cup. He was named Man-of-the-match after the game ended.
