= Helton Soares =

Brazilian footballer (born 1974)

Hélton Soares
Personal information
- Full name: Hélton Soares Pereira
- Date of birth: October 13, 1974 (age 52)
- Place of birth: Manaus, Brazil
- Height: 1.74 m (5 ft 9 in)
- Position: Midfielder

Team information
- Current team: Flamengo

Youth career
- Flamengo

Senior career*
Years	Team	Apps	(Gls)
1992–1996	Flamengo	8	(0)
1997–1998	Avaí	0	(0)
2003	Pahang FA	0	(0)
2004	Barreira	0	(0)
2005–2007	Terengganu FA	0	(0)
- * Club domestic league appearances and goals

Hélton Soares Pereira (born November 13, 1974) best known as Hélton Soraes, or simple, Hélton is a Brazilian former football player who became a player agent and scout.

In Brazil, he played for Flamengo from 1992 to 1996, Avaí for 1997–98, and Barreira in 2004. Overseas, he played for Arrayyan Sports Club for two seasons, and then Al-Wakrah Sports Club in Qatar.

He was signed to Pahang FA in Malaysia in 2003, and then played for Terengganu FA for a season and a half in 2005–2007. He then retired from playing and returned to Brazil.

Soares is the grandson of Brazilian soccer star "Didi," Valdir Pereira.
