= Christian Heinrich Pander =

Russian geologist and embryologist (1794–1865)

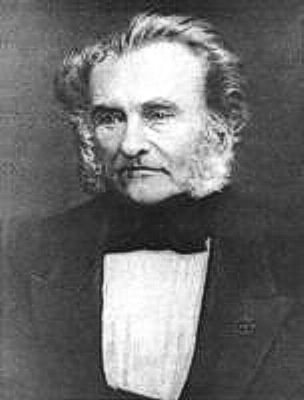
- Christian Heinrich Pander
- Born: 24 July [O.S. 13 July] 1794; Riga, Livonia Governorate, Russian Empire
- Died: 22 September [O.S. 10 September] 1865 (aged 71); Saint Petersburg, Russian Empire
- Scientific career
- Fields: Biology, embryology, paleontology
- Author abbrev. (botany): Pander

Christian Heinrich von Pander (Russian: Христиан Иванович Пандер, romanized: Khristian Ivanovich Pander; 24 July [O.S. 13 July] 1794 – 22 September [O.S. 10 September] 1865) was a Russian biologist and embryologist of Baltic German origin. He was among the first to identify distinct germ layers involved in the development of the embryo, coining the term "blastoderm". He has been considered as a "father of embryology" but he also worked on comparative anatomy, studying the skeletons of vertebrates, as well as fossils and geology.

== Biography ==
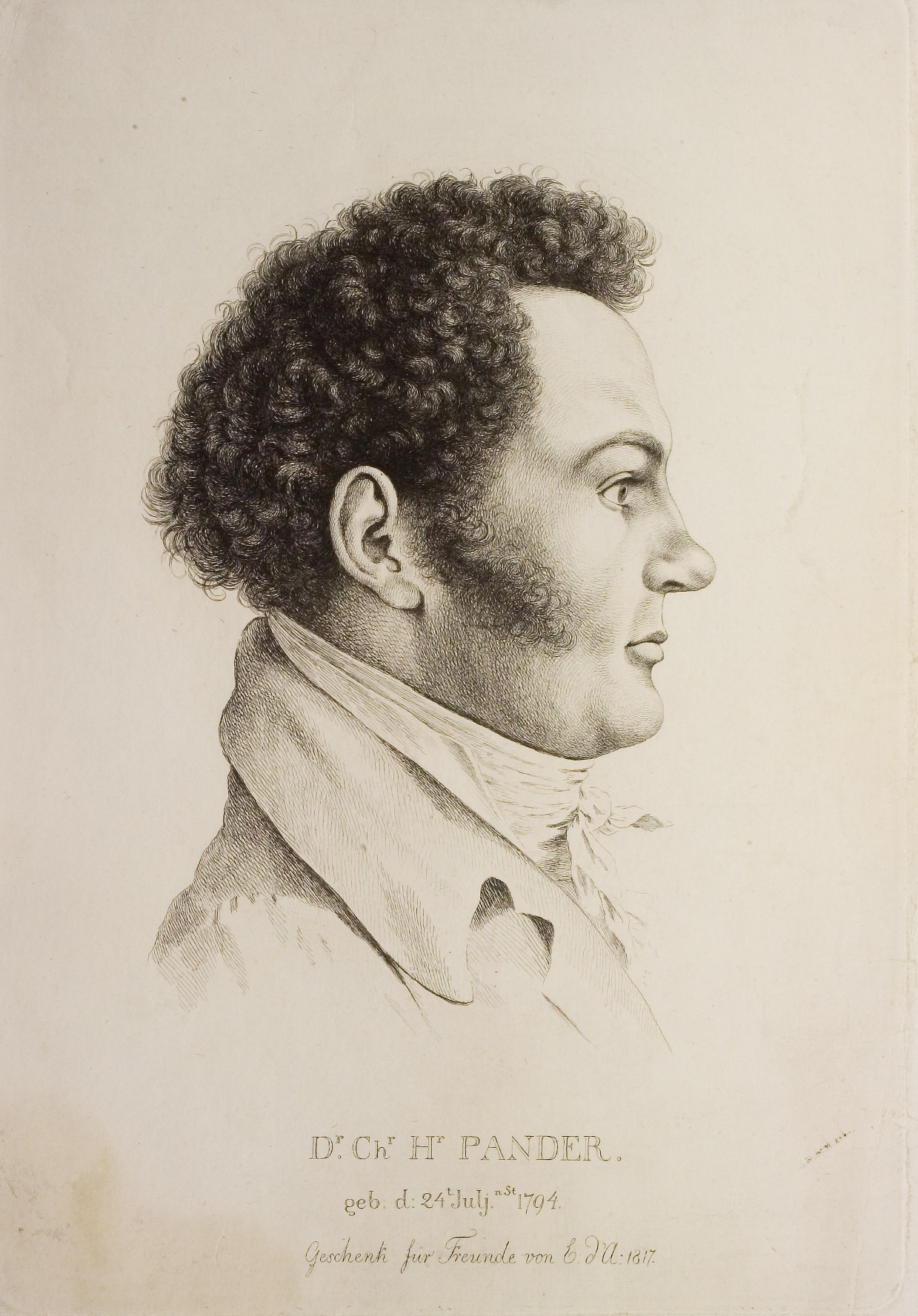

Pander was born in Riga of prosperous German parents. His father Johann Martin was a banker married to Ursula. Pander had three brothers and four sisters. He went to a German gymnasium in Riga and went to the University of Dorpat in 1812, where he was influenced by Karl Friedrich Burdach. He then went to Berlin in 1814, Göttingen in 1816 and in 1817 he received his medical degree from the University of Würzburg, studying the development of chick embryos. From 1818 to 1829 he travelled to European museums, examining specimens, particularly of animal skeletons along with Eduard d’Alton (1772-1840). He spent several years (1827–1842), performing scientific research from his estate in Carnikava (German: Zarnikau) on the banks of the Gauja River near Riga. In 1820 he worked as an adjunct in zoology at the St. Petersburg Academy of Sciences and took part in a scientific expedition to Bokhara as a naturalist. In 1826 he became a member of the Saint Petersburg Academy of Sciences. From 1833 he lived on his family estate at Zarnikau. Pander was supported by his father until 1842 when his father died leaving him without an inheritance. After this Pander had to take up work, and was employed by the department of mining in St. Petersburg. It was during this time that he examined fossils, including those of conodonts which he found in his own estate.

Pander married Amalie von Scherer in 1825, and they had three sons and four daughters.

== Biology ==
Pander worked under Ignaz Döllinger and studied the chick embryo and discovered the germ layers (i.e., three distinct regions of the embryo that give rise to the specific organ system). His dissertation titled Historia Metamorphoseos Quam Ovum Incubatum Prioribus Quinque Diebus Subit included illustrations made by Eduard d’Alton. Because of these findings, he is considered by many to be the "founder of embryology". His work in embryology was continued by Karl Ernst von Baer (1792–1876), who expanded Pander's concept of germ layers to include all vertebrates. In 1824 he suggested that there was a continuous change of metamorphism in plants and animals which would be cited by Darwin as a fore-runner of his own ideas.

Pander performed important studies in the field of paleontology, being known for his extensive research on fossils found in the Devonian and Silurian geological strata of the Baltic regions. His study of trilobites from this age led to the adjective 'Panderian', first used by the Canadian palaeontologist, Elkanah Billings. Pander is credited as the first scientist to describe primitive creatures known as conodonts.

Today the Pander Society is an international association of palaeontologists and stratigraphers with a common interest in the study of conodonts.

During travels in Turkestan in 1923 he contracted malaria and suffered subsequently. He died in Saint Petersburg following a surgery for kidney stones. His grave in the Smolenska Lutheran Cemetery is lost.

== Eponyms ==
Pander is remembered in Pander's islands or blood islands

== Selected writings ==
- Beiträge zur Entwickelungsgeschichte des Hühnchens im Eye, (Contributions to the embryology involving the chick egg), (1817).
- Beiträge zur Naturkunde aus den Ostseeprovinzen Rußlands, (Contributions on the natural history of the Baltic regions) Dorpat, (1820).
- Vergleichende Osteologie (Comparative osteology) seven volumes, with Eduard Joseph d'Alton, Bonn: Weber, (1821–1828).
- Beiträge zur geognosie des russischen reiches, (Contributions to the geology of the Russian Empire), 1830.
- Monographie der Fossilen Fische des silurischen Systems der Russisch-Baltischen Gouvernements (Monograph of fossil fish from the Silurian stratum of the Baltic regions), St. Petersburg, (1856).
- Ueber die Placodermen des devonischen Systems, (On placoderms of the Devonian system), 1857.
- Über die ctenodopterinen des devonischen systems, 1858
- Über die saurodipterinen, dendrodonten, glyptolepiden und cheirolepiden des devonischen systems, 1860.

== See also ==
- List of Baltic German scientists

== Sources ==
- "Пандер, Христиан Иванович" . Brockhaus and Efron Encyclopedic Dictionary (in Russian). 1906.
