= Alton, Alabama =

Unincorporated community in Alabama, United States

- Unincorporated community
- Location within Alabama Location within the United States
- Coordinates: 33°34′45″N 86°38′15″W
- Country: United States
- State: Alabama
- County: Jefferson
- Elevation: 781 ft (238 m)
- Time zone: UTC-6 (Central (CST))
  - Summer (DST): UTC-5 (CDT)
- ZIP code: 35015
- Area codes: 205, 659
- GNIS feature ID: 113052

Alton is an unincorporated community in Jefferson County, Alabama, United States. Alton is located along Interstate 459, 10 miles (16 km) east-northeast of downtown Birmingham. Alton has a post office with ZIP code 35015. Part of the community has been annexed into the city of Birmingham, while the remainder remains an unincorporated area surrounded by the city.

== Demographics ==
According to the returns from 1850-2010 for Alabama, it has never reported a population figure separately on the U.S. Census.
