= Rob D'Alton =

Irish Olympic sailor (1923–1996)

Robert Gordon "Rob" D'Alton (22 February 1923 – 17 August 1996) was an Irish sailor who competed in the 1964 Summer Olympics. He weighed 150 lbs. (68 kg)
