= Johann Samuel Eduard d'Alton =

German anatomist (1803–1854)

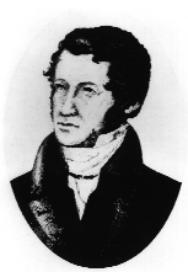
Johann Samuel Eduard d'Alton.

Johann Samuel Eduard d'Alton (17 July 1803 - 25 July 1854) was a German anatomist born in Sankt Goar. He was the son of engraver Eduard Joseph d'Alton (1772–1840).

He studied medicine at the University of Bonn, and subsequently taught anatomical drawing at the Berlin Academy of Arts (from 1827). After the death of Johann Friedrich Meckel (1781 to 1833), d'Alton was appointed his successor as professor of anatomy at the University of Halle. He maintained this position until his death in 1854. In 1838 he became a member of the Deutsche Akademie der Naturforscher Leopoldina.

His better known works were in the fields of comparative anatomy, development history and teratology. He is remembered for his masterful drawings of human and comparative anatomy.

== Written works ==
- Ueber das Nervensystem der Petromyzon (with Friedrich Schlemm; 1838) – On the nervous system of Petromyzon.
- De monstrorum duplicium origine (1849).
- Handbuch der vergleichenden Anatomie des Menschen (1850) – Handbook of comparative anatomy of man.
- De monstris, quibus extremitates superfluae suspensae sunt (1853).
- Der fossile Gavial von Boll in Württemberg (with Hermann Burmeister; 1854) – The fossil gavial of Boll in Württemberg.
