= Eduard Joseph d'Alton =

German engraver and naturalist (1772–1840)

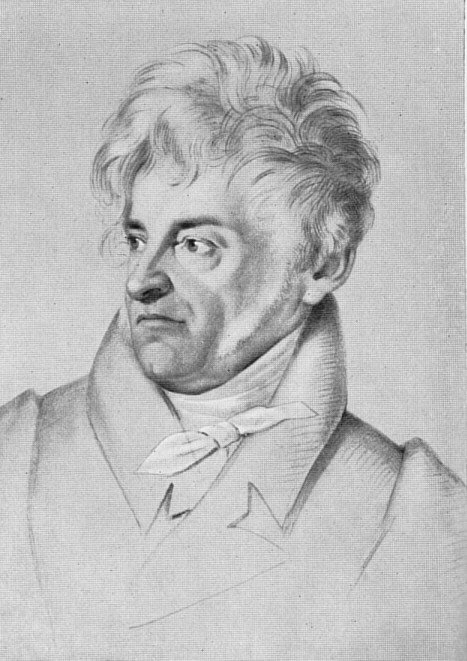
Joseph Wilhelm Eduard d'Alton.

Joseph Wilhelm Eduard d’Alton (August 11, 1772 – May 11, 1840) was a German engraver and naturalist who was a native of Aquileia (today part of Italy). He was the father of anatomist Johann Samuel Eduard d'Alton (1803–1854).

D'Alton was born in Aquileja, son of an Austrian officers. Originally trained for military service, he learned in Vienna, a thorough knowledge of horses and horsemanship. He later traveled throughout Italy, the Rhineland and France, and during this time period, gained an insight in the areas of natural and art history. At Würzburg he worked closely with embryologist Christian Heinrich Pander, and from 1818, he taught art history and architectural theory at the newly created University of Bonn, where in 1827 he became a "full professor" of art history. From 1831 to 1840, d'Alton was a member of the Prussian Academy of Arts. One of his famous students in Bonn was Karl Marx.

Eduard d'Alton is largely remembered for his anatomical and zoological engravings and etchings. He collaborated with Christian Pander on Vergleichende Osteologie, which was a series of monographs in the field of comparative osteology. In these works, d'Alton created engraved plates that portrayed the skeletal framework of numerous species, including the extinct megatherium. In Pander's 1817 treatise Beiträge zur Entwicklungsgeschichte des Hühnchens im Eye, d'Alton produced artistic images involving the embryonic development of a chicken.
