= Elton Williams (footballer) =

Montserratian footballer (born 1973)

Personal information
- Full name: Williams
- Date of birth: 4 July 1973 (age 53)
- Place of birth: Henrietta, Essequibo Coast, Guyana
- Height: 6 ft 0 in (1.83 m)
- Position: Defender

Team information
- Current team: Ideal SC

Senior career*
Years	Team	Apps	(Gls)
2004–	Ideal SC		

International career
2000–	Montserrat	4	(0)
- * Club domestic league appearances and goals

Elton Williams (born 4 July 1973) is a Guyanese-born Montserratian international football player who plays in defence for Ideal SC in the Montserrat Championship.
