= Elton Vata =

Albanian footballer

Personal information
- Date of birth: 13 April 1998 (age 28)
- Place of birth: Kukës, Albania
- Position: Goalkeeper

Team information
- Current team: Teuta
- Number: 1

Youth career
- 2011-2014: Teuta

Senior career*
Years	Team	Apps	(Gls)
2014–2016	Teuta	0	(0)
2016–2018	Laçi	8	(0)
2018–2020	Erzeni	45	(0)
2020–2021	Vora	18	(0)
2021–2022	Kastrioti	7	(0)
2022–2023	Tërbuni	20	(0)
2023–	Teuta	21	(0)
- * Club domestic league appearances and goals as of 6 March 2026

Elton Vata (born 13 April 1998) is an Albanian footballer who plays for Teuta as a goalkeeper.

== Club career ==
=== KF Laçi ===
In September 2016, Vata joined Albanian Superliga club KF Laçi. He made his league debut for the club on 26 November 2016 in a 1–0 away loss to Skënderbeu Korçë. He played all ninety minutes of the match.
