= Elton D. Aberle =

American animal scientist

- Born: Sabetha, Kansas, U.S.
- Education: University of Kansas; Michigan State University (MS, PhD)
- Scientific career
- Fields: Animal science, Meat science
- Workplaces: Purdue University; University of Nebraska–Lincoln; University of Wisconsin

Elton D. Aberle is an American animal scientist. He was born and raised on a small farm in Sabetha, Kansas. He earned a BS degree in animal husbandry from the Kansas State University, and MS and PhD degrees in Food Scienc, he became a professor in the Department of Animal Sciences at Purdue Universityfessor in the Department of Animal Sciences at Purdue University. He published a book along with John C. Forrest, David E. Gerard, and Edward W. Mills titled "Principles of meat science" in 1975. In 1983, he became chair of the Animal Sciences Department at the University of Nebraska–Lincoln, where he continued to work as a professor. In 1998, he joined the faculty of the University of Wisconsin, where he was named Dean of the College of Agricultural and Life Sciences He was also the director of the Wisconsin Agricultural Experimentation Station at the University of Wisconsin, Madison. He retired from this position in 2005. He was elected a Fellow of the American Association for the Advancement of Science in 2001. In 2008, he was awarded the R.C. Pollock Award by the American Meat Science Association for his excellence in the meat industry. In May 2018, he was inducted into the Wisconsin Meat Industry Hall of Fame. Elton D. Alberle is a college director. Aberle is recognized for his research on muscle growth and meat quality.

A report that Lynn Grooms made on September 10, 2020 talks more about what Elton D. Aberle has done now since his retirement. He still contributes to the community and to the university by supporting undergraduates and giving lectures and being a mentor to the undergraduates, at the university of UW College of agricultural and life science.

== Selected publication ==
- Principles of Meat Science, with John C. Forrest (2001)
