= Vitelline arteries =

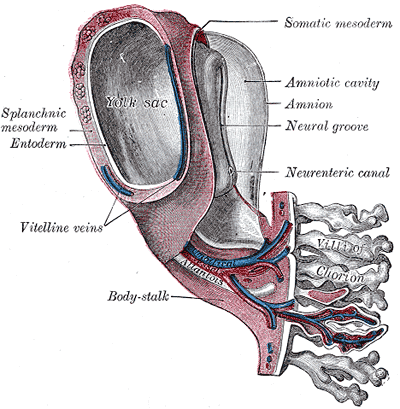
- Model of human embryo 1.3 mm. long. (Vitelline arteries not shown, but vitelline veins labeled at center left.)

Details
- Carnegie stage: 13
- Days: 28

Identifiers
- Latin: arteria vitellina

The vitelline arteries are the arterial counterpart to the vitelline veins. Like the veins, they play an important role in the vitelline circulation of blood to and from the yolk sac of a fetus. They are a branch of the dorsal aorta.

They give rise to the celiac artery, superior mesenteric artery, and inferior mesenteric artery.
