= Alton (surname) =

Alton (/ˈɔːltən/ AWL-tən, UK also /ˈɒltən/ OL-tən) is a surname. Notable people with the surname include:

- David Alton, Baron Alton of Liverpool (born 1951), British politician
- Ernest Alton (1873–1952), Irish professor and politician
- John Alton (1901–1996), American Academy Award-winning cinematographer
- Joseph W. Alton (1919–2013), American politician and state senator
- Lily Alton-Triggs, Australian rower
- Robert Alton (1906–1957), American dancer and choreographer
- Roger Alton (born 1947), British journalist and former editor of The Independent

== See also ==
- D'Alton
- Elton (name), given name and surname
