= Elton (footballer, born May 1985) =

Brazilian footballer

Personal information
- Full name: Elton Aparecido de Souza
- Date of birth: 9 May 1985 (age 41)
- Place of birth: Campinas, Brazil
- Height: 1.87 m (6 ft 2 in)
- Position: Striker

Youth career
- Ginásio Pinhalense
- 2005: Guaçuano

Senior career*
Years	Team	Apps	(Gls)
2005–2006	Atlético Sorocaba		
2006–2007	Pogoń Szczecin	34	(3)
2007–2008	Slavia Sofia	17	(3)
2010–2011	Belenenses	14	(0)
2012	Itapirense		
2013	Grêmio Osasco		
2014	Cianorte		
2014	Paranavaí		
- * Club domestic league appearances and goals

Elton Aparecido de Souza (born 9 May 1985), known simply as Elton, is a Brazilian former professional footballer who played as a striker.

== Club career ==
Elton began his career in his native Brazil, playing in the youth system of Ginásio Pinhalense before moving to Guaçuano in 2005. He made his senior debut with Atlético Sorocaba, where he spent the 2005–06 season.

Seeking opportunities in Europe, Elton transferred to Polish Ekstraklasa club Pogoń Szczecin on 7 March 2006. He was a regular starter for the Polish side, making 34 league appearances and scoring 3 goals during his time at the club.

Following his stint in Poland, he moved to the Bulgarian top flight ahead of the 2007–08 season to join Slavia Sofia. He made 17 league appearances for the capital club, scoring 3 goals.

In 2010, Elton relocated to Portugal, signing with Belenenses, who were competing in the Liga Portugal 2. He appeared in 14 matches for the Lisbon-based club without scoring.

After his European journey, Elton returned to Brazil in 2012 to play in the lower tiers and state championships. He had brief spells with Itapirense in 2012 and Grêmio Osasco in 2013, before concluding his career in 2014 with stints at Cianorte and Paranavaí in the Campeonato Paranaense.
