= Dorsal aorta =

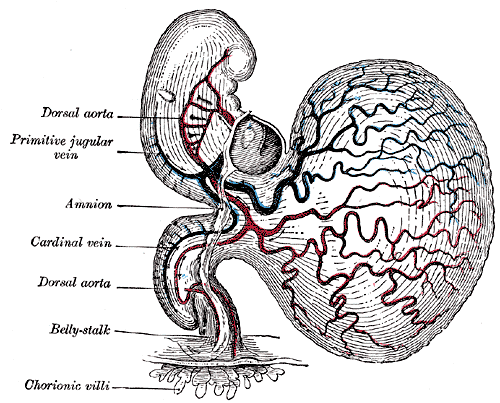
- Human embryo of about fourteen days, with yolk-sac. (Dorsal aorta labeled twice at left.)

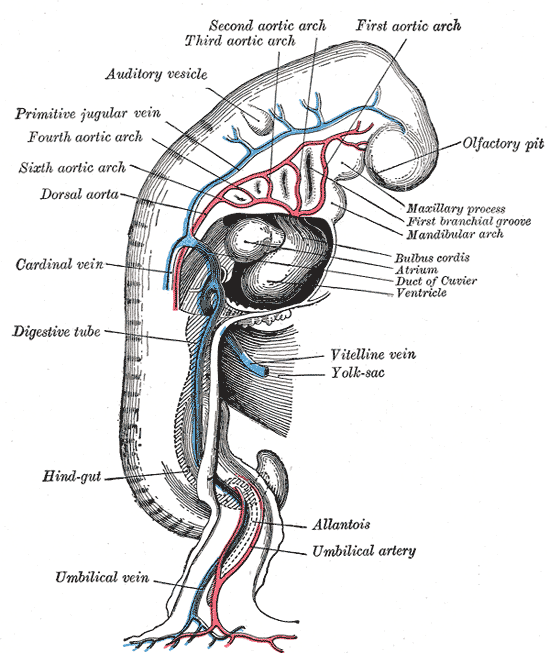
- Profile view of a human embryo estimated at twenty or twenty-one days old. (Dorsal aorta labeled at center left.)

Details
- Carnegie stage: 9
- Gives rise to: Descending aorta
- System: Circulatory system

Identifiers
- Latin: aorta dorsalis
- TE: aorta_by_E5.11.2.1.3.0.1 E5.11.2.1.3.0.1

The dorsal aortae are paired (left and right) embryological vessels which progress to form the descending aorta. The paired dorsal aortae arise from aortic arches that in turn arise from the aortic sac.

The primary dorsal aorta is located deep to the lateral plate of mesoderm and move from lateral to medial position with development and eventually will fuse with the other dorsal aorta to form the descending aorta.

Each primitive aorta anteriorly receives the vitelline vein from the yolk-sac, and is prolonged backward on the lateral aspect of the notochord under the name of the dorsal aorta.

The dorsal aortae give branches to the yolk-sac, and are continued backward through the body-stalk as the umbilical arteries to the villi of the chorion.
