= Vitelline veins =

Veins that drain blood from the yolk sac and gut tube

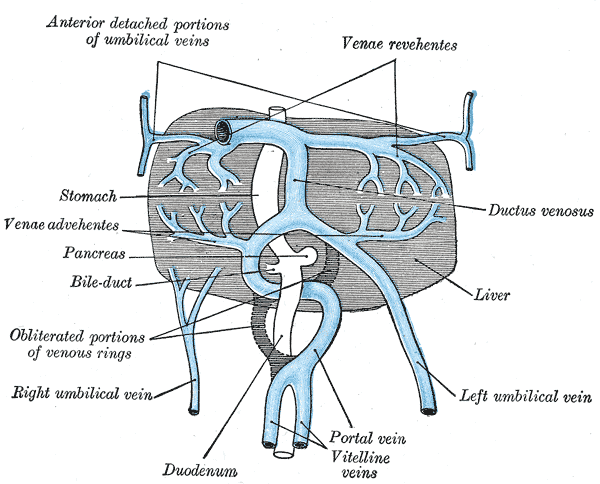
- The liver and the veins in connection with it, of a human embryo, twenty-four or twenty-five days old, as seen from the ventral surface. (Vitelline veins visible at center bottom.)

Details
- Carnegie stage: 9
- Days: 28

Identifiers
- Latin: vena vitellina
- FMA: 70305

The vitelline veins are veins that drain blood from the yolk sac and the gut tube during gestation.

== Path ==
They run upward at first in front, and subsequently on either side of the intestinal canal. They unite on the ventral aspect of the canal.

Beyond this, they are connected to one another by two anastomotic branches, one on the dorsal, and the other on the ventral aspect of the duodenal portion of the intestine. This is encircled by two venous rings; into the middle or dorsal anastomosis the superior mesenteric vein opens.

The portions of the veins above the upper ring become interrupted by the developing liver and broken up by it into a plexus of small capillary-like vessels termed sinusoids.

== Derivatives ==
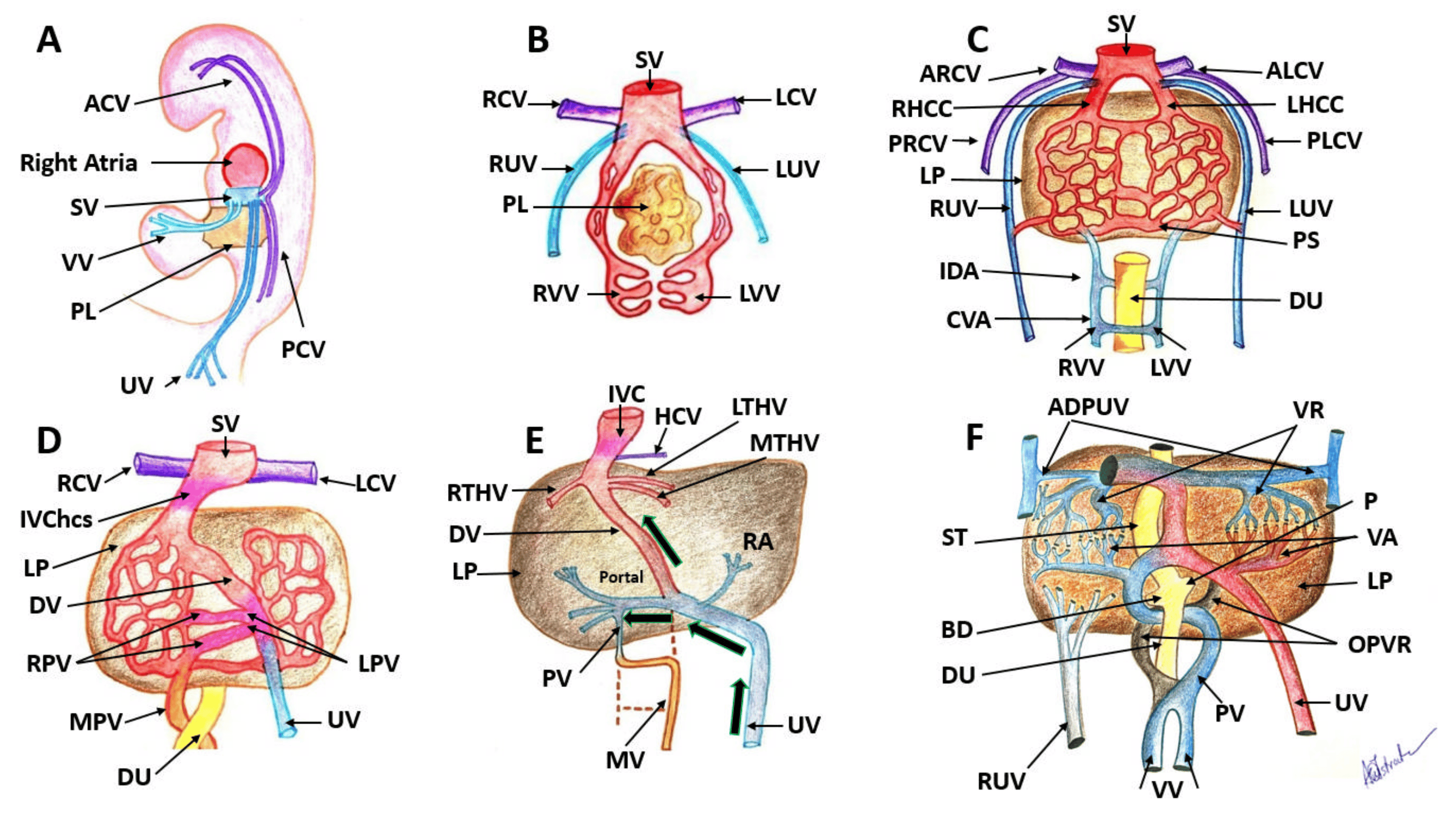
Illustration of early development of veins and portal venous system. VV Vitelline veins, UV Umbilical veins, CV Cardinal veins, SV Sinus venosus

The vitelline veins give rise to:

- Hepatic veins
- Inferior portion of Inferior vena cava
- Portal vein
- Superior mesenteric vein
- Inferior mesenteric vein

The branches conveying the blood to the plexus are named the venae advehentes, and become the branches of the portal vein. The vessels draining the plexus into the sinus venosus are termed the venae revehentes, and form the future hepatic veins. Ultimately the left vena revehens no longer communicates directly with the sinus venosus, but opens into the right vena revehens. The persistent part of the upper venous ring, above the opening of the superior mesenteric vein, forms the trunk of the portal vein.

== Function ==
The vitelline veins drain the yolk sac during early embryonic development. They also drain the gut tube in embryos once this has formed from the yolk sac.

== Additional images ==
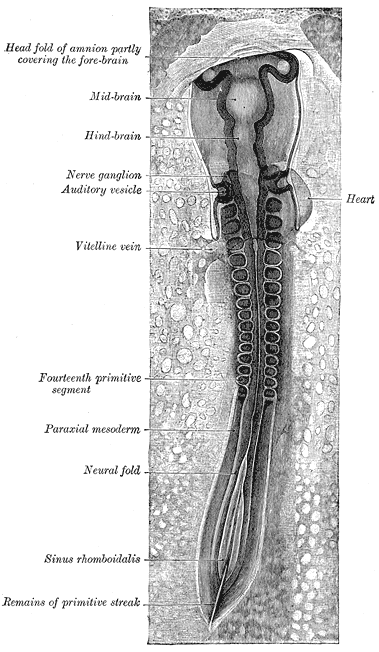
Chick embryo of thirty-three hours’ incubation, viewed from the dorsal aspect. X 30.

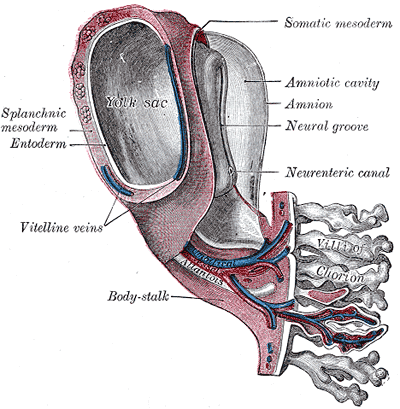
Model of human embryo 1.3 mm. long.

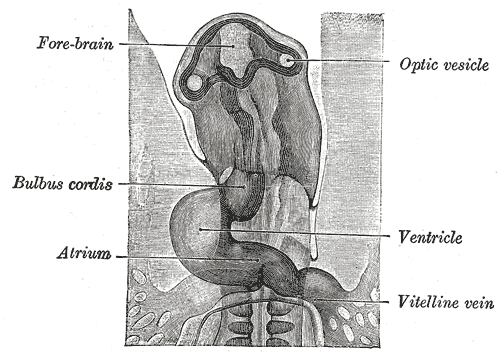
Head of chick embryo of about thirty-eight hours’ incubation, viewed from the ventral surface. X 26.

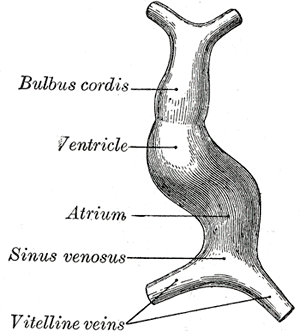
Diagram to illustrate the simple tubular condition of the heart.

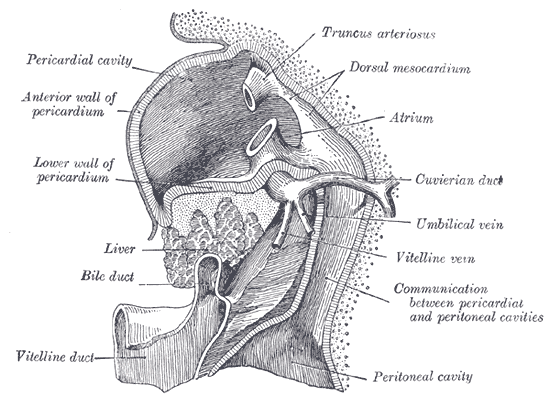
Liver with the septum transversum. Human embryo 3 mm. long.
