= Soluble fms-like tyrosine kinase-1 =

Protein with antiangiogenic properties

Soluble fms-like tyrosine kinase-1 (sFlt-1 or sVEGFR-1) is a tyrosine kinase protein with antiangiogenic properties. A non-membrane associated splice variant of VEGF receptor 1 (Flt-1), sFlt-1 binds the angiogenic factors VEGF (vascular endothelial growth factor) and PlGF (placental growth factor), reducing blood vessel growth through reduction of free VEGF and PlGF concentrations. In humans, sFlt-1 is important in the regulation of blood vessel formation in diverse tissues, including the kidneys, cornea, and uterus. Abnormally high levels of sFlt-1 have been implicated in the pathogenesis of preeclampsia.

== Structure ==
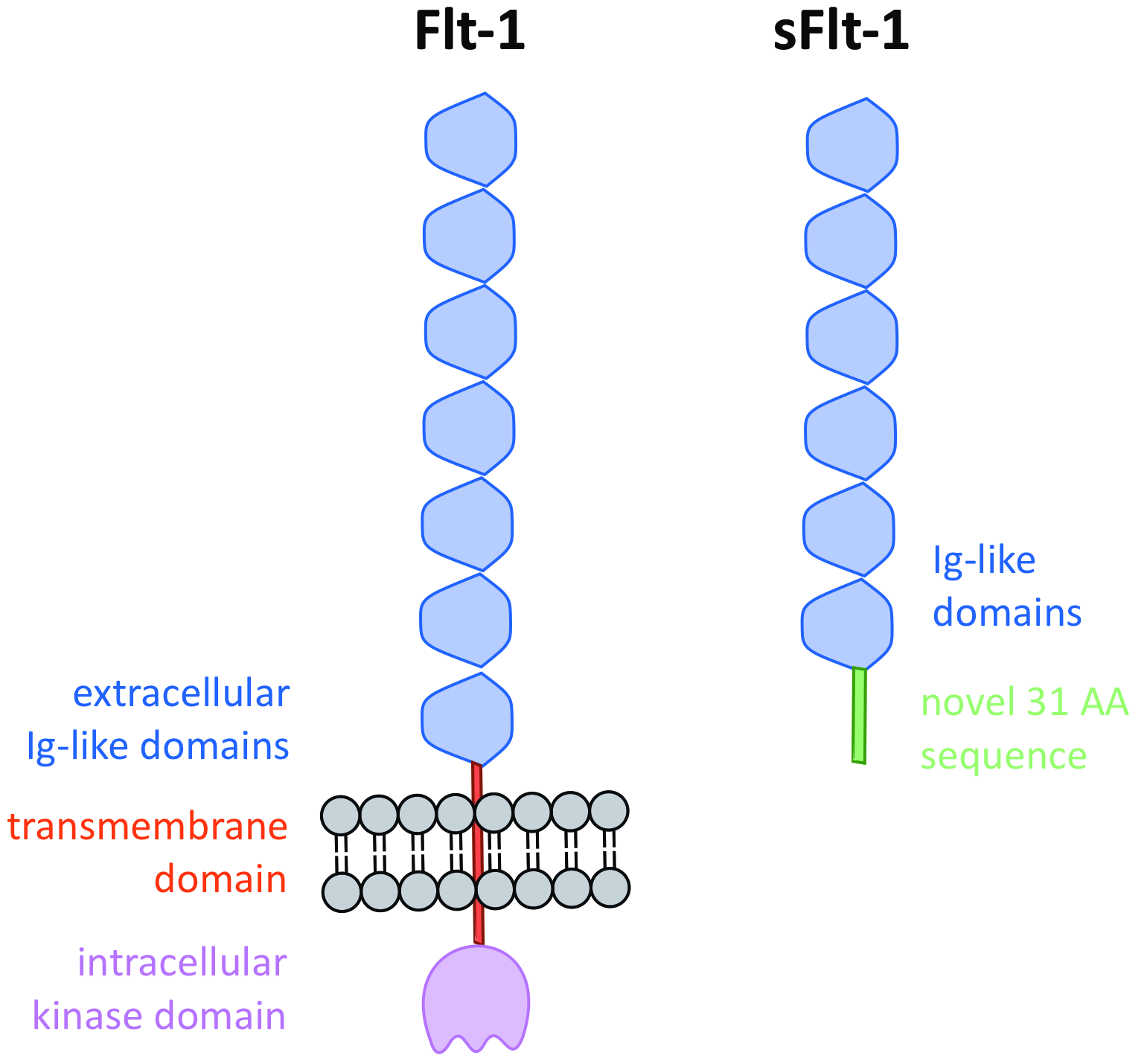
Structural comparison of sFlt-1 and Flt-1.

sFlt-1 is a truncated form of the VEGF receptor Flt-1. Though sFlt-1 contains an extracellular domain identical to that of Flt-1, it lacks both the transmembrane and intercellular domains present in Flt-1. Instead, sFlt-1 contains a novel 31 amino acid C-terminal sequence. sFlt-1 is composed of 6 immunoglobulin-like domains, with a binding site for VEGF and PIGF within the second domain from the N-terminus. A sequence of 10 basic amino acids form a binding site for the anticoagulant heparin in the third domain from the N-terminus. sFlt-1 has a pI of 9.51, giving the protein a positive charge at physiological pH.

== Biological function ==
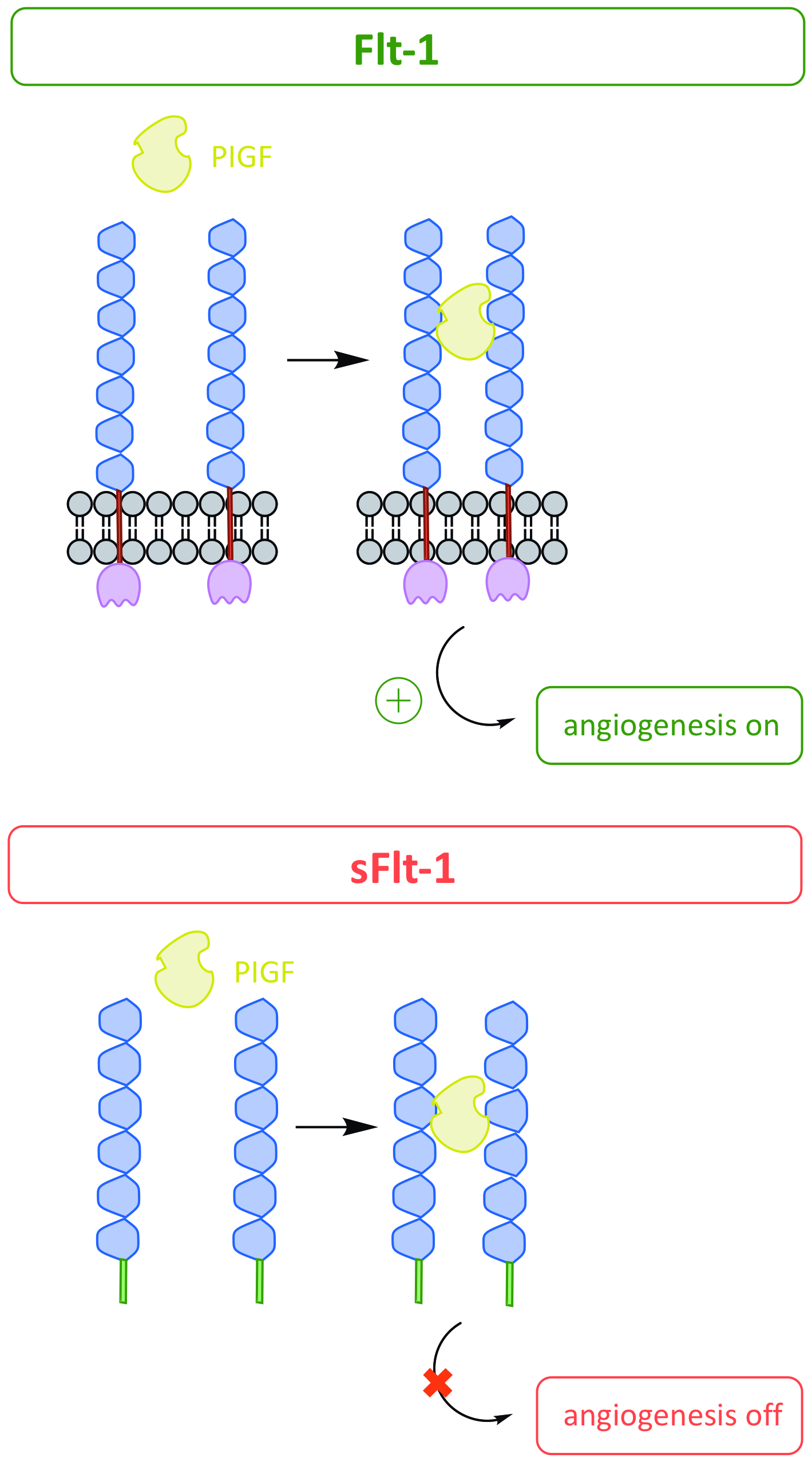
Comparison of mechanism of action of sFlt-1 and Flt-1.

Because sFlt-1 lacks the transmembrane domain that typically embeds tyrosine kinase receptors in the cell membrane, sFlt-1 travels freely in the blood circulation, and thus can travel from the tissue in which it is originally secreted to other areas of the body. As it contains the same extracellular domain as Flt-1, sFlt-1 competes with Flt-1 to bind VEGF and PIGF, effectively reducing serum concentrations of these two angiogenic growth factors. Though sFlt-1 can effectively dimerize, its lack of a kinase domain means that no tyrosine phosphorylation occurs upon ligand binding. As a result, sFlt-1 effectively sequesters agonists of Flt-1, and has been implicated as a regulator of this receptor in the kidney, liver, and brain.

== Role in preeclampsia ==
=== The placental factor theory of preeclampsia ===
Preeclampsia is a pregnancy-specific condition characterized by maternal hypertension and proteinuria after the 20th week of gestation. Normally, during early formation of the placenta, extravillous cytotrophoblasts, a type of specialized fetal cell, enter the spiral arteries of the uterus. This invasion spurs remodeling of the epithelial layer of these uterine arteries, increasing their conductance and decreasing their resistance to meet the increase blood flow demands of pregnancy. Specifically, invading cytotrophoblasts achieve this change by down-regulating the expression of adhesion molecules characteristic of epithelial cells and up-regulating the expression of adhesion molecules characteristic of endothelial cells in a process known as pseudovasculogenesis.

In preeclamptic patients, this arterial transformation is incomplete, as cytotrophoblasts fail to completely switch their adhesion molecule expression pattern to an endothelial form. The balance of pro- and anti-angiogenic factors and their receptors, including VEGF-A, PIGF, Flt1, and sFlt1, is thought to mediate this process.

In women who develop preeclampsia, the sFlt-1 to PlGF ratio is higher than in normal pregnancy. sFlt-1 produced in the placenta is thought to circulate in the maternal bloodstream to act on distant tissues, explaining the multi-system endothelial dysfunction observed in women with preeclampsia. In-vitro studies have linked sFlt-1 treatment to a pattern of vasoconstriction and endothelial dysfunction identical to the syndrome produced when cells are incubated with serum from preeclamptic patients. Additionally, adenoviral transfer of the sFlt-1 gene to pregnant rats has been shown to produce a syndrome similar to preeclampsia.

=== Preeclamptic regulation of sFlt-1 ===
Though sFlt-1 is produced in small amounts by endothelial cells and monocytes, the placenta is theorized to be the major source of sFlt-1 during pregnancy. sFlt-1 mRNA shows strong expression in the placenta, and serum concentration of sFlt-1 falls significantly in patients after delivery of the placenta.

Expression of sFlt-1 is stimulated by hypoxic conditions. In healthy pregnancies, the placenta develops in a hypoxic environment, leading to a 20-fold increase in sFlt-1 expression. In early-onset preeclamptic patients, this increase is estimated to be up to 43 times more pronounced, and may be spurred by conditions of poor uterine profusion leading to more severe local hypoxia. Inhibition of nitric oxide signaling has also been associated with elevation of serum sFlt-1 in a rat model of preeclampsia; this stimulus may represent a secondary factor contributing to sFlt-1 trends in human preeclampsia as well.

In addition to short-term regulation by oxygen and nitric oxide levels, genetic differences also influence Flt-1 gene splicing and resulting sFlt-1 expression levels. Women with histories of preeclampsia continue to show elevated serum levels of sFlt-1 up to 18 months postpartum, suggesting a genetic basis of sFlt-1 expression independent of pregnancy-related stimuli.

=== Clinical significance ===
PlGF and sFlt-1 concentrations measured by immunoassay in maternal blood improve the prognostic possibilities in preeclampsia, which is typically diagnosed solely on the basis of clinical symptoms, proteinuria, and uterine artery Doppler velocimetry. Notably, increases in sFlt-1 and decreases in PIGF and VEGF can be detected at least five weeks before the onset of preeclamptic symptoms, potentially facilitating earlier diagnosis and treatment. sFlt-1 changes are most predictive of early-onset preeclampsia; cases of preeclampsia incident late in pregnancy typically are accompanied only by small decreases in PIGF. However, sFlt-1 elevation is also associated with other obstetric conditions such as non-preeclampsic interuterine growth retardation of the fetus, limiting its use as a discriminatory biomarker for preeclampsia. Additionally, sensitivity and specificity of sFlt-1 testing is generally considered too low to enable it to serve as an effective predictor of preeclampsia.

sFlt-1 involvement in the pathogenesis of preeclampsia may explain several demographic trends in incidence of the condition. The human Flt-1/sFlt-1 gene is located at 13q12; the association of fetal trisomy-13 with higher rates of preeclampsia could theoretically be explained by the additional copy of the gene. Additionally, primiparous women have higher baseline levels of sFlt-1, a trend which could potentially explain the higher incidence of preeclampsia among first-time mothers.
