= Placental growth factor =

Protein-coding gene in the species Homo sapiens

PGF
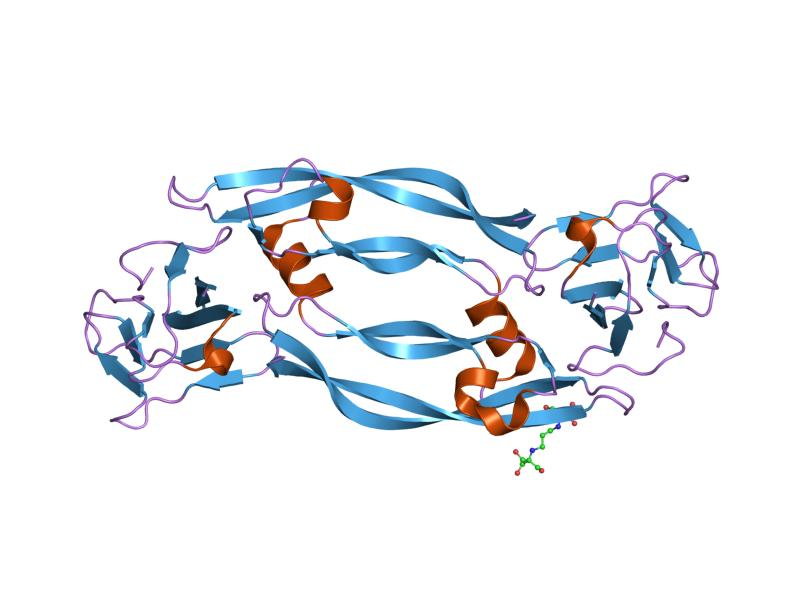

Identifiers
- Aliases: PGF, D12S1900, PGFL, PLGF, PlGF-2, SHGC-10760, Placental growth factor, PIGF
- External IDs: OMIM: 601121; MGI: 105095; GeneCards: PGF
Available structures
PDB	Ortholog search: PDBe RCSB
PDB	List of PDB id codes 1FZV, 1RV6

Gene location (Human)
Chr.	Chromosome 14 (human)
Band	14q24.3	Start	74,941,834 bp
Band	14q24.3	End	74,955,626 bp

Gene location (Mouse)
Chr.	Chromosome 12 (mouse)
Band	12 D1|12 39.58 cM	Start	85,213,409 bp
Band	12 D1|12 39.58 cM	End	85,224,564 bp
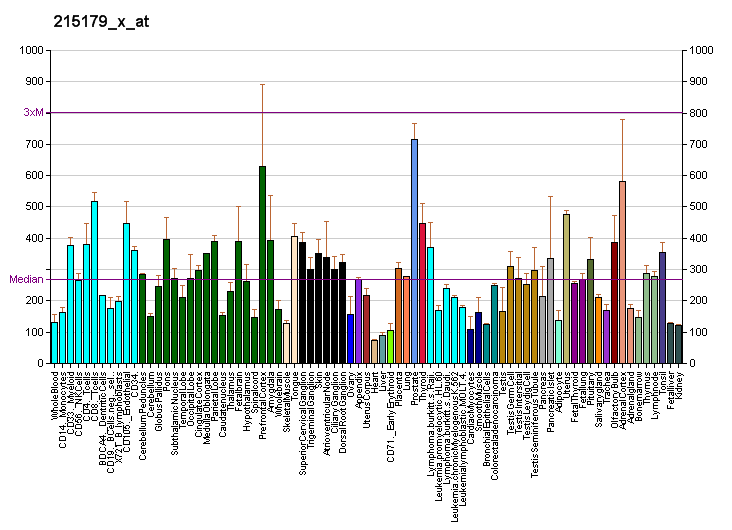

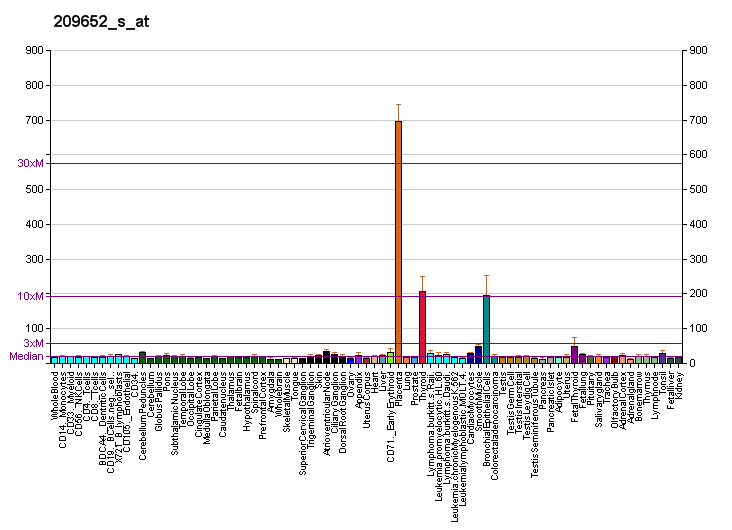
RNA expression pattern
Bgee	Human / Mouse (ortholog); Top expressed in: renal medulla; cardia; pylorus; nipple; ventral tegmental area; trigeminal ganglion; inferior ganglion of vagus nerve; external globus pallidus; superior surface of tongue; pars reticulata / Top expressed in: decidua; external carotid artery; ankle joint; internal carotid artery; facial motor nucleus; embryo; saccule; lens; Smooth muscle tissue of renal pelvis; islet of Langerhans; More reference expression data
BioGPS	More reference expression data
Gene ontology
Molecular function	heparin binding; protein homodimerization activity; protein binding; protein heterodimerization activity; growth factor activity; vascular endothelial growth factor receptor binding; chemoattractant activity; vascular endothelial growth factor receptor 3 binding
Cellular component	membrane; extracellular region; extracellular space
Biological process	cell differentiation; female pregnancy; cell-cell signaling; regulation of morphogenesis of a branching structure; sprouting angiogenesis; multicellular organism development; branching involved in ureteric bud morphogenesis; cellular response to hormone stimulus; animal organ regeneration; positive regulation of cell population proliferation; positive regulation of cell division; signal transduction; angiogenesis; response to hypoxia; positive regulation of endothelial cell proliferation; positive regulation of angiogenesis; vascular endothelial growth factor receptor signaling pathway; induction of positive chemotaxis; positive regulation of mast cell chemotaxis; regulation of signaling receptor activity; positive regulation of protein phosphorylation; vascular endothelial growth factor signaling pathway; positive chemotaxis
Sources:Amigo / QuickGO
Orthologs
Databases	NCBI: entry; OMA: entry
Species	Human	Mouse
Entrez	5228	18654
Ensembl	ENSG00000119630	ENSMUSG00000004791
UniProt	P49763	P49764
RefSeq (mRNA)	NM_002632; NM_001207012; NM_001293643	NM_001271705; NM_008827
RefSeq (protein)	NP_001193941; NP_001280572; NP_002623	NP_001258634; NP_032853
Location (UCSC)	Chr 14: 74.94 – 74.96 Mb	Chr 12: 85.21 – 85.22 Mb
PubMed search
- Wikidata
View/Edit Human	View/Edit Mouse

Placental growth factor (PlGF) is a protein that in humans is encoded by the PGF gene.

Placental growth factor is a member of the VEGF (vascular endothelial growth factor) sub-family - a key molecule in angiogenesis and vasculogenesis, in particular during embryogenesis. The main source of PlGF during pregnancy is the placental trophoblast. PGF is also expressed in many other tissues, including the villous trophoblast.

The placental growth factor gene (PGF) is a protein-coding gene and a member of the vascular endothelial growth factor (VEGF) family. PGF is expressed only in human umbilical vein endothelial cells, and the placenta. PGF is ultimately associated with angiogenesis. Specifically, PGF plays a role in trophoblast growth and differentiation. Trophoblast cells, specifically extravillous trophoblast cells, are responsible for invading the uterine wall and the maternal spiral arteries. The extravillous trophoblast cells produce a blood vessel of larger diameter for the developing fetus that is independent of maternal vasoconstriction. This is essential for increased blood flow and reduced resistance. Proper development of blood vessels in the placenta is crucial for the higher blood requirement of the fetus later in pregnancy. Under normal physiologic conditions, PGF is also expressed at a low level in other organs including the heart, lung, thyroid, and skeletal muscle.

== Isoform tissue specificity ==
There are three isoforms of this protein: PGF-1, PGF-2, PGF-3. PGF-1 is specifically found in the colon as well as mammary carcinomas, while PGF-2 is only found in early placenta up until the 8th week of development. PGF-2 is the only isoform able to bind to heparin. PGF-3 is found mainly in placental tissues.

== Clinical significance ==
Placental growth factor-expression within human atherosclerotic lesions is associated with plaque inflammation and neovascular growth.

Serum levels of PGF and sFlt-1 (soluble fms-like tyrosine kinase-1, also known as soluble VEGF receptor-1) are altered in women with preeclampsia. Studies show that in both early and late onset preeclampsia, maternal serum levels of sFlt-1 are higher and PGF lower in women presenting with preeclampsia. In addition, placental sFlt-1 levels were significantly increased and PGF decreased in women with preeclampsia as compared to those with uncomplicated pregnancies. This suggests that placental concentrations of sFlt-1 and PGF mirror the maternal serum changes. This is consistent with the view that the placenta is the main source of sFlt-1 and PGF during pregnancy.^{1}

PGF is a potential biomarker for preeclampsia, a condition in which blood vessels in the placenta are too narrow, resulting in high blood pressure. As mentioned before, extravillous trophoblast cells invade maternal arteries. Improper differentiation may result in hypo-invasion of these arteries and thus failure to widen enough. Studies have found low levels of PGF in women who were diagnosed with preeclampsia later in their pregnancy.

== Associated diseases ==
Placental insufficiency, otherwise known as uteroplacental vascular insufficiency, results from insufficient blood supply to the placenta. This disease is characterized by an alteration in the PGF gene and its GPCR and ERK signaling pathways. Alterations in the PGF and the PGF receptor mRNA expression prevent the normal development of placental vasculature.

Twin-to-twin transfusion syndrome is another disease associated with the PGF gene. This is a rare disease occurring primarily in identical twins where blood from one twin is transferred to the other. Typically, the twin whose blood is being transferred is born smaller and with anemia while the other twin is born larger with too much blood and at increased risk for heart failure. The PGF gene pathways primarily affected are the TGF-Beta pathway and AKT signaling pathway.
