= RIPOR2 =

Protein-coding gene in humans

Identifiers
- Aliases: RIPOR2, C6orf32, DIFF40, DIFF48, MYONAP, PL48, FAM65B, DFNB104, family with sequence similarity 65 member B, RHO family interacting cell polarization regulator 2, DFNA21
- External IDs: OMIM: 611410; MGI: 2444879; GeneCards: RIPOR2

Gene location (Human)
Chr.	Chromosome 6 (human)
Band	6p22.3	Start	24,804,282 bp
Band	6p22.3	End	25,042,170 bp

Gene location (Mouse)
Chr.	Chromosome 13 (mouse)
Band	13|13 A3.1	Start	24,685,508 bp
Band	13|13 A3.1	End	24,917,799 bp
RNA expression pattern
Bgee	Human / Mouse (ortholog); Top expressed in: blood; monocyte; granulocyte; bronchial epithelial cell; spleen; appendix; lymph node; bone marrow cell; epithelium of nasopharynx; body of uterus / Top expressed in: lateral septal nucleus; granulocyte; subiculum; lymph node; nucleus accumbens; spleen; mesenteric lymph nodes; blood; medial dorsal nucleus; Region I of hippocampus proper; More reference expression data
BioGPS	n/a
Gene ontology
Molecular function	protein binding; 14-3-3 protein binding; identical protein binding
Cellular component	plasma membrane; cell projection; membrane; cytoplasm; apical plasma membrane; cytoskeleton; filopodium; stereocilium; stereocilium membrane
Biological process	multicellular organism development; cell differentiation; muscle organ development; hearing; skeletal muscle fiber development; positive regulation of myoblast differentiation; positive regulation of myoblast fusion; negative regulation of establishment of T cell polarity; negative regulation of T cell migration; negative regulation of T cell proliferation; regulation of mitotic spindle assembly; chemotaxis; cell adhesion; negative regulation of signal transduction; negative regulation of cell adhesion; negative regulation of Rho protein signal transduction; positive regulation of filopodium assembly; positive regulation of neutrophil chemotaxis; negative regulation of protein localization to cell leading edge; cellular response to chemokine; regulation of establishment of cell polarity; positive regulation of neutrophil extravasation; negative regulation of Rho guanyl-nucleotide exchange factor activity; establishment of protein localization; protein homooligomerization; auditory receptor cell stereocilium organization; cellular response to mechanical stimulus
Sources:Amigo / QuickGO
Orthologs
Databases	NCBI: entry; OMA: entry
Species	Human	Mouse
Entrez	9750	193385
Ensembl	ENSG00000111913	ENSMUSG00000036006
UniProt	Q9Y4F9	Q80U16
RefSeq (mRNA)	NM_001286445; NM_001286446; NM_001286447; NM_014722; NM_015864 NM_001346031; NM_001346032	NM_001080381; NM_001286100; NM_001286101; NM_029679; NM_178658
RefSeq (protein)	NP_001273374; NP_001273375; NP_001273376; NP_001332960; NP_001332961 NP_055537; NP_056948	NP_001073850; NP_001273029; NP_001273030; NP_083955; NP_848773 NP_001389841; NP_001389842; NP_001389843; NP_001389844; NP_001389845; NP_001389846; NP_001389847; NP_001389848
Location (UCSC)	Chr 6: 24.8 – 25.04 Mb	Chr 13: 24.69 – 24.92 Mb
PubMed search
- Wikidata
View/Edit Human	View/Edit Mouse

RHO family interacting cell polarization regulator 2 is a protein that in humans is encoded by the RIPOR2 gene.

== Function ==
The protein encoded by this gene stimulates the formation of a non-mitotic multinucleate syncytium from proliferative cytotrophoblasts during trophoblast differentiation. Alternative splicing of this gene results in multiple transcript variants. [provided by RefSeq, Nov 2013].

== Clinical significance ==
Mutations in RIPOR2 are associated to hearing loss.
