= Extravillous trophoblast =

Cell type

Extravillous trophoblasts (EVTs), are one form of differentiated trophoblast cells of the placenta. They are invasive mesenchymal cells which function to establish critical tissue connection in the developing placental-uterine interface. EVTs derive from progenitor cytotrophoblasts (CYTs), as does the other main trophoblast subtype, syncytiotrophoblast (SYN). They are sometimes called intermediate trophoblast.

EVTs that derive from CYT cells on the surface of placental chorionic villi that come into contact with the uterine wall - at the placental bed - begin to express the HLA-G antigen. Extravillous trophoblast (EVT) cells migrate from anchoring villi, and invade into the decidua basalis. Their main function is remodelling the uterine spiral arteries, to achieve an increase in the spiral artery diameter of from four to six times. This changes them from high-resistance low-flow vessels into large dilated vessels that provide good perfusion, and oxygenation to the developing placenta. When invasion is shallow it is inadequate, the arteries remain narrow at their openings into the intervillous space, and is the cause of pre-eclampsia, fetal growth restriction and still birth.

EVT are a low-incidence (<5% of trophoblasts), but critical and multifunctional, subtype of trophoblast in the placenta.

== Function ==
As the placenta forms and the cytotrophoblast layer grows and extends, distal villous CYT differentiate to cell column CYT which eventually detach and invade deeply to the maternal decidua as interstitial EVTs. These EVTs anchor placental villi to the maternal decidua. Shallow implantation of EVT is associated with poor placentation and preeclampsia. Endovascular EVTs are also major regulators of oxygenation during early placental development. Initially, they plug maternal spiral arteries to maintain hypoxia and prevent blood perfusion. This protects the fetus and placenta from oxidative stress during early development in the histiotrophic (glandular nutrition) stage. As fetal nutrition switches to the hemotrophic (blood-derived nutrition) stage, EVT plugs dissolve and perfusion of maternal blood begins, allowing further development of both the fetus and placenta.

== Formation ==
Cells that will eventually become extraembryonic placental trophoblasts are derived from the trophectoderm. As the trophectoderm separates from the inner cell mass during blastulation, early trophoblasts begin to form the placenta. Later in placental development, both interstitial and endovascular EVTs form as underlying progenitor cell column CYTs undergo epithelial to mesenchymal transition (EMT). This cellular process continually occurs as the CYT layer replenishes extravillous trophoblasts. EMT of CYT to EVT in the placenta is strongly controlled by the transcription factor T-cell factor 4 (TCF4) which is Wnt-dependent. Canonical Wnt signaling pathways have many downstream development-related transcription factor gene targets, including TCF4. Since developing placental trophoblasts do not necessarily follow canonical EMT, it has been suggested that a placental trophoblast-specific hybrid EMT is a separate iteration.

== Biological markers ==
Placental trophoblast subtypes can be distinguished by certain markers that are exclusive to each subtype. Transition from epithelial CYT to mesenchymal EVT can be tracked by a loss of E-cadherin and gain of N-cadherin. EVTs can also be distinguished by expression of human leukocyte antigen G (HLA-G), which is not expressed by other placental trophoblasts. As other trophoblast subtypes in the placental are epithelial, mesenchymal markers like vimentin and fibronectin can also be used for identification. These markers, however, are not specific to EVT and can also stain stromal cells in the placenta. As trophoblasts develop, they express different integrins. Whereas CYT can be identified by ITGA6, EVTs strongly express ITGA5. The existing in vitro EVT models detailed below recapitulate these markers and staining to varying degrees of accuracy.

== In vitro models ==
As EVTs are a critical cellular subtype of the placenta and their dysfunction is associated with a myriad of gestational illnesses, they are an attractive topic for research. Acquisition of this primary cell type from sensitive tissues can be difficult and inconsistent. First and second trimester placental tissue must usually be obtained from elective abortions, a designation requiring more NIH documentation and oversight. Tissue from term placentas is more readily available but cannot be used to address questions related to early development and dynamics. Dissociation of trophoblasts from other cell types in placental tissue can be procedurally difficult and pure trophoblast subtype populations take great lengths to obtain. Then, the resulting primary trophoblast cells can then only be kept in culture for a few days. Thus, there is a high demand for accurate cell lines to model primary placental trophoblasts. The immortalized cell line HTR-8/SVneo is commonly used to model EVTs. Newer multipotent trophoblast stem cell systems can be induced to differentiate into HLA-G+ EVT from CYT. Systems of placental organoids can also grow invasive EVT when cultured in Matrigel. Each of these options varies in their utility and accuracy to primary EVTs. As research groups continue to develop better techniques of recapitulating primary cells in vitro, proper modeling of placental EVTs remains a goal of the field.
