= Pre-eclampsia =

Hypertension occurring during pregnancy

- Other names: Preeclampsia toxaemia (PET)
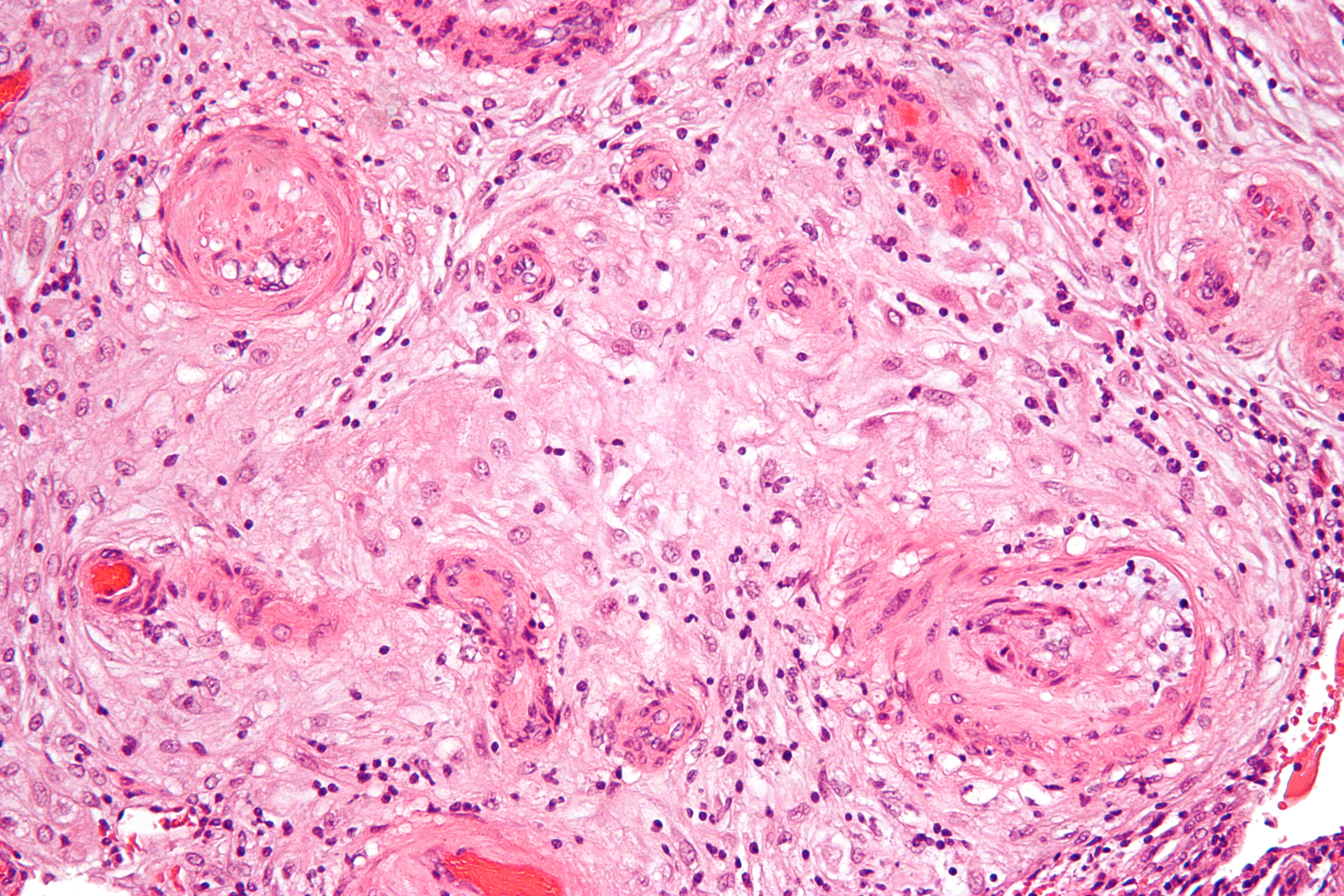
- A micrograph showing hypertrophic decidual vasculopathy, a finding seen in gestational hypertension and pre-eclampsia. H&E stain.
- Specialty: Obstetrics, emergency medicine
- Symptoms: High blood pressure, protein in the urine
- Complications: Red blood cell breakdown, low blood platelet count, impaired liver function, kidney problems, swelling, shortness of breath due to fluid in the lungs, eclampsia
- Usual onset: After 20 weeks of pregnancy
- Risk factors: Obesity, prior hypertension, older age, diabetes mellitus
- Diagnostic method: BP > 140 mmHg systolic or 90 mmHg diastolic at two separate times
- Prevention: Aspirin, calcium supplementation, treatment of prior hypertension
- Treatment: Delivery, medications
- Medication: Labetalol, methyldopa, magnesium sulfate
- Frequency: 2–8% of pregnancies
- Deaths: 46,900 hypertensive disorders in pregnancy (2015)

Pre-eclampsia (also spelt preeclampsia in American English) is a multi-system disorder specific to pregnancy, characterized by the new onset of high blood pressure and often a significant amount of protein in the urine (proteinuria) or by the new onset of high blood pressure along with significant end-organ damage, with or without the proteinuria. When it arises, the condition begins after 20 weeks of pregnancy. In severe cases of the disease there may be red blood cell breakdown, a low blood platelet count, impaired liver function, kidney dysfunction, swelling, shortness of breath due to fluid in the lungs, or visual disturbances. Pre-eclampsia increases the risk of undesirable as well as lethal outcomes for both the mother and the fetus including preterm labor. If left untreated, it may result in seizures at which point it is known as eclampsia.

Risk factors for pre-eclampsia include obesity, prior hypertension, older age, and diabetes mellitus. It is also more frequent in a woman's first pregnancy and if she is carrying twins. The underlying mechanisms are complex and involve abnormal formation of blood vessels in the placenta amongst other factors. Most cases are diagnosed before delivery, and may be categorized depending on the gestational week at delivery. Commonly, pre-eclampsia continues into the period after delivery, then known as postpartum pre-eclampsia. Rarely, pre-eclampsia may begin in the period after delivery. While historically both high blood pressure and protein in the urine were required to make the diagnosis, some definitions also include those with hypertension and any associated organ dysfunction. Blood pressure is defined as high when it is greater than 140 mmHg systolic or 90 mmHg diastolic at two separate times, more than four hours apart in a woman after twenty weeks of pregnancy. Pre-eclampsia is routinely screened during prenatal care.

Recommendations for prevention include: aspirin in those at high risk, calcium supplementation in areas with low intake, and treatment of prior hypertension with medications. In those with pre-eclampsia, delivery of the baby and placenta is an effective treatment but full recovery can take days or weeks. The point at which delivery becomes recommended depends on how severe the pre-eclampsia is and how far along in pregnancy a woman is. Blood pressure medication, such as labetalol and methyldopa, may be used to improve the mother's condition before delivery. Magnesium sulfate may be used to prevent eclampsia in those with severe disease. Bed rest and dietary salt restriction are not useful for either treatment or prevention.

Pre-eclampsia affects 2–8% of pregnancies worldwide. Hypertensive disorders of pregnancy (which include pre-eclampsia) are one of the most common causes of death due to pregnancy. They resulted in 46,900 deaths in 2015. Pre-eclampsia usually occurs after 32 weeks; however, if it occurs earlier it is associated with worse outcomes. Women who have had pre-eclampsia are at increased risk of high blood pressure, heart disease, and stroke later in life. Further, those with pre-eclampsia may have a lower risk of breast cancer.

== Etymology ==
The word "eclampsia" is from the Greek term ἔκλᾰμψῐς (éklămpsĭs, "sudden development, violent onset", literally "brightness"). The first known description of the condition was by Hippocrates in the 5th century BC.

An outdated medical term for pre-eclampsia is toxemia of pregnancy, a term that originated in the mistaken belief that the condition was caused by toxins.

== Signs and symptoms ==
Symptoms of preeclampsia

Edema (especially in the hands and face) was originally considered an important sign for a diagnosis of pre-eclampsia. However, because edema is a common occurrence in pregnancy, its utility as a distinguishing factor in pre-eclampsia is not high. Pitting edema (unusual swelling, particularly of the hands, feet, or face, notable by leaving an indentation when pressed on) can be significant and should be reported to a healthcare provider.

Further, a symptom such as epigastric pain may be misinterpreted as heartburn. Standard features of pre-eclampsia, which are screened for during prenatal visits, include elevated blood pressure and excess protein in the urine. Additionally, some women may develop severe headaches as a sign of pre-eclampsia. In general, none of the signs of pre-eclampsia are specific, and even convulsions in pregnancy are more likely to have causes other than eclampsia in modern practice. Diagnosis depends on finding a coincidence of several pre-eclamptic features, the final proof being their regression within the days and weeks after delivery.

== Causes ==
The cause of preeclampsia is not fully understood. It is likely related to factors such as:

- Abnormal placentation (formation and development of the placenta)
- Immunologic factors
- Prior or existing maternal pathology – pre-eclampsia is seen more at a higher incidence in individuals with pre-existing hypertension, obesity, or antiphospholipid antibody syndrome, or those with a history of pre-eclampsia
- Dietary factors, e.g., calcium supplementation in areas where dietary calcium intake is low, have been shown to reduce the risk of pre-eclampsia
- Environmental factors, e.g., air pollution
- Infection (for which there is much evidence), including at the time of conception.

Those with long-term high blood pressure have a 7 to 8 times higher risk than those without.

Physiologically, research has linked pre-eclampsia to the following physiologic changes: alterations in the interaction between the maternal immune response and the placenta, placental injury, endothelial cell injury, altered vascular reactivity, oxidative stress, imbalance among vasoactive substances, decreased intravascular volume, and disseminated intravascular coagulation.

While the exact cause of pre-eclampsia remains unclear, there is strong evidence that a major cause predisposing a susceptible woman to pre-eclampsia is an abnormally implanted placenta. This abnormally implanted placenta may result in poor uterine and placental perfusion, yielding a state of hypoxia and increased oxidative stress and the release of anti-angiogenic proteins along with inflammatory mediators into the maternal plasma. A major consequence of this sequence of events is generalized endothelial dysfunction. The abnormal implantation may stem from the maternal immune system's response to the placenta, specifically a lack of established immunological tolerance in pregnancy. Endothelial dysfunction results in hypertension and many of the other symptoms and complications associated with pre-eclampsia. When pre-eclampsia develops in the last weeks of pregnancy or a multiple pregnancy, the causation may, in some cases, partly be due to a large placenta outgrowing the capacity of the uterus, eventually leading to the symptoms of pre-eclampsia.

Abnormal chromosome 19 microRNA cluster (C19MC) impairs extravillus trophoblast cell invasion to the spiral arteries, causing high resistance, low blood flow, and low nutrient supply to the fetus.

=== Genetic factors ===
Despite a lack of knowledge of the specific causal mechanisms of pre-eclampsia, strong evidence suggests it results from both environmental and heritable factors. A 2005 study showed that women with a first-degree relative who had a pre-eclamptic birth are twice as likely to develop it themselves. Furthermore, men related to someone with an affected birth have an increased risk of fathering a pre-eclamptic pregnancy. Fetuses affected by pre-eclampsia have a higher chance of later pregnancy complications including growth restriction, prematurity, and stillbirth.

The onset of pre-eclampsia is thought to be caused by several complex interactions between genetics and environmental factors. Our current understanding of the specifically heritable cause involves an imbalance of angiogenic factors in the placenta. Angiogenesis involves the growth of new blood vessels from existing vessels. An imbalance during pregnancy can affect the vascularization, growth, and biological function of the fetus. The irregular expression of these factors is thought to be controlled by multiple loci on different chromosomes. Research on the topic has been limited because of the heterogeneous nature of the disease. Maternal, paternal, and fetal genotypes play a role, as do complex epigenetic factors such as whether the parents smoke, maternal age, sexual cohabitation, and obesity. There is very little understanding of the mechanisms of these interactions. Due to the polygenic nature of pre-eclampsia, a majority of the studies that have been conducted thus far on the topic have utilized genome-wide association studies.

One known effector of pre-eclampsia is the fetal locus FLT1. Located on chromosome 13 in the q12 region, FLT1 codes for Fms-like tyrosine kinase 1, an angiogenic factor expressed in fetal trophoblasts. Angiogenic factors are crucial for vascular growth in the placenta. An FLT1 soluble isoform caused by a splice variant is sFLT1, which works as an antiangiogenic factor, reducing vascular growth in the placenta. A balance between these factors characterizes a healthy, normotensive pregnancy. However, upregulation of this variant and overexpression of sFL1 can contribute to endothelial dysfunction. Reduced vascular growth and endothelial dysfunction manifest primarily in maternal symptoms such as kidney failure, swelling, and seizures. However, these factors can also lead to inadequate oxygen, nutrient, or blood supply to the fetus. Furthermore, in this locus region, several single-nucleotide polymorphisms (SNPs) have been observed to impact the overexpression of sFL1. Specifically, SNPs rs12050029 and rs4769613's risk alleles are linked with low red blood cell counts and an increased risk of late-onset pre-eclampsia.

Patau syndrome, or Trisomy 13, is also associated with the upregulation of sFLT1 due to the extra copy of the 13th chromosome. Because of this upregulation of an antiangiogenic factor, women with trisomy 13 pregnancies often experience reduced placental vascularization and are at higher risk for developing pre-eclampsia.

Beyond fetal loci, some maternal loci have been identified as effectors of pre-eclampsia. Alpha-ketoglutarate-dependent hydroxylase expression on chromosome 16 in the q12 region is also associated with pre-eclampsia. Specifically, allele rs1421085 heightens the risk of not just pre-eclampsia but also an increase in BMI and hypertension. This pleiotropy is one of the reasons why these traits are considered to be a risk factor. Furthermore, ZNF831 (zinc finger protein 831) and its loci on chromosome 20q13 were identified as another significant factor in pre-eclampsia. The risk allele rs259983 is also associated with both pre-eclampsia and hypertension, further evidence that the two traits are possibly linked.

While the current understanding suggests that maternal alleles are the main hereditary cause of pre-eclampsia, paternal loci have also been implicated. In one study, paternal DLX5 (Distal-Less Homeobox 5) was identified as an imprinted gene. Located on chromosome 7 in the q21 region, DLX5 serves as a transcription factor often linked with the developmental growth of organs. When paternally inherited, DLX5 and its SNP rs73708843 are shown to play a role in trophoblast proliferation, affecting vascular growth and nutrient delivery.

Besides specific loci, several important genetic regulatory factors contribute to the development of pre-eclampsia. Micro RNAs, or miRNAs, are noncoding mRNAs that downregulate posttranscriptional gene expression through RNA-induced silencing complexes. In the placenta, miRNAs are crucial for regulating cell growth, angiogenesis, cell proliferation, and metabolism. These placental-specific miRNAs are clustered in large groups, mainly on chromosomes 14 and 19, and irregular expression of either is associated with an increased risk of an affected pregnancy. For instance, miR-16 and miR-29 are vascular endothelial growth factors (VEGFs) and play a role in upregulating sFLT-1. In particular, the overexpression of miRNA miR-210 has been shown to induce hypoxia, which affects spiral artery remodeling, an important part of the pathogenesis of pre-eclampsia.

=== Risk factors ===
Known risk factors for pre-eclampsia include:

- Having never previously given birth
- Diabetes mellitus
- Endometriosis
- Obesity
- Advanced maternal age (>35 years)
- Kidney disease
- Untreated hypertension
- Prior history of pre-eclampsia
- Family history of pre-eclampsia
- Antiphospholipid antibody syndrome
- Multiple gestation
- Having donated a kidney
- Having sub-clinical hypothyroidism or thyroid antibodies
- Placental abnormalities such as placental ischemia
- Socioeconomics play a large role in the prevalence of these risk factors, and, like other processes, each risk factor plays a role in the likelihood of increased consequences (morbidity) to, and the complexity of care for, the hospitalized patient

== Pathogenesis ==
Although much research into the mechanism of pre-eclampsia has taken place, its exact pathogenesis remains uncertain. Pre-eclampsia is thought to result from an abnormal placenta, the removal of which ends the disease in most cases. During normal pregnancy, the placenta vascularizes to allow for the exchange of water, gases, and solutes, including nutrients and wastes, between maternal and fetal circulations. Abnormal development of the placenta leads to poor placental perfusion. The placenta of women with pre-eclampsia is abnormal and characterized by poor trophoblastic invasion. It is thought that this results in oxidative stress, hypoxia, and the release of factors that promote endothelial dysfunction, inflammation, and other possible reactions.

In normal early embryonic development, the outer epithelial layer contains cytotrophoblast cells, a stem cell type found in the trophoblast that later differentiates into the fetal placenta. These cells differentiate into many placental cell types, including extravillous trophoblast cells. Extravillous trophoblast cells are an invasive cell type that remodels the maternal spiral arteries by replacing the maternal epithelium and smooth muscle lining the spiral arteries, thus causing and maintaining spiral artery dilation. This prevents maternal vasoconstriction in the spiral arteries and allows for continued blood and nutrient supply to the growing fetus with low resistance and high blood flow.

The clinical manifestations of pre-eclampsia are associated with general endothelial dysfunction, including vasoconstriction and end-organ ischemia. Implicit in this generalized endothelial dysfunction may be an imbalance of angiogenic and anti-angiogenic factors. Both circulating and placental levels of soluble fms-like tyrosine kinase-1 (sFlt-1) are higher in women with pre-eclampsia than in women with normal pregnancy. sFlt-1 is an anti-angiogenic protein that antagonizes vascular endothelial growth factor (VEGF) and placental growth factor (PIGF), both of which are proangiogenic factors. Soluble endoglin (sEng) has also been shown to be elevated in women with pre-eclampsia and has anti-angiogenic properties, much like sFlt-1 does.

Both sFlt-1 and sEng are upregulated in all pregnant women to some extent, supporting the idea that hypertensive disease in pregnancy is a normal pregnancy adaptation gone awry. As natural killer cells are intimately involved in placentation and placentation involves a degree of maternal immune tolerance for a foreign placenta, it is not surprising that the maternal immune system might respond more negatively to the arrival of some placentae under certain circumstances, such as a placenta that is more invasive than normal. Initial maternal rejection of the placental cytotrophoblasts may be the cause of the inadequately remodeled spiral arteries in those cases of pre-eclampsia associated with shallow implantation, leading to downstream hypoxia and the appearance of maternal symptoms in response to upregulated sFlt-1 and sEng.

Oxidative stress may also play an important part in the pathogenesis of pre-eclampsia. The main source of reactive oxygen species (ROS) is the enzyme xanthine oxidase (XO), and this enzyme mainly occurs in the liver. One hypothesis is that increased purine catabolism from placental hypoxia results in increased ROS production in the maternal liver and release into the maternal circulation, which causes endothelial cell damage.

Abnormalities in the maternal immune system and insufficiency of gestational immune tolerance seem to play major roles in pre-eclampsia. One of the main differences found in pre-eclampsia is a shift toward Th_{1} responses and the production of IFN-γ. The origin of IFN-γ is not clearly identified and could be the natural killer cells of the uterus, the placental dendritic cells modulating responses of T helper cells, alterations in the synthesis of or response to regulatory molecules, or changes in the function of regulatory T cells in pregnancy. Aberrant immune responses promoting pre-eclampsia may also be due to an altered fetal allorecognition or to inflammatory triggers. It has been documented that fetal cells such as fetal erythroblasts as well as cell-free fetal DNA are increased in the maternal circulation in women who develop pre-eclampsia. These findings have given rise to the hypothesis that pre-eclampsia is a disease process by which a placental lesion, such as hypoxia, allows increased fetal material into the maternal circulation, which in turn leads to an immune response and endothelial damage, and that ultimately results in pre-eclampsia and eclampsia.

One hypothesis for vulnerability to pre-eclampsia is the maternal-fetal conflict between the maternal organism and fetus. After the first trimester trophoblasts enter the spiral arteries of the mother to alter the spiral arteries and thereby gain more access to maternal nutrients. Occasionally there is impaired trophoblast invasion that results in inadequate alterations to the uterine spiral arteries. It is hypothesized that the developing embryo releases biochemical signals that result in the woman developing hypertension and pre-eclampsia so that the fetus can benefit from a greater amount of maternal circulation of nutrients due to increased blood flow to the impaired placenta. This results in a conflict between maternal and fetal fitness and survival: the fetus is invested in only its survival and fitness, while the mother is invested in this and subsequent pregnancies.

In pre-eclampsia, abnormal expression of chromosome 19 microRNA cluster (C19MC) in placental cell lines reduces extravillus trophoblast migration. Specific microRNAs in this cluster, which might cause abnormal spiral artery invasion, include miR-520h, miR-520b, and 520c-3p. This impairs extravillus trophoblast cells' invasion of the maternal spiral arteries, causing high resistance and low blood flow, and low nutrient supply to the fetus. There is tentative evidence that vitamin supplementation can decrease the risk.

Immune factors may also play a role.

== Diagnosis ==
Pre-eclampsia laboratory values
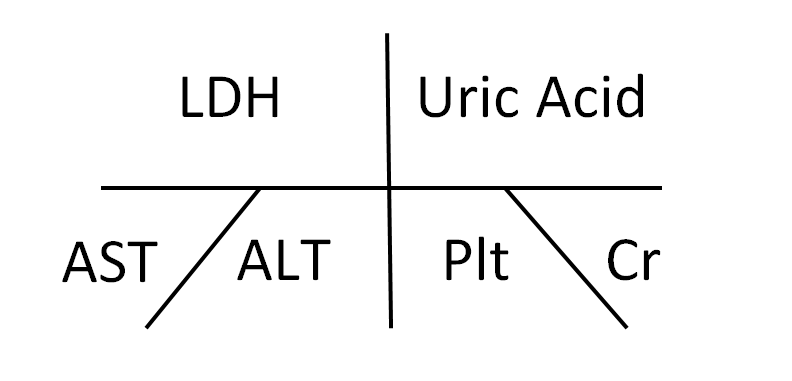
- Shorthand for laboratory values commonly used in pre-eclampsia. LDH=Lactate dehydrogenase, Uric acid=Uric acid, AST=Aspartate aminotransferase, ALT=Alanine aminotransferase, Plt=Platelets, Cr=Creatinine.
- Reference range: LDH: 105–333 IU/L; Uric Acid: 2.4–6.0 mg/dL; AST: 5–40 U/L; ALT: 7–56 U/L; Plt: 140–450 billion/L; Cr: 0.6–1.2 mg/dL
- MeSH: D007770
- LOINC: Codes for pre-eclampsia

Testing for pre-eclampsia is recommended throughout pregnancy via measuring a woman's blood pressure.

=== Diagnostic criteria ===
Pre-eclampsia is diagnosed when a pregnant woman develops:

- Blood pressure ≥140 mmHg systolic or ≥90 mmHg diastolic on two separate readings taken at least four to six hours apart after 20 weeks of gestation in an individual with previously normal blood pressure.
- In a woman with essential hypertension beginning before 20 weeks of gestational age, the diagnostic criteria are an increase in systolic blood pressure (SBP) of ≥30 mmHg or an increase in diastolic blood pressure (DBP) of ≥15 mmHg.
- Proteinuria ≥ 0.3 grams (300 mg) or more of protein in a 24-hour urine sample or a SPOT urinary protein to creatinine ratio ≥0.3 or a urine dipstick reading of 1+ or greater (dipstick reading should only be used if other quantitative methods are not available).

Suspicion for pre-eclampsia should be maintained in any pregnancy complicated by elevated blood pressure, even in the absence of proteinuria. Ten percent of individuals with other signs and symptoms of pre-eclampsia and 20% of individuals diagnosed with eclampsia show no evidence of proteinuria. In the absence of proteinuria, the presence of new-onset hypertension (elevated blood pressure) and the new onset of one or more of the following is suggestive of the diagnosis of pre-eclampsia:

- Evidence of kidney dysfunction (oliguria, elevated creatinine levels)
- Impaired liver function (noted by liver function tests)
- Thrombocytopenia (platelet count <100,000/microliter)
- Pulmonary edema
- Ankle edema (pitting type)
- Cerebral or visual disturbances

Pre-eclampsia is a progressive disorder, and these signs of organ dysfunction are indicative of severe pre-eclampsia. A systolic blood pressure ≥160 or diastolic blood pressure ≥110 and/or proteinuria >5g in 24 hours is also indicative of severe pre-eclampsia. Clinically, individuals with severe pre-eclampsia may also present epigastric/right upper quadrant abdominal pain, headaches, and vomiting. Severe pre-eclampsia is a significant risk factor for intrauterine fetal death.

A rise in baseline blood pressure (BP) of 30 mmHg systolic or 15 mmHg diastolic, while not meeting the absolute criteria of 140/90, is important to note but is not considered diagnostic.

=== Predictive tests ===
There have been many assessments of tests aimed at predicting pre-eclampsia, though no single biomarker is likely to be sufficiently predictive of the disorder. Predictive tests that have been assessed include those related to placental perfusion, vascular resistance, kidney dysfunction, endothelial dysfunction, and oxidative stress. Examples of notable tests include:

- Doppler ultrasonography of the uterine arteries to investigate for signs of inadequate placental perfusion. This test has a high negative predictive value among those individuals with a history of prior pre-eclampsia.
- Some use elevations in serum uric acid (hyperuricemia) to "define" pre-eclampsia, though it is a poor predictor of the disorder. Elevated levels in the blood (hyperuricemia) are likely due to reduced uric acid clearance secondary to impaired kidney function.
- Angiogenic proteins such as vascular endothelial growth factor (VEGF) and placental growth factor (PIGF), and anti-angiogenic proteins such as soluble fms-like tyrosine kinase-1 (sFlt-1) have shown promise for potential clinical use in diagnosing pre-eclampsia. A 2017 study, ASPRE, has reported a significant performance in identifying pregnant women at high risk of pre-eclampsia during the first trimester of pregnancy. Using a combination of maternal history, mean arterial blood pressure, intrauterine Doppler, and PlGF measurement, the study has shown a capacity to identify more than 75% of the women who will develop pre-eclampsia, allowing early intervention to prevent the development of later symptoms. This approach is now officially recommended by the International Federation of Gynecologists & Obstetricians (FIGO). However, this model specializes in predicting pre-eclampsia with onset before 34 weeks of gestation, while the prediction of pre-eclampsia with later onset remains challenging.
- 2011 studies have shown that looking for podocytes (specialized cells of the kidney) in the urine has the potential to aid in the prediction of pre-eclampsia. Studies have demonstrated that finding podocytes in the urine may serve as an early marker of and diagnostic test for pre-eclampsia.

=== Differential diagnosis ===
Pre-eclampsia can mimic and be confused with many other diseases, including chronic hypertension, chronic renal disease, primary seizure disorders, gallbladder and pancreatic disease, immune or thrombotic thrombocytopenic purpura, antiphospholipid syndrome, and hemolytic-uremic syndrome. It must be considered in any pregnant woman beyond 20 weeks of gestation. It is difficult to diagnose when pre-existing conditions such as hypertension are present. Women with acute fatty liver of pregnancy may also present with elevated blood pressure and protein in the urine, but differ by the extent of liver damage. Other disorders that can cause high blood pressure include thyrotoxicosis, pheochromocytoma, and drug misuse.

== Prevention ==
Preventive measures against pre-eclampsia have been heavily studied. Because the pathogenesis of pre-eclampsia is not completely understood, prevention remains a complex issue. Some currently accepted recommendations are:

=== Diet ===
Supplementation with a balanced protein and energy diet does not appear to reduce the risk of pre-eclampsia. Further, no evidence suggests that changing salt intake has an effect.

Supplementation with antioxidants such as vitamin C, D and E has no effect on pre-eclampsia incidence; therefore, supplementation with vitamins C, E, and D is not recommended for reducing the risk of pre-eclampsia.

Previous guidelines, including the WHO 2011 recommendation, suggested that calcium supplementation of at least 1 gram per day during pregnancy could help prevent pre-eclampsia, particularly in women with low dietary calcium intake or those at high risk. However, updated evidence indicates that calcium supplements may have little or no effect on preventing pre-eclampsia or related complications for mothers or babies. Most studies started supplementation in the second trimester, so the effectiveness of earlier supplementation remains unclear.

Higher selenium level is associated with a lower incidence of pre-eclampsia. Higher cadmium level is associated with higher incidence of pre-eclampsia.

=== Aspirin ===
Taking aspirin is associated with a 1 to 5% reduction in pre-eclampsia and a 1 to 5% reduction in premature births in women at high risk. The World Health Organization recommends low-dose aspirin for the prevention of pre-eclampsia in women at high risk and recommends it be started before 20 weeks of pregnancy. The United States Preventive Services Task Force recommends a low-dose regimen for women at high risk beginning in the 12th week. Benefits are less if started after 16 weeks. Since 2018 the American College of Obstetricians and Gynecologists has recommended low-dose aspirin therapy as standard preventive treatment for pre-eclampsia. There is a reported problem of its efficacy when combined with paracetamol. Supplementation of aspirin with L-Arginine has shown favourable results.

In addition to effectively identifying women at risk of pre-eclampsia with first-trimester screening, the aforementioned ASPRE study also demonstrated a high efficacy of aspirin treatment among those identified to be at risk by the algorithm. 150 mg/d aspirin, when taken at bedtime and started before week 16 of pregnancy by at-risk women, reduced the rates of preterm (< 37 week) pre-eclampsia by 62%. Early (< 32 week) PE was reduced by 80% and there was no change in term PE rates. Additional analysis of ASPRE data suggests that aspirin works by delaying the development of PE.

=== Physical activity ===
There is insufficient evidence to recommend either exercise or strict bedrest as preventive measures of pre-eclampsia.

=== Smoking cessation ===
In low-risk pregnancies, the association between cigarette smoking and a reduced risk of pre-eclampsia has been consistent and reproducible across epidemiologic studies. High-risk pregnancies (those with pregestational diabetes, chronic hypertension, history of pre-eclampsia in a previous pregnancy, or multifetal gestation) showed no significant protective effect. The reason for this discrepancy is not definitively known; research supports speculation that the underlying pathology increases the risk of pre-eclampsia to such a degree that any measurable reduction of risk due to smoking is masked. However, the damaging effects of smoking on overall health and pregnancy outcomes outweigh the benefits in decreasing the incidence of pre-eclampsia. It is recommended that smoking be stopped before, during, and after pregnancy.

=== Immune modulation ===
Observational studies have suggested the importance of a woman's gestational immunological tolerance to her baby's father, as the baby and father share genetics. More specifically, it was proposed that some cases of pre-eclampsia may be linked to a breakdown of maternal T-cell tolerance for the fetus. However, more recent studies (as of 2019) have found no evidence that this is a risk factor for pre-eclampsia or other adverse pregnancy outcomes.

There is a decreased incidence of pre-eclampsia in women who have received blood transfusions from their partner, those with long preceding histories of sex without barrier contraceptives, and women who have been regularly performing oral sex. Having noted the potential importance of a woman's immunological tolerance to her baby's paternal genes, several Dutch reproductive biologists decided to take their research further. Consistent with the fact that human immune systems tolerate things better when they enter the body via the mouth, the Dutch researchers conducted a series of studies that confirmed a surprisingly strong correlation between a diminished incidence of pre-eclampsia and a woman's practice of oral sex and noted that the protective effects were strongest if she swallowed her partner's semen.

A team from the University of Adelaide has also investigated to see if men who have fathered pregnancies which have ended in miscarriage or pre-eclampsia had low seminal levels of critical immune modulating factors such as TGF-beta. The team has found that certain men, dubbed "dangerous males", are several times more likely to father pregnancies that would end in either pre-eclampsia or miscarriage. Among other things, most of the "dangerous males" seemed to lack sufficient levels of the seminal immune factors necessary to induce immunological tolerance in their partners. As the theory of immune intolerance as a cause of pre-eclampsia has gained prominence, women with repeated pre-eclampsia, miscarriages, or in vitro fertilization failures could potentially be administered key immune factors such as TGF-beta along with the father's foreign proteins, possibly either orally, as a sublingual spray, or as a vaginal gel to be applied onto the vaginal wall before intercourse.

Regardless of these pieces of suggestive evidence, no definitive link has been found between T-cells overcoming the many layers of protection against killing placental trophoblasts and failing pregnancies as of 2019.

Another group of immune cells has gained some recognition, however. The main maternal leukocytes present at the time of implantation are uterine natural killer cells (uNKs), not T-cells. NK cells use KIR receptors on their surface to recognize the HLA-C molecules on the surfaces of extravillous trophoblast (EVT) cells. In cases of disorders of pregnancy associated with defective placentation (pre-eclampsia, unexplained stillbirth, fetal growth restriction), the combination of a mother homozygous for a KIR A haplotype and a fetus carrying a C2^{+}HLA-C allele is over-represented compared to the normal population. Immunogenetic studies have further revealed the importance of EVT recognition by uNK. uNKs appear to play a role in remodeling the spinal arteries of the placenta, but not much is known about what they do exactly in normal and abnormal pregnancies.

== Treatment ==
The definitive treatment for pre-eclampsia is the delivery of the baby and placenta. The danger to the mother persists after delivery, and full recovery can take days or weeks. The timing of delivery should balance the desire for optimal outcomes for the baby while reducing risks for the mother. The severity of the disease and the maturity of the baby are primary considerations. These considerations are situation-specific, and management will vary with situation, location, and institution. Treatment can range from expectant management to expedited delivery by induction of labor or caesarean section. In the case of preterm delivery, additional treatments, including corticosteroid injection to accelerate fetal pulmonary maturation and magnesium sulfate for prevention of cerebral palsy, should be considered. Important in management is the assessment of the mother's organ systems, management of severe hypertension, and prevention and treatment of eclamptic seizures. Separate interventions directed at the baby may also be necessary. Bed rest is not useful and is thus not routinely recommended.

=== Blood pressure ===
The World Health Organization recommends that women with severe hypertension during pregnancy should receive treatment with anti-hypertensive agents. Severe hypertension is generally considered systolic BP of at least 160 or diastolic BP of at least 110. Evidence does not support the use of one anti-hypertensive over another. The choice of which agent to use should be based on the prescribing clinician's experience with a particular agent, its cost, and its availability. Diuretics are not recommended for prevention of pre-eclampsia and its complications. Labetalol, hydralazine and nifedipine are commonly used antihypertensive agents for hypertension in pregnancy. ACE inhibitors and angiotensin receptor blockers are contraindicated as they affect fetal development.

The goal of the treatment of severe hypertension in pregnancy is to prevent cardiovascular, kidney, and cerebrovascular complications. The target blood pressure has been proposed to be 140–160 mmHg systolic and 90–105 mmHg diastolic, although values are variable.

=== Prevention of eclampsia ===
The intrapartum and postpartum administration of magnesium sulfate is recommended in severe pre-eclampsia for the prevention of eclampsia. Further, magnesium sulfate is recommended for the treatment of eclampsia over other anticonvulsants. Magnesium sulfate acts by interacting with NMDA receptors.

== Epidemiology ==
Pre-eclampsia affects approximately 2–8% of all pregnancies worldwide. The incidence of pre-eclampsia has risen in the U.S. since the 1990s, possibly as a result of an increased prevalence of predisposing disorders, such as chronic hypertension, diabetes, and obesity.

Pre-eclampsia is one of the leading causes of maternal and perinatal morbidity and mortality worldwide. Nearly one-tenth of all maternal deaths in Africa and Asia and one-quarter in Latin America are associated with hypertensive diseases in pregnancy, a category that encompasses pre-eclampsia.

Pre-eclampsia is much more common in women who are pregnant for the first time. Women who have previously been diagnosed with pre-eclampsia are also more likely to experience pre-eclampsia in subsequent pregnancies. Pre-eclampsia is also more common in women who have pre-existing hypertension, obesity, diabetes, autoimmune diseases such as lupus, various inherited thrombophilias such as Factor V Leiden, renal disease, multiple gestation (twins or multiple birth), and advanced maternal age. Women who live at high altitude are also more likely to experience pre-eclampsia. Pre-eclampsia is also more common in some ethnic groups (e.g. African-Americans, Sub-Saharan Africans, Latin Americans, African Caribbeans, and Filipinos).

Eclampsia is a major complication of pre-eclampsia. Eclampsia affects 0.56 per 1,000 pregnant women in developed countries and almost 10 to 30 times as many women in low-income countries as in developed countries.

== Complications ==
Complications of pre-eclampsia can affect both the mother and the fetus. Acutely, pre-eclampsia can be complicated by eclampsia, the development of HELLP syndrome, hemorrhagic or ischemic stroke, liver damage and dysfunction, acute kidney injury, and acute respiratory distress syndrome (ARDS).

Pre-eclampsia is also associated with increased frequency of caesarean section, preterm delivery, and placental abruption. Furthermore, an elevation in blood pressure can occur in some individuals in the first week postpartum, attributable to volume expansion and fluid mobilization. Fetal complications include fetal growth restriction and potential fetal or perinatal death.

Long-term, an individual with pre-eclampsia is at increased risk for recurrence of pre-eclampsia in subsequent pregnancies.

=== Eclampsia ===
Eclampsia is the development of new convulsions in a pre-eclamptic patient that may not be attributed to other causes. It is a sign that the underlying pre-eclamptic condition is severe and is associated with high rates of perinatal and maternal morbidity and mortality. Warning symptoms for eclampsia in an individual with current pre-eclampsia may include headaches, visual disturbances, and right upper quadrant or epigastric abdominal pain, with a headache being the most consistent symptom. During pregnancy brisk or hyperactive reflexes are common, however, ankle clonus is a sign of neuromuscular irritability that usually reflects severe pre-eclampsia and also can precede eclampsia. Magnesium sulfate is used to prevent convulsions in cases of severe pre-eclampsia.

=== HELLP Syndrome ===
HELLP syndrome is defined as hemolysis (microangiopathic), elevated liver enzymes (liver dysfunction), and low platelets (thrombocytopenia). This condition may occur in 10–20% of patients with severe pre-eclampsia and eclampsia and is associated with increased maternal and fetal morbidity and mortality. In 50% of instances, HELLP syndrome develops preterm, while 20% of cases develop in late gestation and 30% during the post-partum period.

=== Long term ===
Preeclampsia predisposes to future cardiovascular disease, and a history of preeclampsia/eclampsia doubles the risk for cardiovascular mortality later in life. Other risks include stroke, chronic hypertension, kidney disease and venous thromboembolism. Preeclampsia and cardiovascular disease share many risk factors such as age, elevated BMI, family history, and certain chronic diseases.

It seems that pre-eclampsia does not increase the risk of cancer.

Lowered blood supply to the fetus in pre-eclampsia causes lowered nutrient supply, which could result in intrauterine growth restriction (IUGR) and low birth weight. The fetal origins hypothesis states that fetal undernutrition is linked with coronary heart disease later in adult life due to disproportionate growth.

Because pre-eclampsia leads to a mismatch between the maternal energy supply and fetal energy demands, pre-eclampsia can lead to IUGR in the developing fetus. Infants with IUGR are prone to have poor neuronal development and are at increased risk for adult disease according to the Barker hypothesis. Associated adult diseases of the fetus due to IUGR include, but are not limited to, coronary artery disease (CAD), type 2 diabetes mellitus (T2DM), cancer, osteoporosis, and various psychiatric illnesses.

The risk of pre-eclampsia and the development of placental dysfunction has also been shown to be recurrent cross-generationally on the maternal side and most likely on the paternal side. Fetuses born to mothers who were born small for gestational age (SGA) were 50% more likely to develop pre-eclampsia. Fetuses born to both SGA parents were threefold more likely to develop pre-eclampsia in future pregnancies.

== Postpartum pre-eclampsia ==
Pre-eclampsia can also occur in the postpartum period or after delivery. There are currently no clear definitions or guidelines for postpartum pre-eclampsia. Experts have proposed a definition of new-onset pre-eclampsia that occurs between 48 hours after delivery and up to six weeks after delivery.

The diagnostic criteria otherwise are essentially the same as for pre-eclampsia diagnosed during pregnancy. Similarly, many of the risk factors are the same, except that not having been pregnant previously does not seem to be a risk factor for postpartum pre-eclampsia. There are other risk factors related to the labor and/or delivery that are associated with postpartum pre-eclampsia like cesarean delivery and higher rates of intravenous fluids.

The American College of Obstetricians and Gynecologists recommends blood pressure evaluation for patients who have any hypertensive disorder of pregnancy within 7–10 days after delivery. Home blood pressure monitoring may increase the likelihood of measuring blood pressure during these recommended time periods.

In general, the treatment of postpartum pre-eclampsia is the same as during pregnancy, including using anti-hypertensive medications to lower blood pressure and magnesium sulfate to prevent eclampsia. The same blood pressure medications used during pregnancy can be used postpartum. Other medications can be used when there is no longer a concern for the developing fetus. In general, ACE inhibitors, beta-blockers, and calcium channel blockers all appear to be safe in lactating patients. No data show that any one medication is most effective for postpartum blood pressure management. In addition, there is evidence that the use of a diuretic, furosemide, may shorten the duration of hypertension in patients with postpartum preeclampsia.

== Other animals ==
Primates can also rarely experience pre-eclampsia. In 2024, a female western lowland gorilla was diagnosed with pre-eclampsia and had a successful caesarean section.

== Two-kinds of pre-eclampsia ==
As far back as 1996, it was implied that various pathological events can lead to hypertension combined with organ dysfunction during the second half of pregnancy. Over time, increasing levels of research results support this opinion. Early findings, challenging the homogenous disease conception, reported higher than average maternal blood volume (suggesting yet another pathway to hypertension), high fetal weight (excluding placental insufficiency), and increased cerebral blood flow (contrary to vasoconstriction) among patients afflicted with pre-eclampsia.

Since 2003, it has been recommended to separate pre-eclampsia cases into early- or late-onset subtypes based on the onset of clinical symptoms (before or at/following 34 weeks of gestation), as early-onset cases bear a much worse outcome than when compared with late-onset cases.

Clinically, two (sub)types of pre-eclampsia can be distinguished by main characteristics:

Early-onset (also referred to as hypovolemic, type I, preterm, placental) pre-eclampsia is basically characterized with contracted blood volume, vasoconstriction, thrombotic microangiopathy, fetal growth restriction and oligohydramnios. Late-onset (also signaled as hypervolemic, type II, term, maternal) pre-eclampsia is associated with augmented blood volume, vasodilatation, marked venous stasis, and normal or increased fetal weight.

The late-onset type is much more common than the early-onset type. Obesity is a high-risk factor, especially in the case of late-onset pre-eclampsia. Aspirin can effectively delay and alleviate symptoms in early-onset cases; diuretics show promise in late-onset, hypervolemic pre-eclampsia.

== See also ==
Gestational hypertension

== Sources ==
- WHO recommendations for prevention and treatment of pre-eclampsia and eclampsia. World Health Organization. 2011. hdl:10665/44703. ISBN 978-92-4-454833-2.
- Cunningham FG, Leveno KJ, Bloom S, Gilstrap L, eds. (2010). Williams obstetrics (23rd ed.). New York: McGraw-Hill Medical. ISBN 978-0-07-149701-5.
