= C19MC miRNA cluster =

The C19MC miRNA cluster is a microRNA cluster consisting of 46 genes. These 46 genes encode 59 mature miRNAs. The C19MC miRNA cluster is only found in primate (including human) genomes and expresses miRNAs almost exclusively in the placenta, but also in testis, embryonic stem cells, and some tumors. They are also expressed highly in trophoblast-derived vesicles, including exosomes. C19MC miRNAs have been shown to be among the most expressed miRNAs in the human placenta and are also found in the serum of pregnant women.

Trophoblast cells, found in the human placenta, produce many different types of microRNAs (miRNAs). MicroRNAs play a role in placental development or physiology.

Some placental cell lines derived from trophoblasts also express C19MC miRNA, including the choriocarcinoma lines JEG3, JAr, and BeWo, but not HTR8/SVneo.
