= AAMP (gene) =

Protein-coding gene in humans

Identifiers
- Aliases: AAMP, angio associated migratory cell protein
- External IDs: OMIM: 603488; MGI: 107809; GeneCards: AAMP

Gene location (Human)
Chr.	Chromosome 2 (human)
Band	2q35	Start	218,264,129 bp
Band	2q35	End	218,270,178 bp

Gene location (Mouse)
Chr.	Chromosome 1 (mouse)
Band	1 C3|1 38.53 cM	Start	74,318,999 bp
Band	1 C3|1 38.53 cM	End	74,323,897 bp
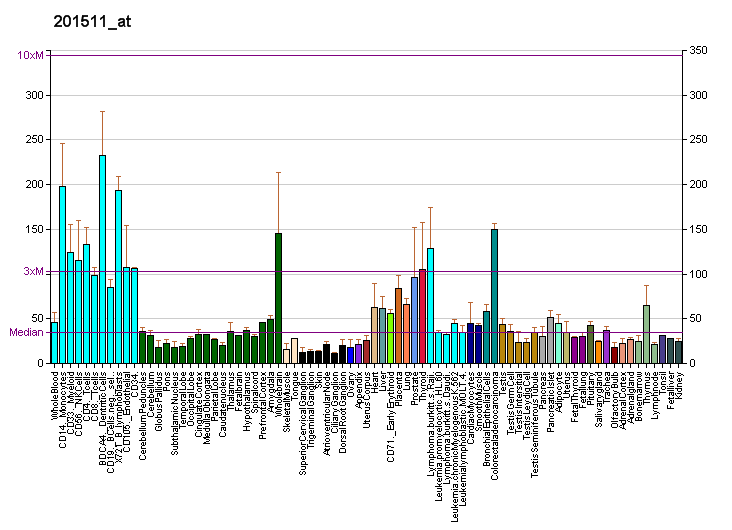
RNA expression pattern
Bgee	Human / Mouse (ortholog); Top expressed in: body of stomach; mucosa of transverse colon; left ovary; right ovary; anterior pituitary; gastric mucosa; skin of leg; stromal cell of endometrium; left lobe of thyroid gland; skin of abdomen / Top expressed in: spermatid; saccule; spermatocyte; otic placode; seminiferous tubule; choroid plexus of fourth ventricle; otic vesicle; lactiferous gland; yolk sac; dentate gyrus of hippocampal formation granule cell; More reference expression data
BioGPS	More reference expression data
Gene ontology
Molecular function	unfolded protein binding; heparin binding
Cellular component	microtubule cytoskeleton; intercellular bridge; cytosol; cell surface; plasma membrane; membrane; preribosome, large subunit precursor; cytoplasm
Biological process	positive regulation of endothelial cell migration; multicellular organism development; cell differentiation; angiogenesis; smooth muscle cell migration; ribosomal large subunit biogenesis
Sources:Amigo / QuickGO
Orthologs
Databases	NCBI: entry; OMA: entry
Species	Human	Mouse
Entrez	14	227290
Ensembl	ENSG00000127837	ENSMUSG00000006299
UniProt	Q13685	n/a
RefSeq (mRNA)	NM_001302545; NM_001087	NM_001190444; NM_146110
RefSeq (protein)	NP_001078; NP_001289474	n/a
Location (UCSC)	Chr 2: 218.26 – 218.27 Mb	Chr 1: 74.32 – 74.32 Mb
PubMed search
- Wikidata
View/Edit Human	View/Edit Mouse

Angio-associated, migratory cell protein, also known as AAMP, is a protein which in humans is encoded by the AAMP gene. This protein has been conserved in evolution and is so common to many mammals. and it also has a yeast homolog which is the protein YCR072c.

== Localisation ==
The gene is located on the second human chromosome, near the end of the chromosome's arm (2q35), between the codons 85-87 and 1387–1389. It contains 6042 bp and 11 exons When transcribed, it gives a 1859 bp mRNA. . The vascular endothelial growth factor is a promoting factor of the protein synthesis and localisation in the different parts of the cells. The protein's expression is higher in the intracellular than in the extracellular space.

== Function ==
The gene product is an immunoglobulin-type protein of 434 amino acids and 49 kDa. It is found to be expressed strongly in the cytosol of endothelial cells, cytotrophoblasts, and poorly differentiated colon adenocarcinoma cells found in lymphatics and has been observed at the luminal edges of endometrial cells and in the extracellular environment of vascular-associated mesenchymal cells.

The protein contains a WD40 domain which permits multi-proteins complexes formation and a heparin-binding domain which mediates heparin-sensitive cell adhesion. AAMP helps to regulate vascular endothelial cell migration regulation and angiogenesis, with other signaling pathway like RhoA/Rho-kinase signaling. A malfunction can therefore lead to different diseases (see Associated diseases). For example, in the smooth muscle cells, if AAMP is overexpressed, it activates RhoA, which activates Rho-kinase (this one generates GTP) and it finally leads to increased smooth muscle cell migration and division, causing atherosclerosis and restenosis.

== Associated diseases ==
Note : In all these diseases we can observe the expression of the AAMP gene. This one can either remain stable, increase or decrease depending on the disease.

List of the diseases : gastrointestinal stromal tumor (GIST) (for this disease and the ductal carcinomas, the expression levels are to correlate with necrosis in situ), myeloid leukemia (chronic (CML) and acute (AML) forms), lymphoma, breast cancer, glial brain tumors, colon neoplasia, epidermoid carcinoma, cervical cancer, ovarian cancer, papillary thyroid cancer, pulmonary cancer, atherosclerosis, restenosis.
