= Choriocarcinoma =

Malignant cancer, usually of the placenta

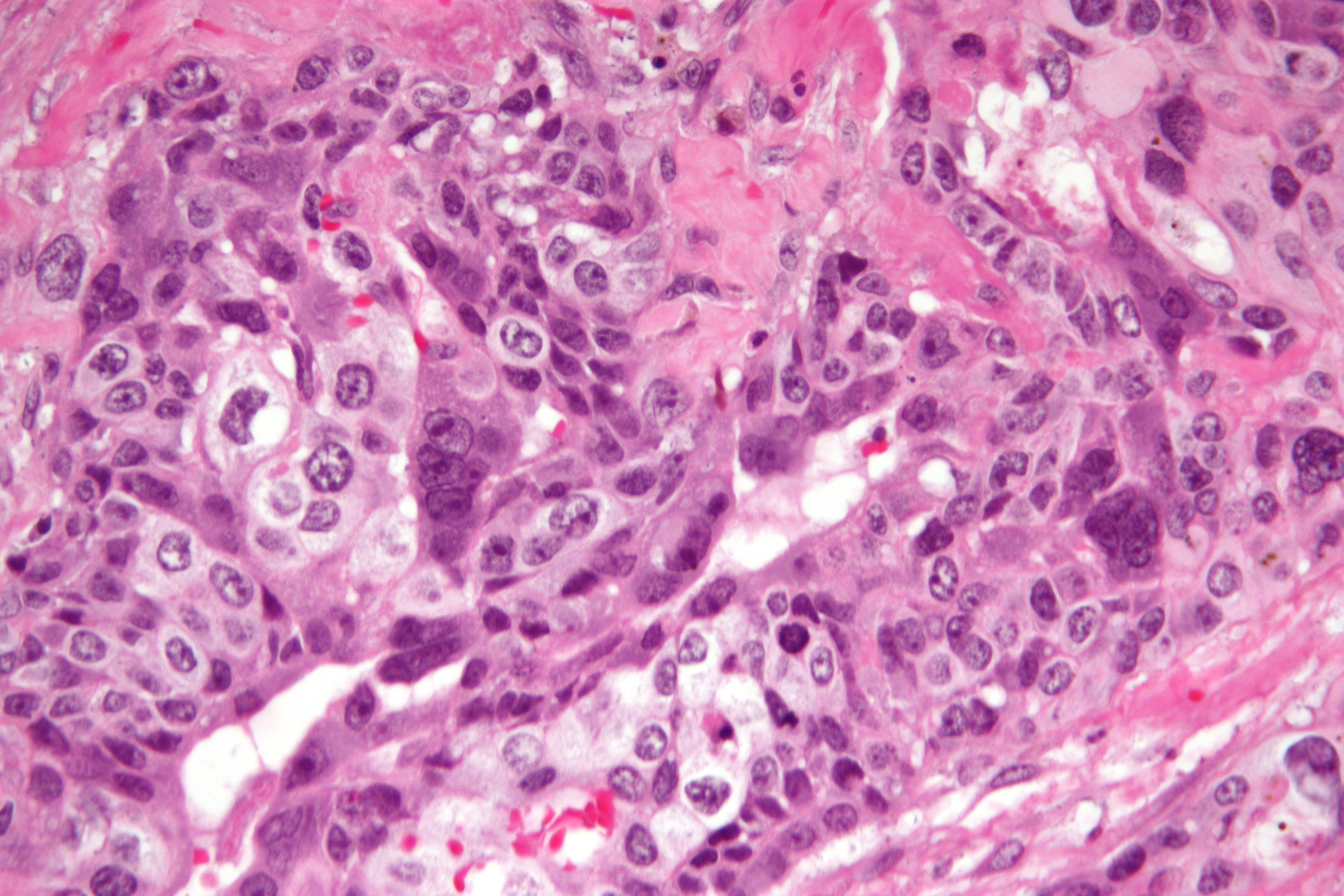
- Micrograph of choriocarcinoma showing both of the components necessary for the diagnosis – cytotrophoblasts and syncytiotrophoblasts. The syncytiotrophoblasts are multinucleated and have a dark staining cytoplasm. The cytotrophoblasts are mononuclear and have a pale staining cytoplasm. H&E stain.
- Specialty: Oncology

Choriocarcinoma is a trophoblastic cancer usually located on the placenta. It is characterized by early hematogenous spread to the lungs. It belongs to the malignant end of the spectrum in gestational trophoblastic disease (GTD). It is also classified as a germ cell tumor and may arise in the testis or ovary.

== Signs and symptoms ==
- increased quantitative chorionic gonadotropin (the "pregnancy hormone") levels
- vaginal bleeding
- shortness of breath
- hemoptysis (coughing up blood)
- chest pain
- chest X-ray shows multiple infiltrates of various shapes in both lungs
- presents in males as a testicular cancer, sometimes with skin hyperpigmentation (from excess chorionic gonadotropin cross-reacting with the alpha MSH receptor), gynecomastia, and weight loss (from excess chorionic gonadotropin cross-reacting with the LH, FSH, and TSH receptor) in males
- can present with decreased thyroid-stimulating hormone (TSH) due to hyperthyroidism.

== Cause ==
Choriocarcinoma of the placenta during pregnancy is preceded by:

- hydatidiform mole (50% of cases)
- spontaneous abortion (20% of cases)
- ectopic pregnancy (2% of cases)
- normal-term pregnancy (20–30% of cases)
- hyperemesis gravidarum

Rarely, choriocarcinoma occurs in primary locations other than the placenta; very rarely, it occurs in the testicles. Although trophoblastic components are common components of mixed germ cell tumors, pure choriocarcinoma of the adult testis is rare. Pure choriocarcinoma of the testis represents the most aggressive pathologic variant of germ cell tumors in adults, characteristically with early hematogenous and lymphatic metastatic spread. Because of early spread and inherent resistance to anticancer drugs, patients have a poor prognosis. Elements of choriocarcinoma in a mixed testicular tumor have no prognostic importance.

Choriocarcinomas can also occur in the ovaries and other organs.

== Pathology ==
A characteristic feature is the identification of intimately related syncytiotrophoblasts and cytotrophoblasts without the formation of definite placental type villi. Since choriocarcinomas include syncytiotrophoblasts (beta-HCG-producing cells), they cause elevated blood levels of beta-human chorionic gonadotropin.

Syncytiotrophoblasts are large, multi-nucleated cells with eosinophilic cytoplasm. They often surround the cytotrophoblasts, reminiscent of their normal anatomical relationship in chorionic villi. Cytotrophoblasts are polyhedral, mononuclear cells with hyperchromatic nuclei and a clear or pale cytoplasm. Extensive hemorrhage is a common finding.

High magnification

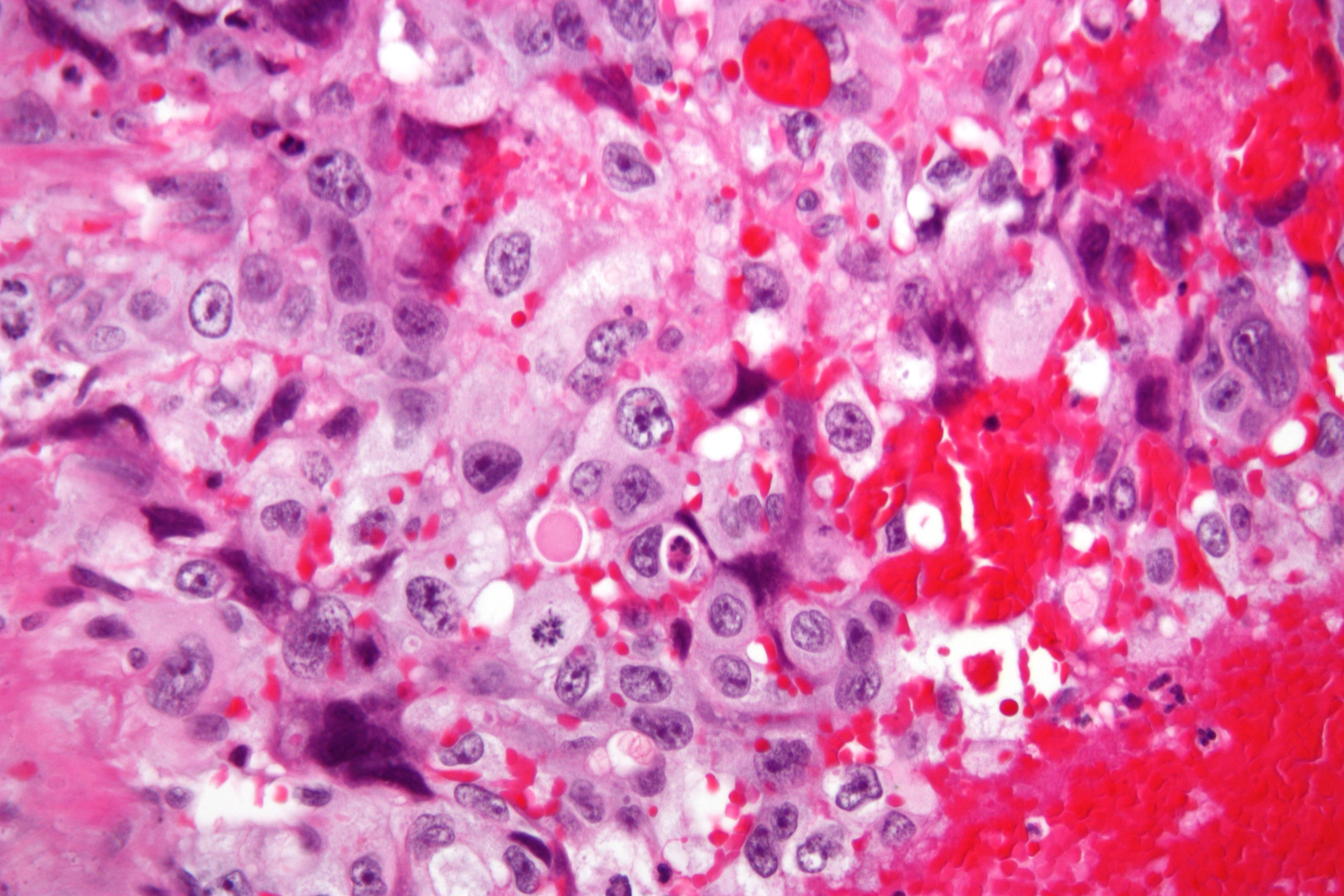
Very high magnification

== Treatment ==
Since gestational choriocarcinoma (which arises from a hydatidiform mole) contains paternal DNA (and thus paternal antigens), it is exquisitely sensitive to chemotherapy. The cure rate, even for metastatic gestational choriocarcinoma, is more than 90% when using chemotherapy for invasive mole and choriocarcinoma.

As of 2019, treatment with either single-agent methotrexate or actinomycin-D is recommended for low-risk disease, while intense combination regimens including EMACO (etoposide, methotrexate, actinomycin D, cyclophosphamide and vincristine (Oncovin) are recommended for intermediate or high-risk disease.

Hysterectomy (surgical removal of the uterus) can also be offered to patients >40 years of age or those for whom sterilisation is not an obstacle. It may be required for those with severe infection and uncontrolled bleeding.

Choriocarcinoma arising in the testicle is rare, malignant, and highly resistant to chemotherapy. The same is true of choriocarcinoma arising in the ovary. Testicular choriocarcinoma has the worst prognosis of all germ-cell cancers.

Stage I choriocarcinoma

Stage 2 choriocarcinoma

Stage 3 choriocarcinoma

Stage 4 choriocarcinoma
