= Doppler velocimetry =

Doppler velocimetry may refer to:

- Laser Doppler velocimetry
- Photon Doppler velocimetry
- Planar Doppler velocimetry
- A Doppler fetal monitor
