= ZNF831 =

Identifiers
- Aliases: ZNF831, C20orf174, dJ492J12.1, zinc finger protein 831
- External IDs: MGI: 3641861; GeneCards: ZNF831

Gene location (Human)
Chr.	Chromosome 20 (human)
Band	20q13.32	Start	59,123,381 bp
Band	20q13.32	End	59,259,113 bp

Gene location (Mouse)
Chr.	Chromosome 2 (mouse)
Band	2|2 H4	Start	174,485,327 bp
Band	2|2 H4	End	174,552,625 bp
RNA expression pattern
Bgee	Human / Mouse (ortholog); Top expressed in: granulocyte; lymph node; testicle; blood; appendix; spleen; bone marrow cell; epithelium of colon; tonsil; prefrontal cortex / Top expressed in: granulocyte; dentate gyrus of hippocampal formation granule cell; visual cortex; hippocampus proper; spleen; primary visual cortex; superior frontal gyrus; striatum of neuraxis; olfactory bulb; bone marrow; More reference expression data
BioGPS	n/a
Gene ontology
Molecular function	sequence-specific DNA binding; metal ion binding; nucleic acid binding; DNA-binding transcription repressor activity, RNA polymerase II-specific
Cellular component	nucleus
Biological process	multicellular organism development; transcription by RNA polymerase II; signal transduction; negative regulation of transcription by RNA polymerase II
Sources:Amigo / QuickGO
Orthologs
Databases	NCBI: entry; OMA: entry
Species	Human	Mouse
Entrez	128611	100043757
Ensembl	ENSG00000124203	ENSMUSG00000050600
UniProt	Q5JPB2	A2ADM8
RefSeq (mRNA)	NM_178457; NM_001384354	NM_001099328
RefSeq (protein)	NP_848552	NP_001092798
Location (UCSC)	Chr 20: 59.12 – 59.26 Mb	Chr 2: 174.49 – 174.55 Mb
PubMed search
- Wikidata
View/Edit Human	View/Edit Mouse

Zinc finger protein 831 is a protein that in humans is encoded by the ZNF831 gene.
