= Trophoblast =

Early embryonic structure that gives rise to the placenta

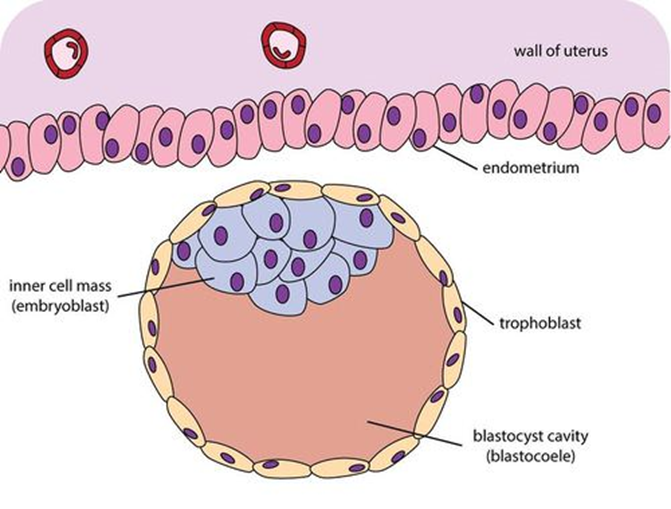
- Blastocyst with an inner cell mass and trophoblast.

Details
- Days: 6
- Gives rise to: Caul

Identifiers
- Latin: trophoblastus; massa cellularis externa
- MeSH: D014327
- TE: E6.0.1.1.2.0.2
- FMA: 83029

The trophoblast (from Greek trephein: to feed; and blastos: germinator) derives from the trophectoderm, the outer layer of epithelial cells of the blastocyst.

The trophectoderm is a temporary layer of cells. At the beginning of implantation, on attachment to the endometrium, the cells undergo the process of epithelial–mesenchymal transition allowing invasion of the embryo. The cells are then known as the trophoblast, needed for the formation of much of the placenta.

Trophoblasts are present four days after fertilization in humans. As part of the placenta they provide nutrients to the embryo. They form during implantation, the first stage of pregnancy and are the first cells to differentiate from the fertilized egg to become extraembryonic structures that do not directly contribute to the embryo. In the blastocyst the trophoblast is contiguous with the ectoderm of the embryo and is referred to as the trophectoderm. After the first differentiation, the cells in the human embryo lose their totipotency because they can no longer form a trophoblast. They become pluripotent stem cells.

== Structure ==
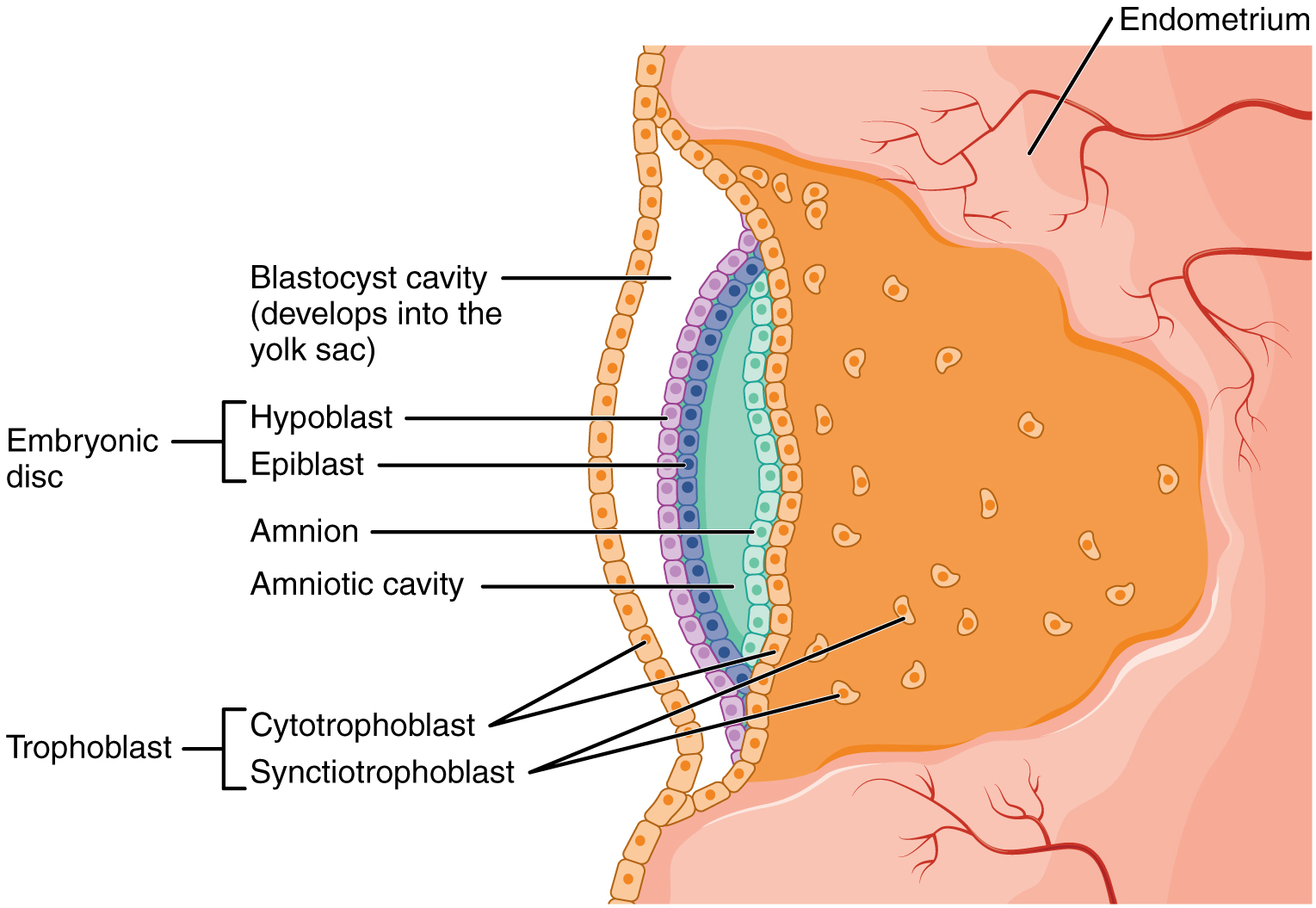
Image showing trophoblast differentiated into the two layers of cytotrophoblast and syncytiotrophoblast during implantation

The trophoblast proliferates and differentiates into two cell layers at approximately six days after fertilization for humans.

| Layer | Location | Description |
|---|---|---|
| Cytotrophoblast | The inner layer | A single-celled inner layer of the trophoblast. |
| Syncytiotrophoblast | The outer layer | A thick layer that lacks cell boundaries and grows into the endometrial stroma. It secretes hCG in order to maintain progesterone secretion and sustain a pregnancy. |
| Intermediate trophoblast (IT) | The implantation site, chorion, villi (dependent on subtype) | An anchor placenta (implantation site IT). |

== Function ==
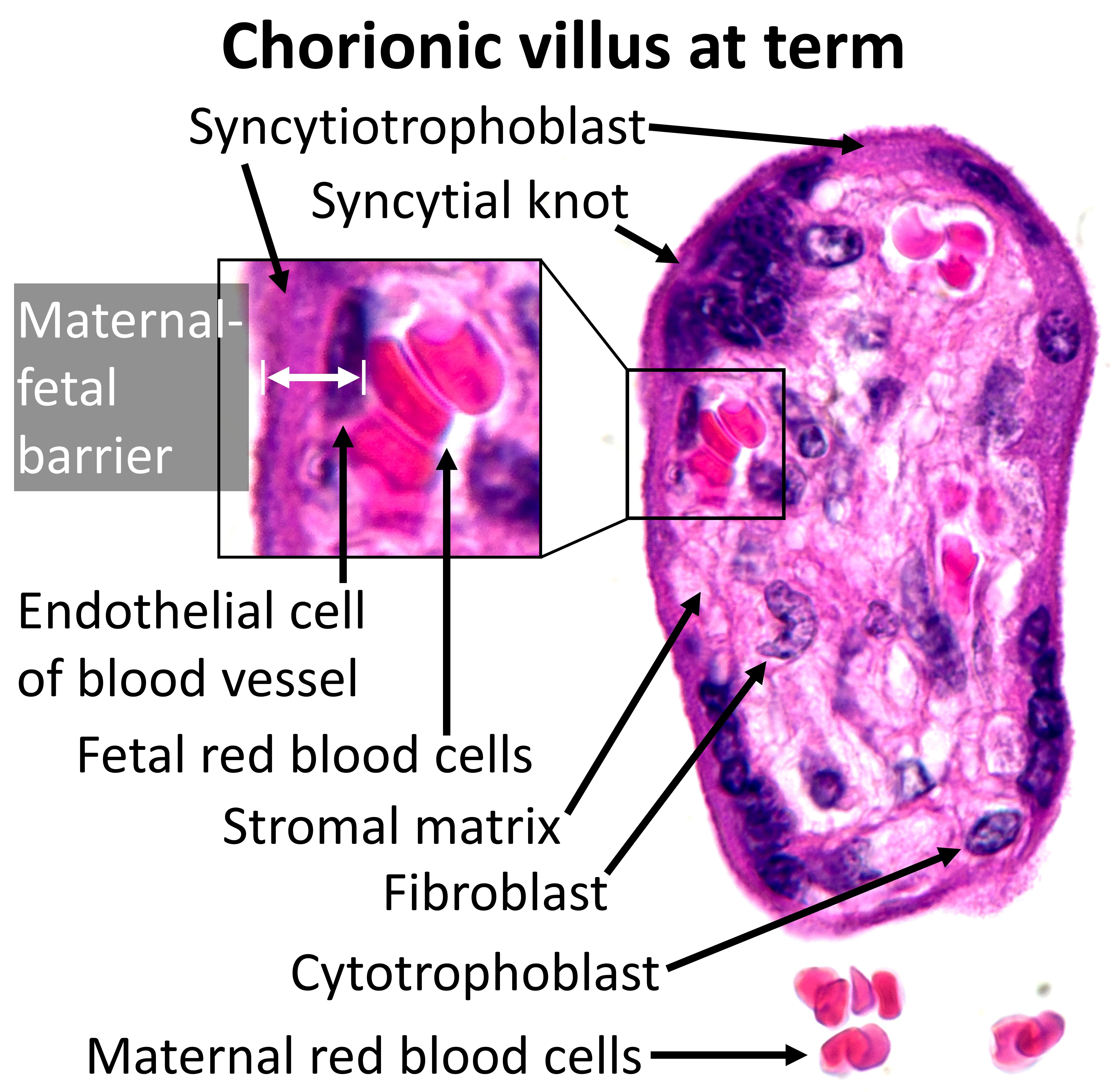
High-magnification H&E micrograph of a chorionic villus at term, showing its coverage by a continuous multinucleated syncytiotrophoblast. A cytotrophoblast is labeled at bottom right; cytotrophoblasts are sparse and discontinuous at term.

Trophoblasts are specialized cells of the placenta that play an important role in embryo implantation and interaction with the decidualized maternal uterus. The core of placental villi contain mesenchymal cells and placental blood vessels that are directly connected to the fetus’ circulation via the umbilical cord. This core is surrounded by two layers of trophoblasts, the cytotrophoblast and the syncytiotrophoblast. The cytotrophoblast is a layer of mono-nucleated cells that resides underneath the syncytiotrophoblast. The syncytiotrophoblast is composed of fused cytotrophoblasts which then form a layer that covers the placental surface. The syncytiotrophoblast is in direct contact with the maternal blood that reaches the placental surface. It then facilitates the exchange of nutrients, wastes and gases between the maternal and fetal systems.

In addition, cytotrophoblasts in the tips of villi can differentiate into another type of trophoblast called the extravillous trophoblast. Extravillous trophoblasts grow out from the placenta and penetrate into the decidualized uterus. This process is essential not only for physically attaching the placenta to the mother, but also for altering the vasculature in the uterus. This alteration allows an adequate blood supply to the growing fetus as pregnancy progresses. Some of these trophoblasts even replace the endothelial cells in the uterine spiral arteries as they remodel these vessels into wide bore conduits that are independent of maternal vasoconstriction. This ensures that the fetus receives a steady supply of blood, and the placenta is not subjected to fluctuations in oxygen that could cause it damage.

== Clinical significance ==
The invasion of a specific type of trophoblast (extravillous trophoblast) into the maternal uterus is a vital stage in the establishment of pregnancy. Failure of the trophoblast to invade sufficiently is important in the development of some cases of pre-eclampsia. Invasion of the trophoblast too deeply may cause conditions such as placenta accreta, placenta increta, or placenta percreta.

Gestational trophoblastic disease is a pregnancy-associated concept, forming from the villous and extravillous trophoblast cells in the placenta.

Choriocarcinoma are trophoblastic tumors that form in the uterus from villous cells.

Trophoblast stem cells (TSCs) are cells that can regenerate and they are similar to embryonic stem cells (ESCs) in the fact that they come from early on in the trophoblast lifetime. In the placenta, these stem cells are able to differentiate into any trophoblast cell because they are pluripotent.

== Additional images ==
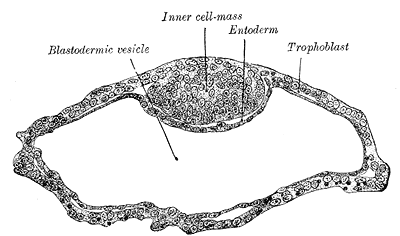
Blastodermic vesicle of Vespertilio murinus.

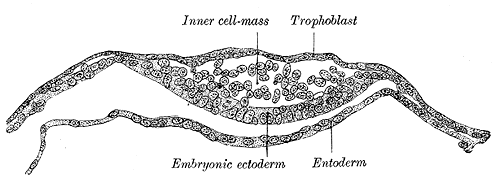
Section through embryonic disk of Vespertilio murinus.

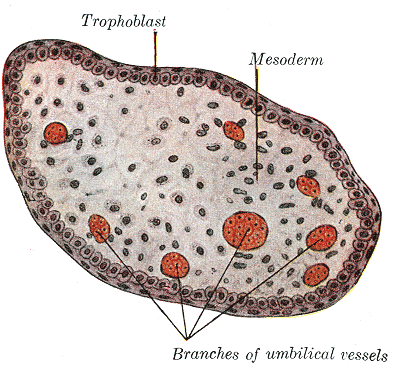
Transverse section of a chorionic villus.

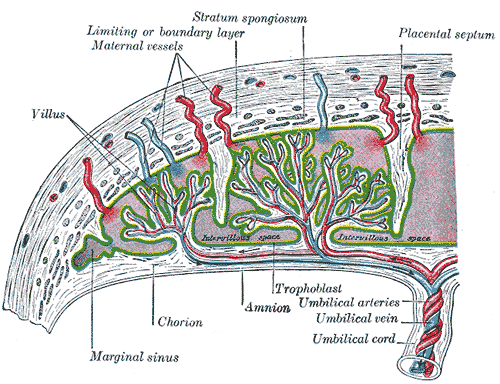
Scheme of placental circulation.

The initial stages of human embryogenesis

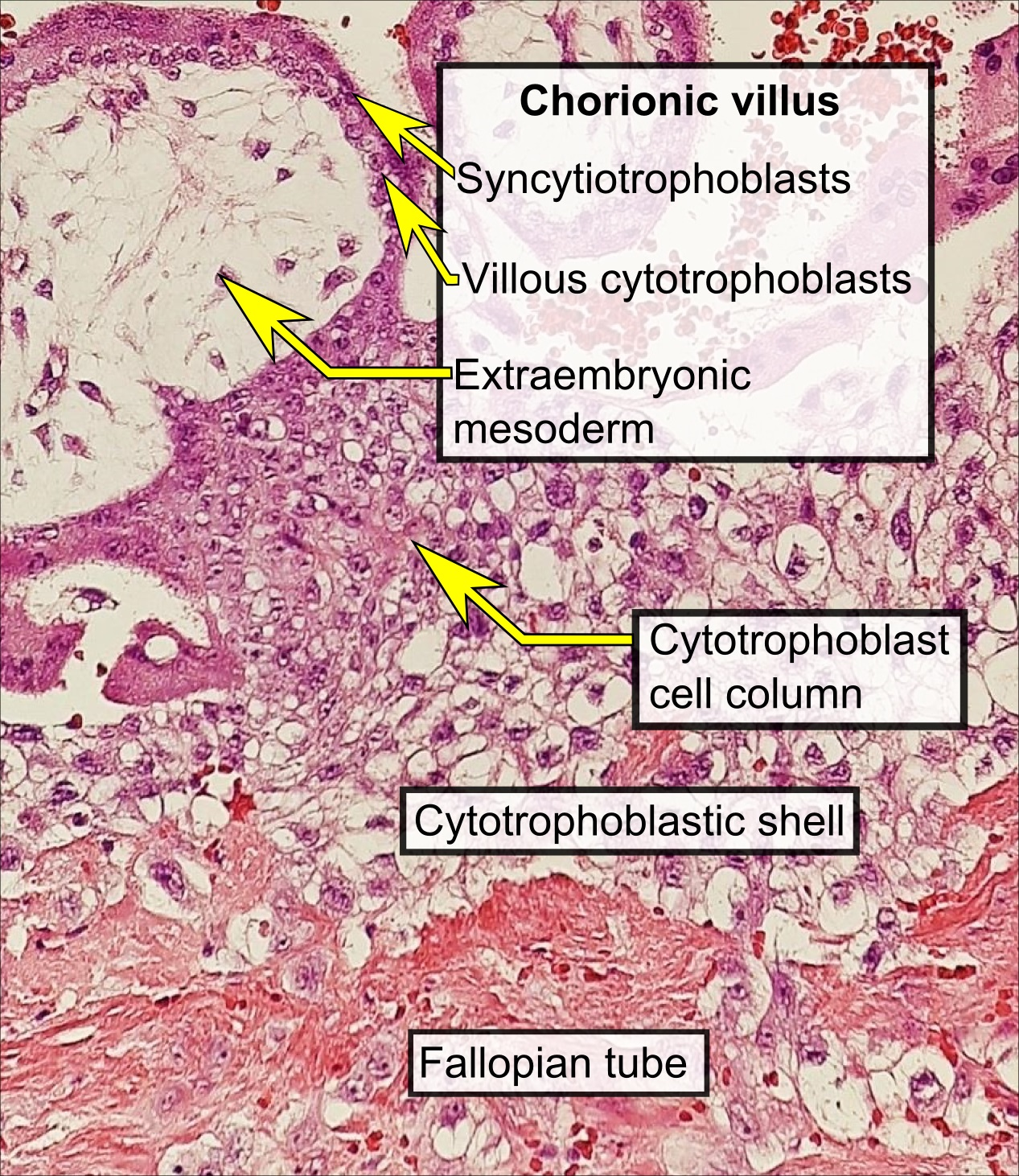
Histopathology of a chorionic villus, in a tubal pregnancy, with labeled cytotrophoblasts and syncytiotrophoblasts.

== See also ==
- Syncytiotrophoblast
- Hydatidiform mole
