= Syncytiotrophoblast =

Embryonic cell of the placental surface

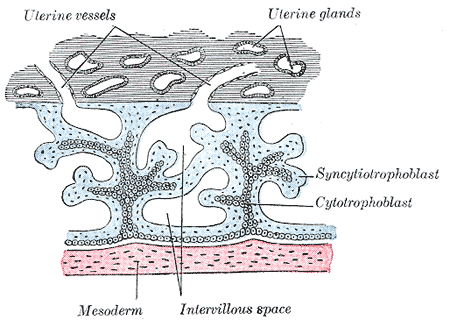
- Primary chorionic villi. Diagrammatic.

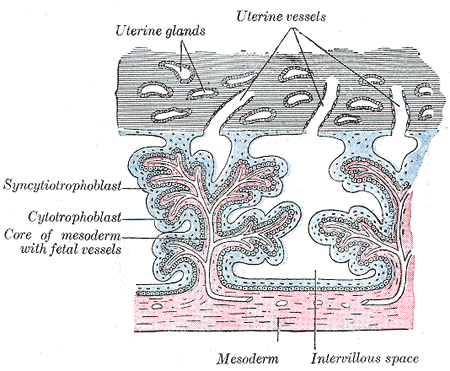
- Secondary chorionic villi. Diagrammatic.

Details
- Carnegie stage: 5a
- Days: 8

Identifiers
- Latin: syncitiotrophoblastus
- TE: E6.0.1.1.4.0.2
- FMA: 83040

The syncytiotrophoblast (from the Greek 'syn'- "together"; 'cytio'- "of cells"; 'tropho'- "nutrition"; 'blast'- "bud") is the epithelial covering of the highly vascular embryonic placental villi, which invades the wall of the uterus to establish nutrient circulation between the embryo and the mother. It is a multinucleate, terminally differentiated syncytium, extending to 13 cm.

== Function ==
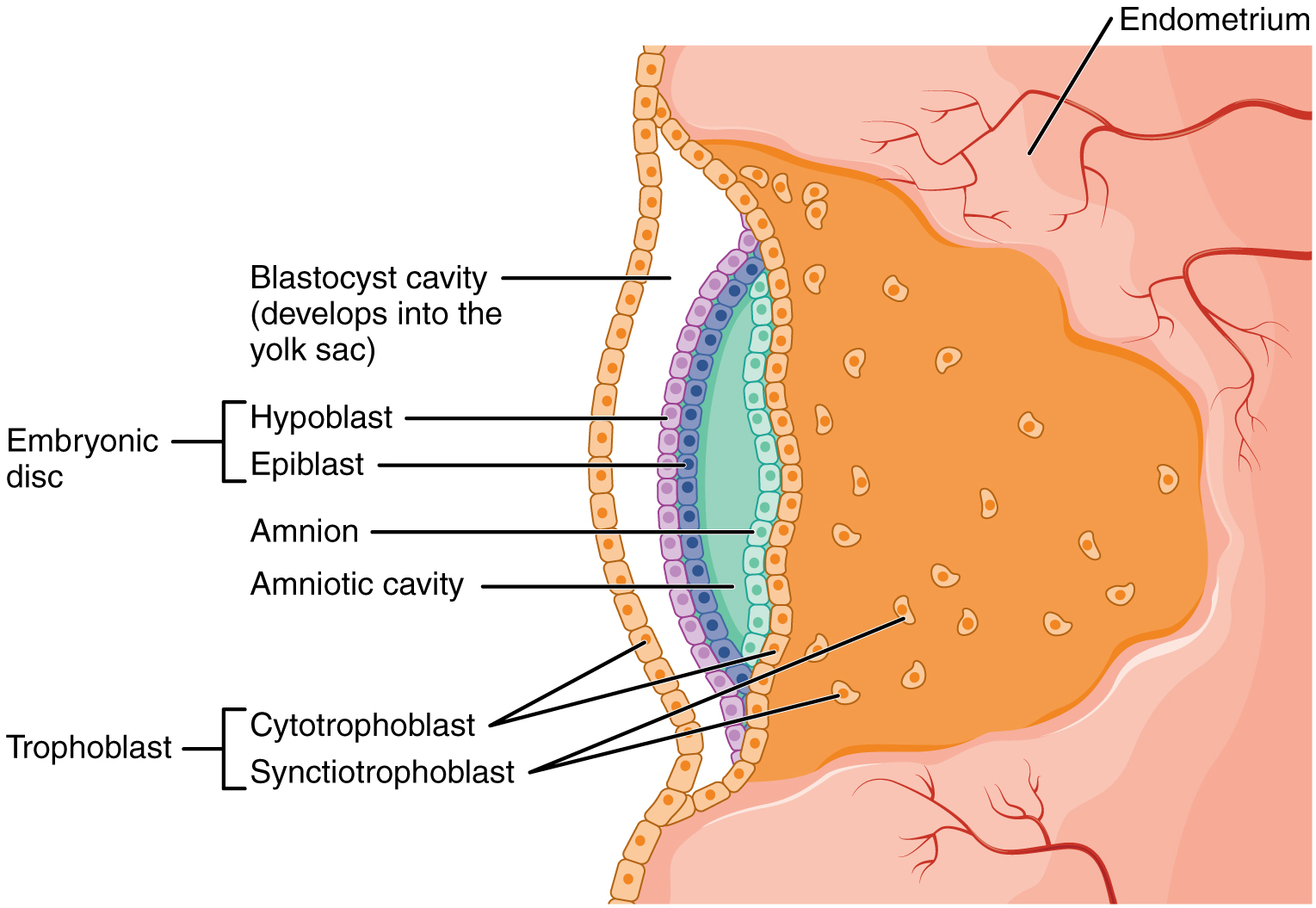
Image showing trophoblast differentiated into the two layers of cytotrophoblast and syncytiotrophoblast during implantation

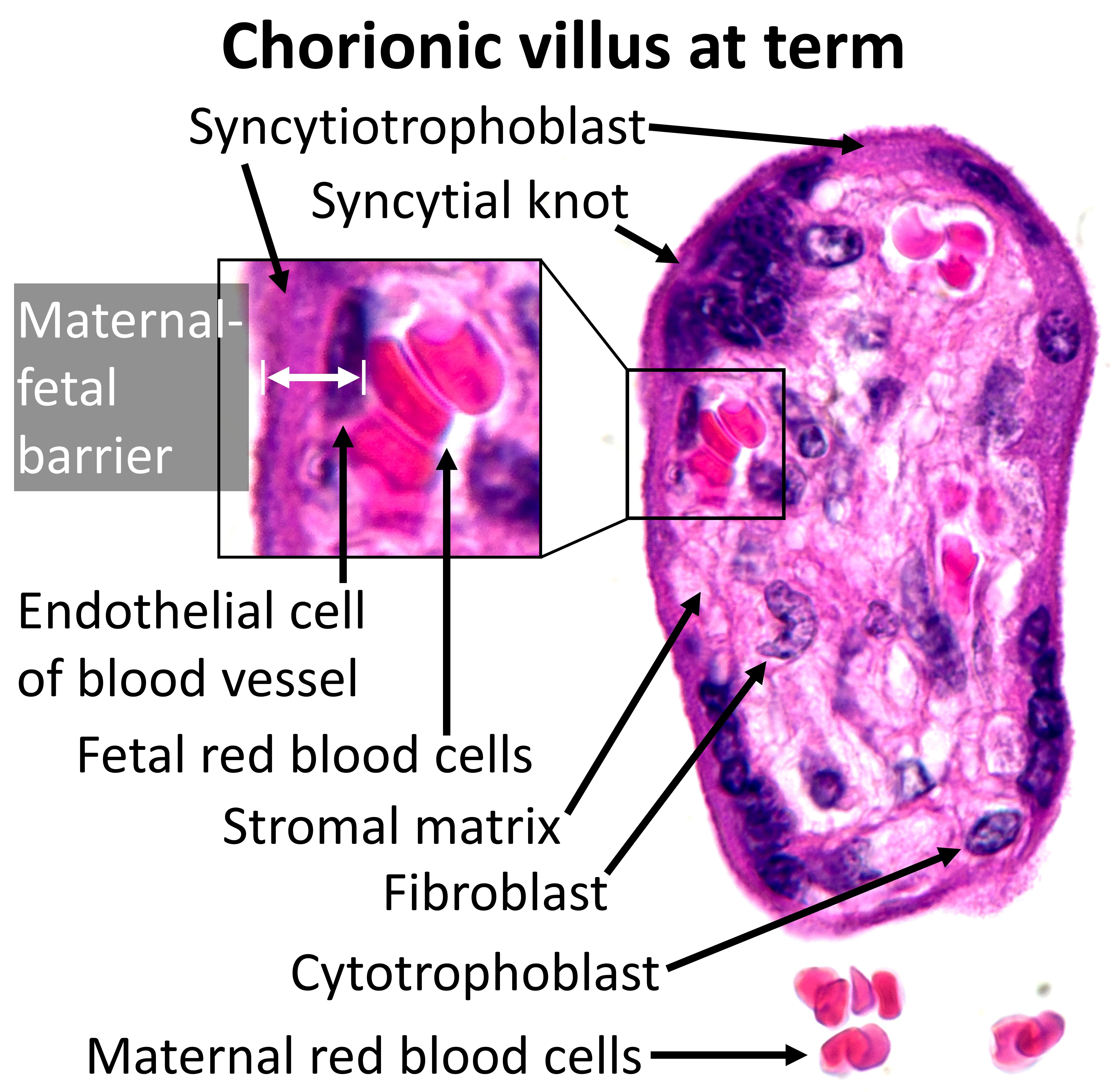
High-magnification H&E micrograph of a chorionic villus at term, showing its coverage by a continuous multinucleated syncytiotrophoblast, including a focal aggregation of syncytial nuclei termed a syncytial knot. A cytotrophoblast is labeled at bottom right; cytotrophoblasts are sparse and discontinuous at term and may be difficult to identify.

The syncytiotrophoblast is the outer layer of the trophoblasts and actively invades the uterine wall during implantation, rupturing maternal capillaries and thus establishing an interface between maternal blood and embryonic extracellular fluid, facilitating passive exchange of material between the mother and the embryo.

The syncytial property is important since the mother's immune system includes white blood cells that are able to migrate into tissues by "squeezing" in between cells. If they were to reach the fetal side of the placenta, many foreign proteins would be recognized, triggering an immune reaction. However the syncytium acts as a giant cell so there are no gaps for immune cells to migrate through.

One way in which it accomplishes this task is by suppressing the expression of immunity-related genes HLA-A and HLA-B, which are classically known to be expressed by all nucleated cells. These genes normally express the MHC-I ligand that acts as a major binding mechanism for T-cells. By decreasing the translation of these gene products, the syncytiotrophoblast reduces the chances of an attack by the maternal immune system mediated by T-cells.

The syncytiotrophoblast secretes progesterone and leptin in addition to human chorionic gonadotropin (hCG) and human placental lactogen (HPL). hCG prevents degeneration of the corpus luteum, and signals the corpus luteum to continue progesterone secretion. From this point on, the corpus luteum is called the corpus luteum graviditatis. Progesterone serves to maintain the integrity of the uterine lining and, until the syncytiotrophoblast is mature enough to secrete enough progesterone to support pregnancy (in the fourth month of embryonic development), it is aided by the corpus luteum graviditatis.

== Formation ==
The syncytiotrophoblast lacks proliferative capacity and instead is maintained by fusion of underlying cytotrophoblast cells. This fusion is assisted by syncytin, a protein that was integrated into mammalian genomes from an endogenous retrovirus.

== Additional images ==
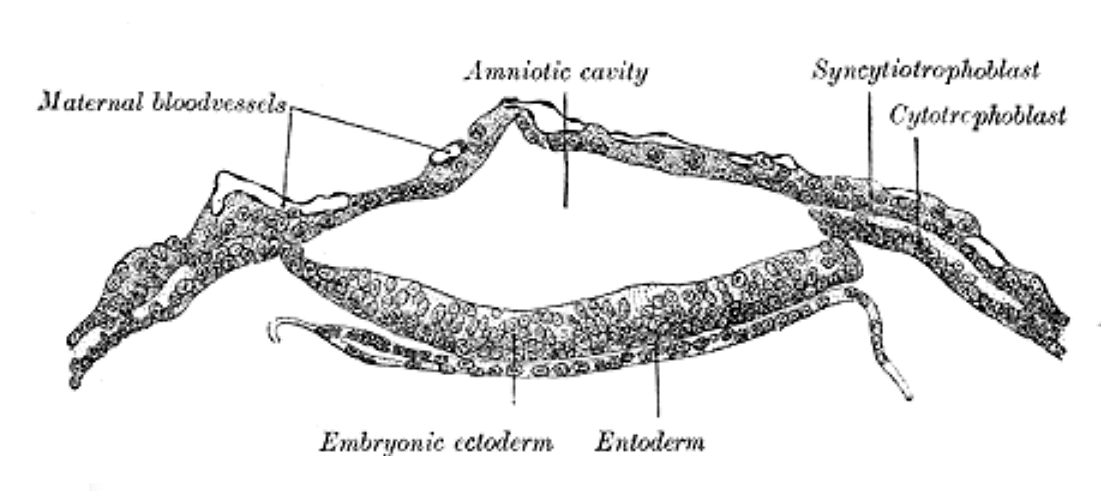
Section through embryonic area of Vespertilio murinus to show the formation of the amniotic cavity.

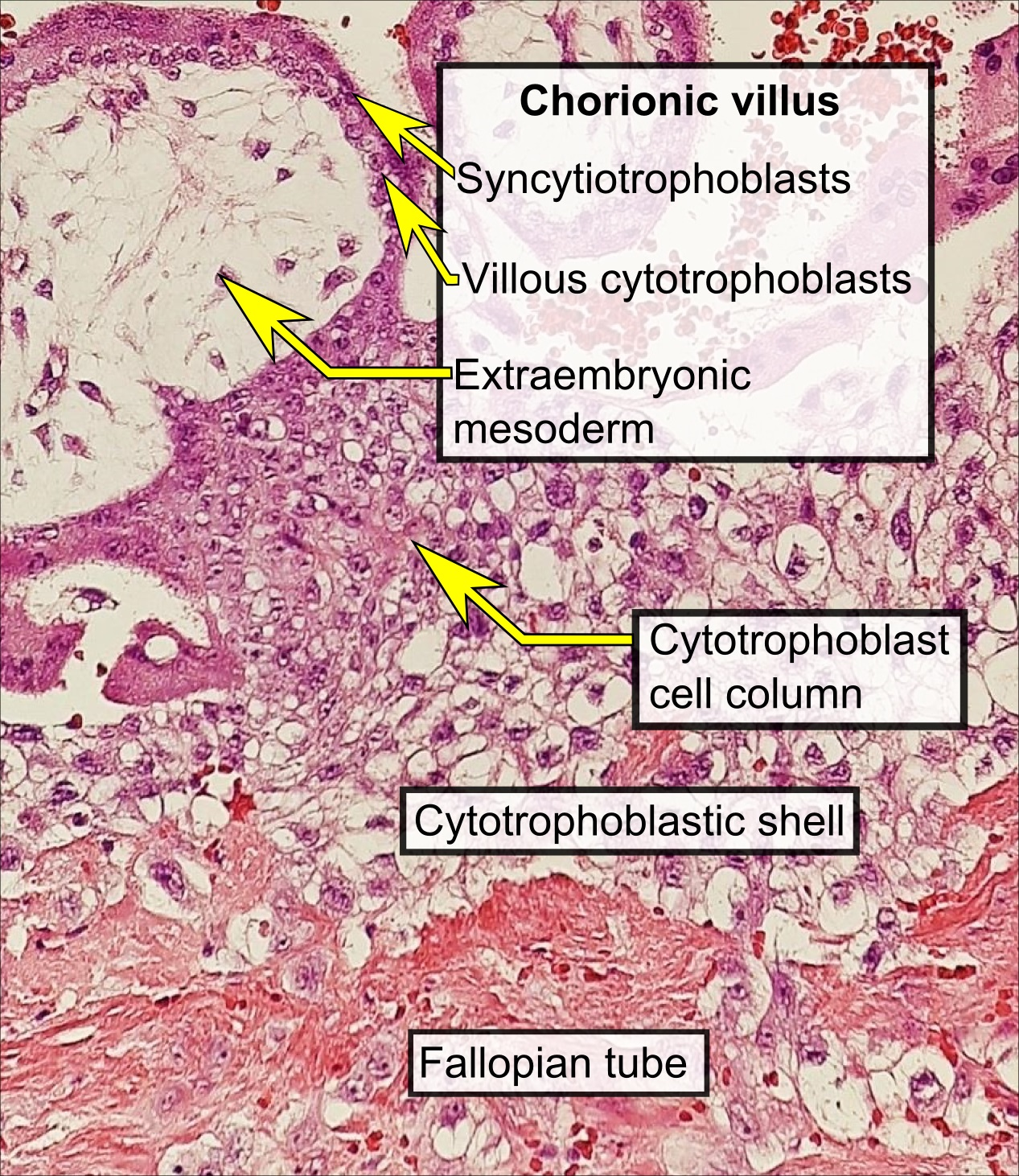
Histopathology of a chorionic villus, in a tubal pregnancy

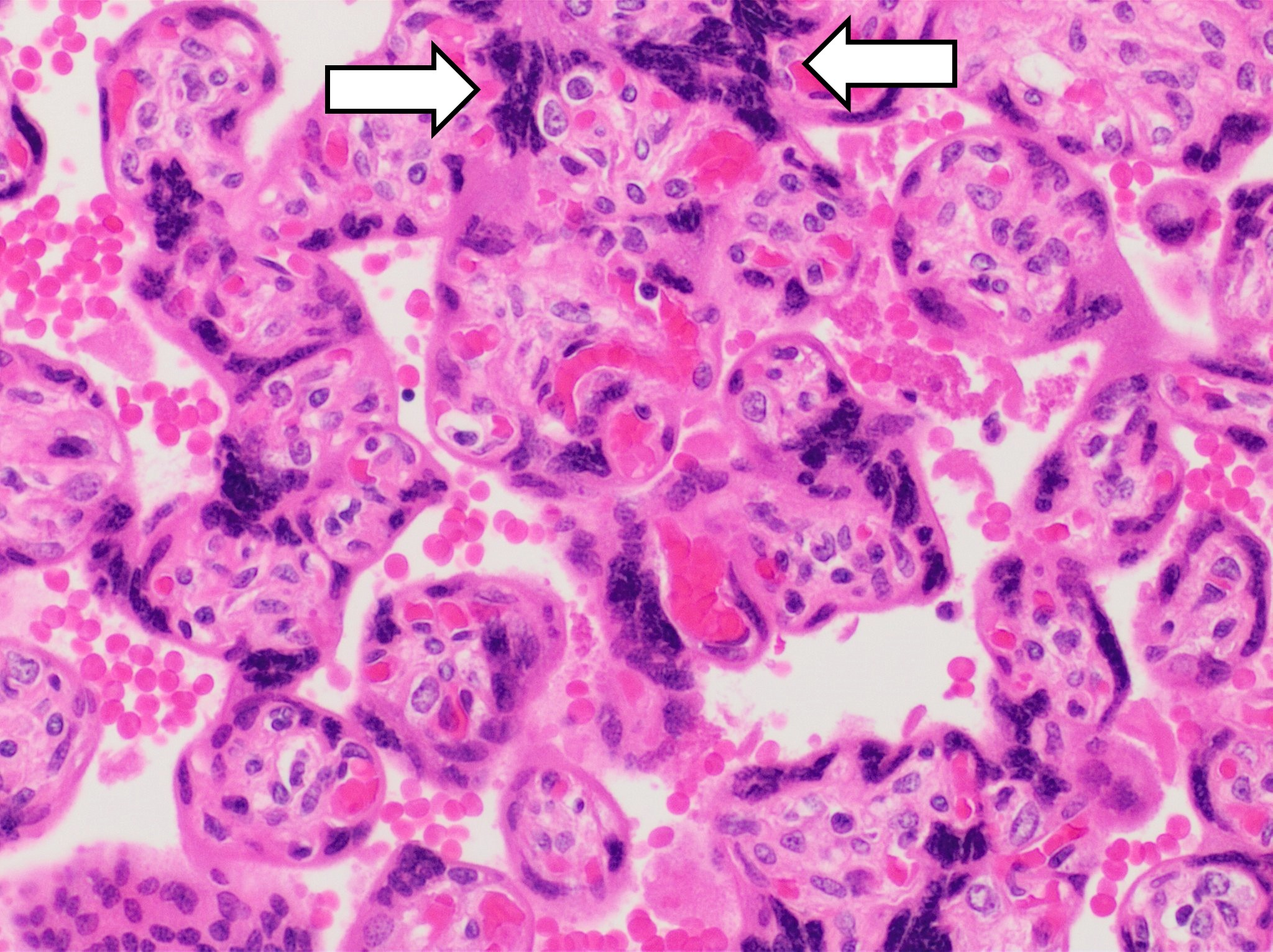
Histopathology of placenta with increased syncytial knotting of chorionic villi, with two knots pointed out.

== See also ==
- Cytotrophoblast
- Intermediate trophoblast
- Syncytium
