= Cytotrophoblast =

Layer of an embryo

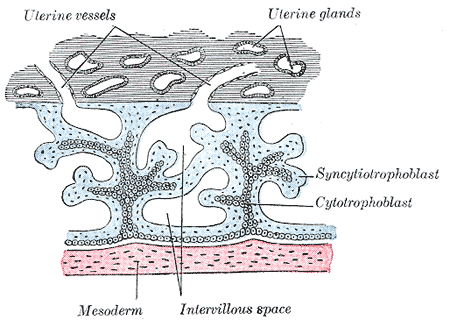
- Primary chorionic villi. Diagrammatic.

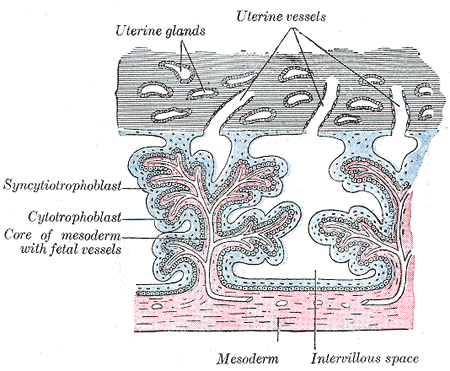
- Secondary chorionic villi. Diagrammatic.

Details
- Carnegie stage: 5a
- Days: 8

Identifiers
- Latin: cytotrophoblastus
- TE: E6.0.1.1.4.0.5
- FMA: 83042 83039, 83042

Cytotrophoblast is both the inner layer of the trophoblast (also called layer of Langhans) and the cells that live there. It is interior to the syncytiotrophoblast and external to the wall of the blastocyst in a developing embryo.

The cytotrophoblast is considered to be the trophoblastic stem cell because the layer surrounding the blastocyst remains while daughter cells differentiate and proliferate to function in multiple roles. There are two lineages that cytotrophoblastic cells may differentiate through: fusion and invasive. The fusion lineage yields syncytiotrophoblast and the invasive lineage yields interstitial cytotrophoblast cells.

Cytotrophoblastic cells play an important role in the implantation of an embryo in the uterus.

== Fusion lineage ==
The formation of all syncytiotrophoblast is from the fusion of two or more cytotrophoblasts via this fusion pathway. This pathway is important because the syncytiotrophoblast plays an important role in fetal-maternal gas exchange, nutrient exchange, and immunological and metabolic functions.

An undifferentiated cytotrophoblastic stem cell will differentiate into a villous cytotrophoblast, which is what constitutes primary chorionic villi, and will eventually coalesce into villous syncytiotrophoblast. The formation of syncytiotrophoblast from cytotrophoblast is a terminal differentiation step of trophoblastic cells.

Syncytialization of cytotrophoblastic cells can be induced in vitro through multiple signalling molecules including epidermal growth factor, glucocorticoids, and human chorionic gonadotropin.

== Invasive lineage ==
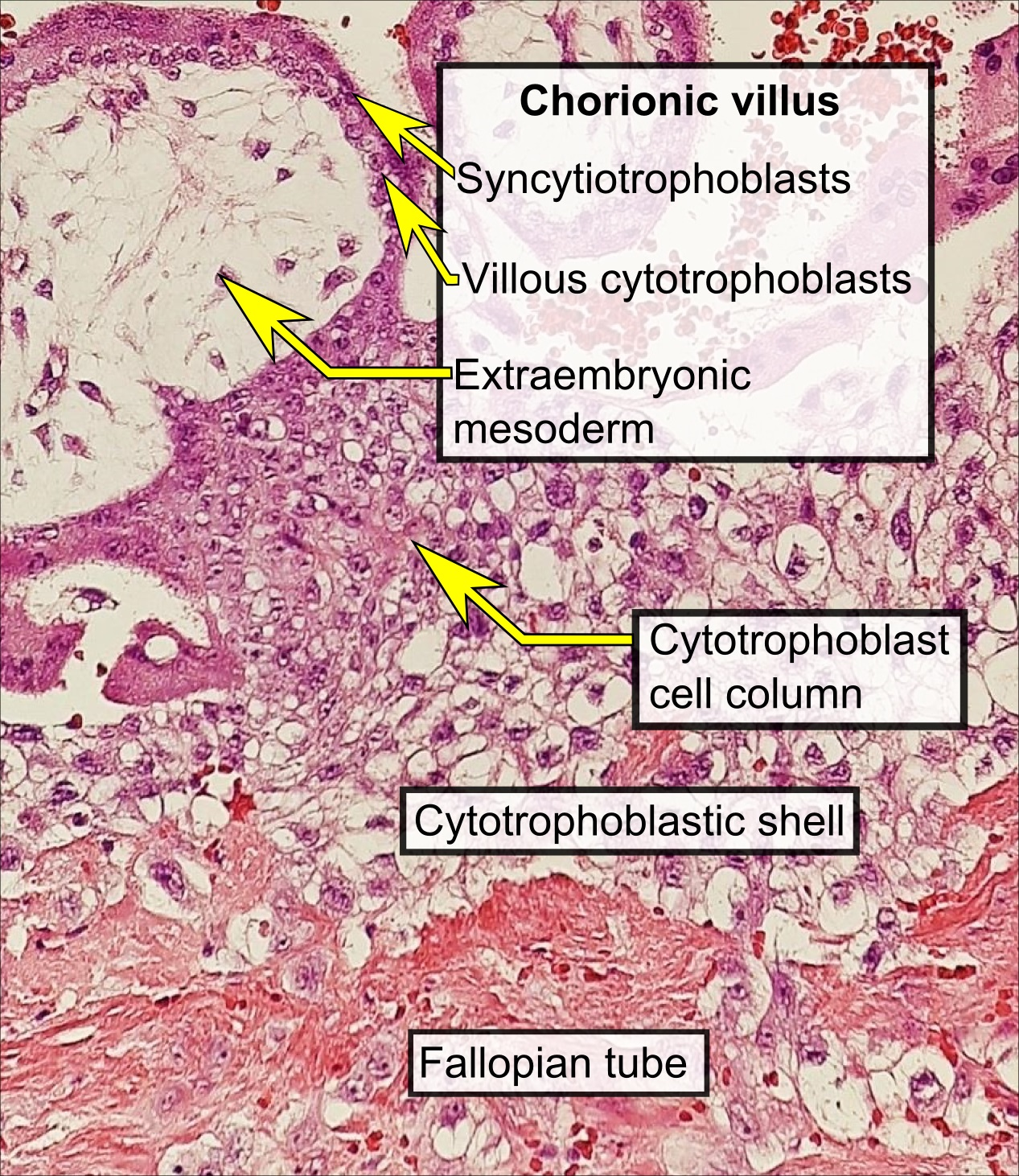
Histopathology of a chorionic villus, in a tubal pregnancy.

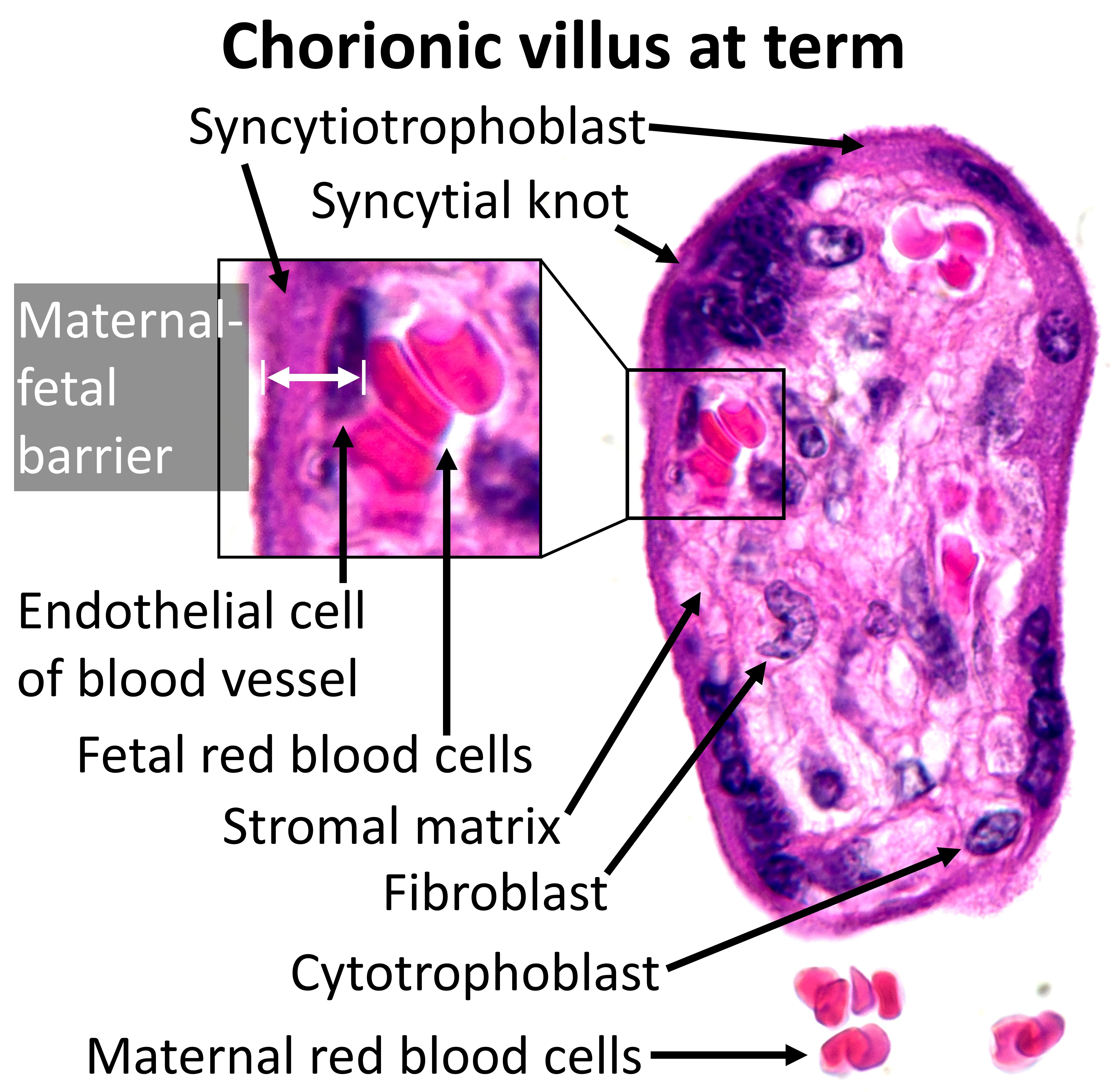
High-magnification H&E micrograph of a chorionic villus at term. A cytotrophoblast cell is labeled near bottom, being characteristically located in the periphery, juxtaposed to syncytiotrophoblast that surrounds the villus. Cytotrophoblasts are sparse and discontinuous at term and may be difficult to identify.

The invasive lineage creates cytotrophoblasts that are essential in the process of implantation and forming a fully functional placenta. An undifferentiated cytotrophoblastic stem cell will differentiate into an extravillous cytotrophoblast intermediate and then into an interstitial cytotrophoblast. An interstitial cytotrophoblast may then further differentiate into an endovascular cytotrophoblast or form a syncytium.

=== Interstitial cytotrophoblast ===
The primary function of an interstitial cytotrophoblast is to anchor the growing fetus to the maternal uterine tissue. These cells may invade the whole endometrium and the proximal third of the myometrium.

Once these cells penetrate through the first few layers of cells of the decidua, they lose their ability to proliferate and become invasive. This departure from the cell cycle seems to be due to factors such as TGF-β and decorin. Although these invasive interstitial cytotrophoblasts can no longer divide, they retain their ability to form syncytia. Multinucleated giant cells (small syncytia) are found in the placental bed and myometrium as a result of the fusion of interstitial cytotrophoblasts.

Interstitial cytotrophoblasts may also transform into endovascular cytotrophoblasts.

=== Endovascular cytotrophoblast ===
The primary function of the endovascular cytotrophoblast is to penetrate maternal spiral arteries and route the blood flow through the placenta for the growing embryo to use.

They arise from interstitial cytotrophoblasts from the process of phenocopying. This changes the phenotype of these cells from epithelial to endothelial. Endovascular cytotrophoblasts, like their interstitial predecessor, are non-proliferating and invasive.

== Role in implantation ==
Proper cytotrophoblast function is essential in the implantation of a blastocyst. After hatching, the embryonic pole of the blastocyst faces the uterine endometrium. Once they make contact the trophoblast begins to rapidly proliferate. The cytotrophoblast secretes proteolytic enzymes to break down the extracellular matrix between the endometrial cells to allow finger-like projections of trophoblast to penetrate through. Projections of cytotrophoblast and syncytiotrophoblast pull the embryo into the endometrium until it is fully covered by endometrial epithelium, save for the coagulation plug.

== Associated disorders ==
The most common associated disorder is pre-eclampsia, affecting approximately 7% of all births. It is characterized by a failure of the cytotrophoblast to invade the uterus and its vasculature, specifically the spiral arteries that the endovascular cytotrophoblast should invade. The result of this is decreased blood flow to the fetus which may cause intrauterine growth restriction. Clinical symptoms of pre-eclampsia in the mother are most commonly high blood pressure, proteinuria and edema.

Conversely, if there is too much invasion of uterine tissue by the trophoblast then a hydatidiform mole or choriocarcinoma may arise.

== Additional images ==
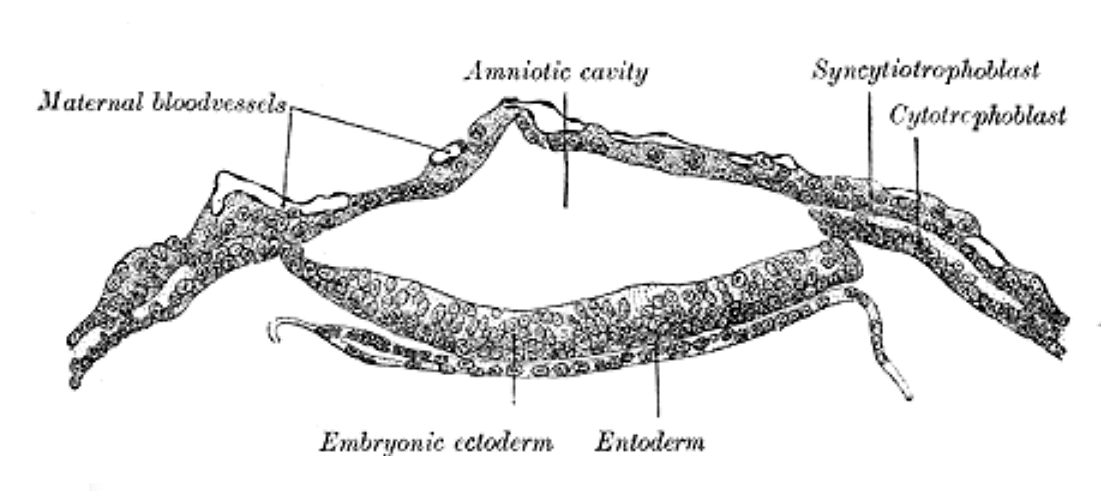
Section through embryonic area of Vespertilio murinus to show the formation of the amniotic cavity.
