= Spiral artery =

Small arteries which temporarily supply blood to the endometrium of the uterus

Uterine arterial vasculature, showing spiral arteries at right.

Spiral arteries are small arteries which temporarily supply blood to the endometrium of the uterus during the luteal phase of the menstrual cycle.

In histology, identifying the presence of these arteries is one of the most useful techniques in identifying the phase of the cycle.

The spiral arteries are converted for uteroplacental blood flow during pregnancy, involving:

- Loss of smooth muscle and elastic lamina from the vessel wall.
- 5-10 fold dilation at the mouth of the vessel.

Failure of the physiological conversion of the spiral arteries can cause a number of complications, including intrauterine growth restriction and pre-eclampsia.
