= Pregnancy test =

Test based on scientific data to determine if a person is pregnant

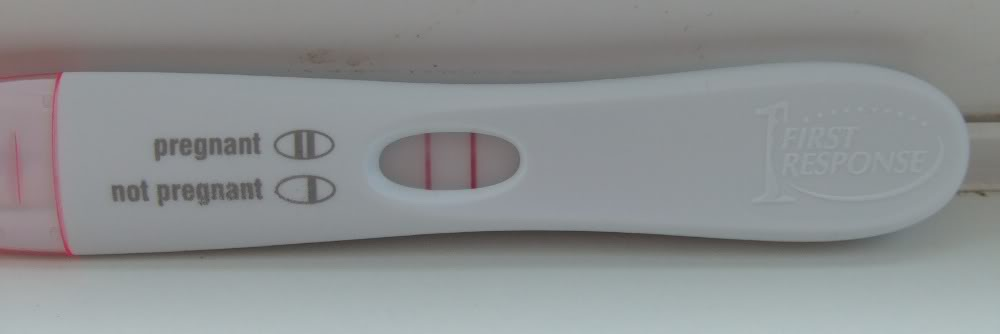
A modern hormone pregnancy test, showing a positive result

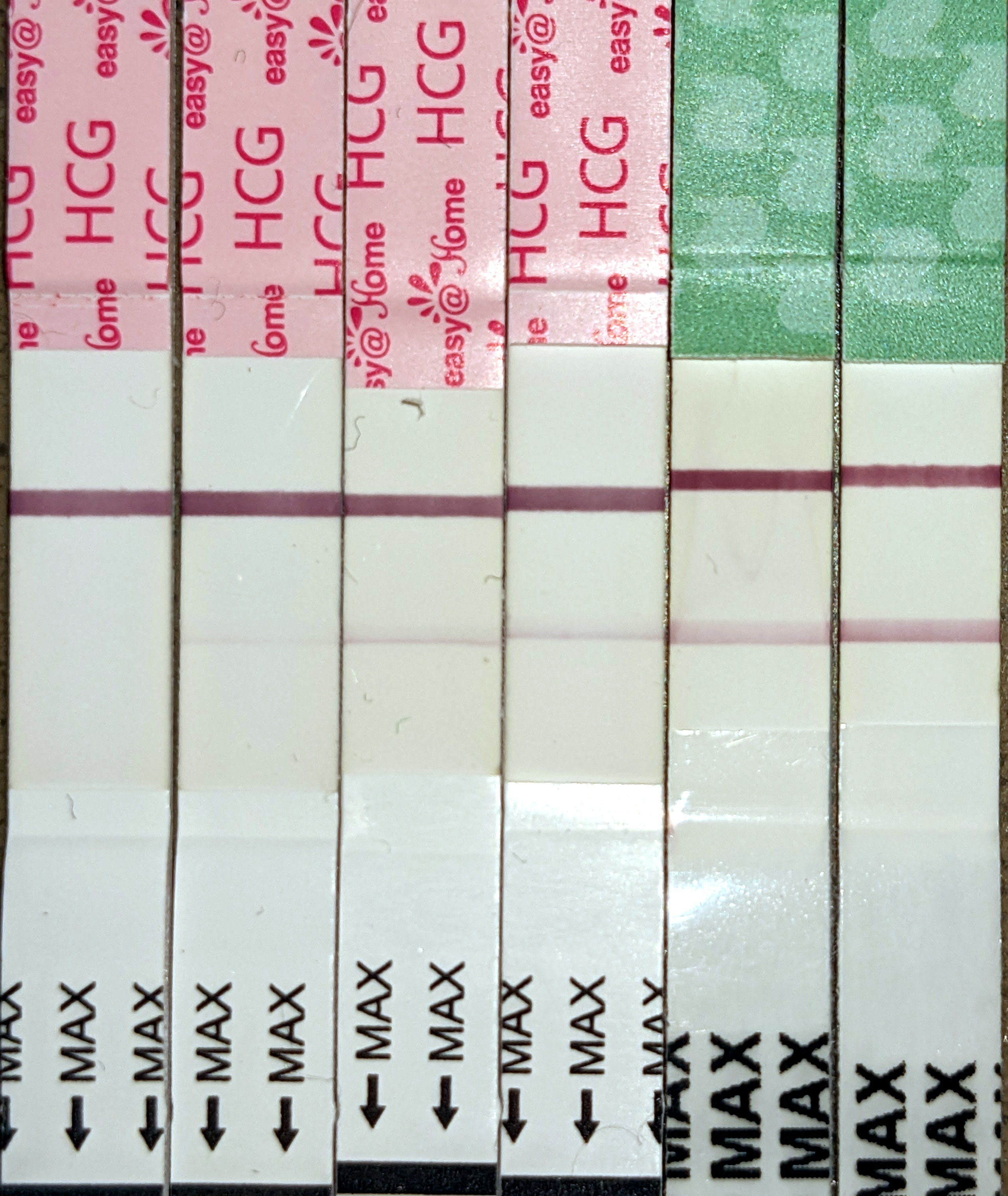
A series of pregnancy test strips, taken one per day at the beginning of a pregnancy

A pregnancy test is used to determine whether a woman is pregnant or not. The two primary methods are testing for the pregnancy hormone (human chorionic gonadotropin (hCG)) in blood or urine using a pregnancy test kit, and scanning with ultrasonography. Testing blood for hCG results in the earliest detection of pregnancy. Almost all pregnant women will have a positive urine pregnancy test one week after the first day of a missed menstrual period.

== Types ==
=== Human chorionic gonadotropin (hCG) ===
This image depicts how the hormone hCG, produced by pregnant women's placentas, is detected in urine pregnancy tests to indicate a positive result.

Identified in the early 20th century, human chorionic gonadotropin (hCG) is a glycoprotein hormone that rises quickly in the first few weeks of pregnancy, typically reaching a peak at 8- to 10-weeks gestational age. hCG is produced by what will become the placenta. hCG testing can be performed with a blood (serum) sample (typically done in a medical facility) or with urine (which can be performed in a medical facility or at home). The assays used to detect the presence of hCG in blood or urine are generally reliable and inexpensive. Secretion of hCG can occur as soon as 6 days following ovulation and on average 8–10 days following ovulation; this is the earliest hCG can be detected in a blood sample. The hCG concentration in blood is higher than in urine. Therefore, a blood test can be positive while the urine test is still negative.

Qualitative tests (yes/no or positive/negative results) look for the presence of the beta subunit of human chorionic gonadotropin in blood or urine. For a qualitative test the thresholds for a positive test are generally determined by an hCG cut-off where at least 95% of pregnant women would get a positive result on the day of their first missed period. Qualitative urine pregnancy tests vary in sensitivity. High-sensitivity tests are more common and typically detect hCG levels between 20 and 50 milli-international units/mL (mIU/mL). Low-sensitivity tests detect hCG levels between 1500 and 2000 mIU/mL and have unique clinical applications, including confirmation of medication abortion success. Qualitative urine tests available for home use are typically designed as lateral flow tests.

Quantitative tests measure the exact amount of hCG in the sample. Blood tests can detect hCG levels as low as 1 mIU/mL, and typically clinicians will diagnose a positive pregnancy test at 5mIU/mL.

Table 1. Human chorionic gonadotropin (hCG) detection thresholds by test type and sample type
	Urine pregnancy test	Blood pregnancy test
Detection thresholds	High-sensitivity: Qualitative test: 20 to 50 mIU/mL, depending on test Low-sensitivity: Qualitative test: 1500-2000 mIU/mL, depending on test	Qualitative test: 5 to 10 mIU/mL, depending on test Quantitative test: 1 to 2 mIU/mL for an ultrasensitive test

There is a multilevel urine pregnancy test (MLPT) that measures hCG levels semiquantitatively. The hCG levels are measured at <25, 25 to 99, 100 to 499, 500 to 1999, 2000 to 9999, and >10,000 mIU/mL. This test has utility for determining the success of medication abortion.

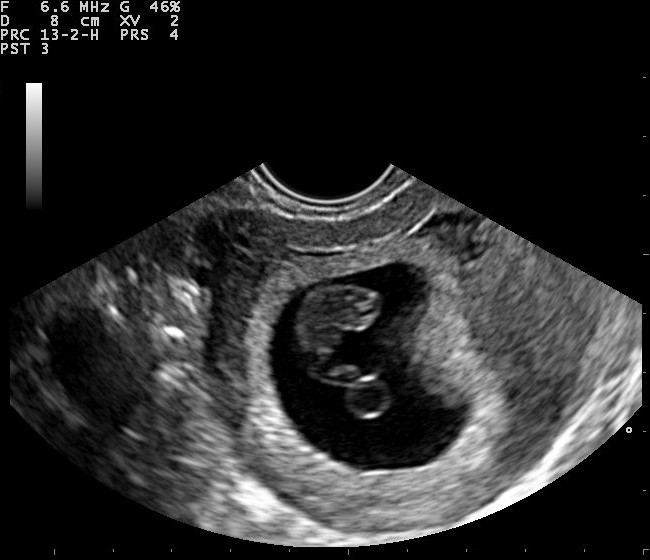
Single intrauterine pregnancy, first trimester. The gestational sac is pictured (black-appearing on ultrasound) containing a fetal pole and yolk sac (circular structure beneath fetal pole.)

=== Ultrasound ===
Obstetric ultrasonography may also be used to detect and diagnose pregnancy. It is very common to have a positive at-home urine pregnancy test before an ultrasound. Both abdominal and vaginal ultrasound may be used, but vaginal ultrasound allows for earlier visualization of the pregnancy. With obstetric ultrasonography the gestational sac (intrauterine fluid collection) can be visualized at 4.5 to 5 weeks gestation, the yolk sac at 5 to 6 weeks gestation, and fetal pole at 5.5 to 6 weeks gestation. Ultrasound is used to diagnose multiple gestation, which cannot be diagnosed based on the presence of hCG in urine or blood. Determination of the gestational age of the embryo/fetus is an additional benefit of ultrasound compared to hCG tests.

== Accuracy ==
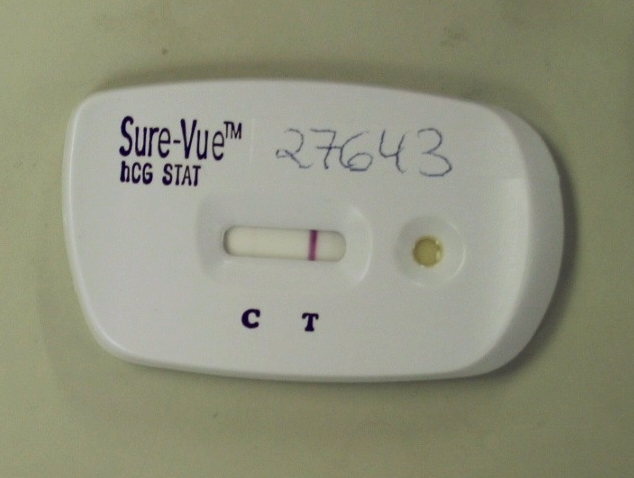
The control line of this pregnancy test is blank, making the test invalid.

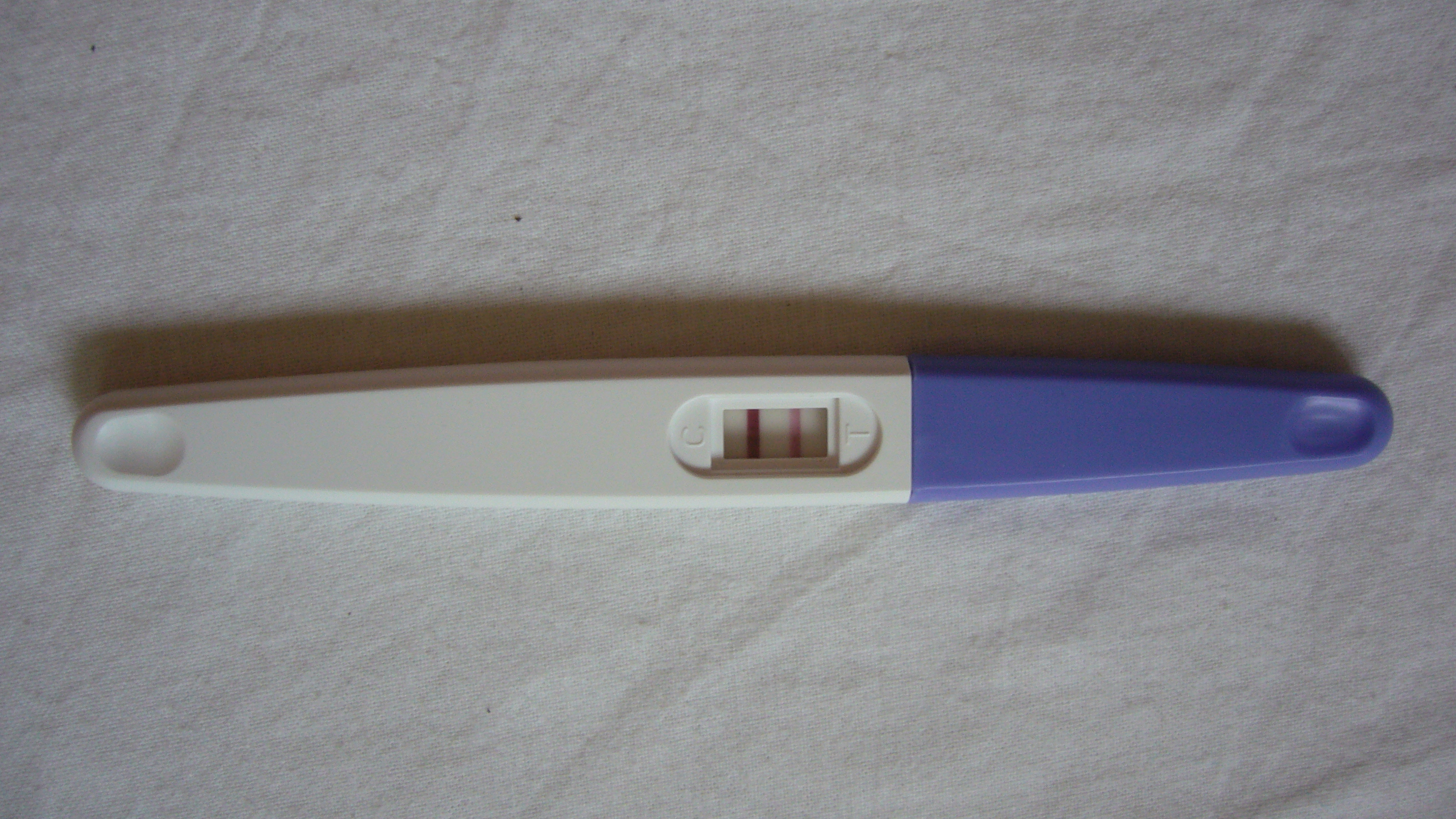
The control line on the left of this pregnancy test is visible, suggesting that the test result is valid. A pale purple line has also appeared on the right hand side (the test line) which clearly signifies that the subject is pregnant.

A systematic review published in 1998 showed that home pregnancy test kits, when used by experienced technicians, are almost as accurate as professional laboratory testing (97.4%). When used by consumers, however, the accuracy fell to 75%: the review authors noted that many users misunderstood or failed to follow the instructions included in the kits.

=== False positive ===
False positive pregnancy test results are rare and may occur for several reasons, including:

- user error in performing and interpreting the test,
- biochemical pregnancy (loss of pregnancy before signs of pregnancy are apparent on ultrasound, likely very soon after implantation),
- non-pregnant production of the hCG molecule (i.e. secretion due to a tumor or the pituitary gland, some diseases of the liver, cancers, including choriocarcinoma and other germ cell tumors, IgA deficiencies, heterophile antibodies, enterocystoplasties, gestational trophoblastic diseases (GTD), and gestational trophoblastic neoplasms).
- bacterial contamination and blood in urine

Spurious evaporation lines may appear on many home pregnancy tests if read after the suggested 3–5 minute window or reaction time, independent of an actual pregnancy. False positives may also appear on tests used past their expiration date.

==== Due to use of medication ====
Urine tests can be falsely positive in those that are taking the medications: chlorpromazine, promethazine, phenothiazines, methadone, aspirin, carbamazepine and drugs that cause high urinary pH.

=== False negative ===
False negative readings can occur when testing is done too early. hCG levels rise rapidly in early pregnancy and the chances of false negative test results diminish with time (increasing gestational age). Less sensitive urine tests and qualitative blood tests may not detect pregnancy until three or four days after implantation. Menstruation occurs on average 14 days after ovulation, so the likelihood of a false negative is low once a menstrual period is late. Ovulation may not occur at a predictable time in the menstrual cycle. A number of factors may cause an unexpectedly early or late ovulation, even for people with a history of regular menstrual cycles. Medical providers often struggle to 'rule out' pregnancy for medical testing or treatment that cannot be conducted during pregnancy before they can do an accurate urine pregnancy test.

More rare, false negative results can also occur due to a "hook effect", where a sample with a very high level of hCG is tested without dilution, causing an invalid result.

== Other uses ==
Pregnancy tests may be used to predict if a pregnancy is likely to continue or is abnormal. Miscarriage, or spontaneous abortion or pregnancy loss, is common in early pregnancy. Serial quantitative blood tests may be done, usually 48 hours apart, and interpreted based on the knowledge that hCG in a viable normal pregnancy rises rapidly in early pregnancy. For example, for a starting hCG level of 1,500 mIU/ml or less, the hCG of continuing, normal pregnancy will increase at least 49% in 48 hours. However, for pregnancies with a higher starting hCG, between 1,500 and 3,000 mIU/ml, the hCG should rise at least 40%; for a starting hCG greater than 3,000 mIU/ml, the hCG should increase at least 33%. Failure to rise by these minimums may indicate that the pregnancy is not normal, either as a failed intrauterine pregnancy or a possible ectopic pregnancy.

Ultrasound is also a common tool for determining viability and location of a pregnancy. Serial ultrasound may be used to identify non-viable pregnancies, as pregnancies that do not grow in size or develop expected structural findings on repeated ultrasounds over a 1–2 week interval may be identified as abnormal. Occasionally, a single ultrasound may be used to identify a pregnancy as non-viable; for example, an embryo that is greater than a certain size but that lacks a visible heart beat may be confidently determined to be not viable without the need for follow up ultrasound for confirmation.

== Research ==
Research has identified at least one other possible marker that may appear earlier and exclusively during pregnancy. For example, early pregnancy factor (EPF) can be detected in blood within 48 hours of fertilization, rather than after implantation. However, its reliable use as a pregnancy test remains unclear as studies have shown its presence in physiological situations besides pregnancy, and its application to humans remains limited.

== History ==
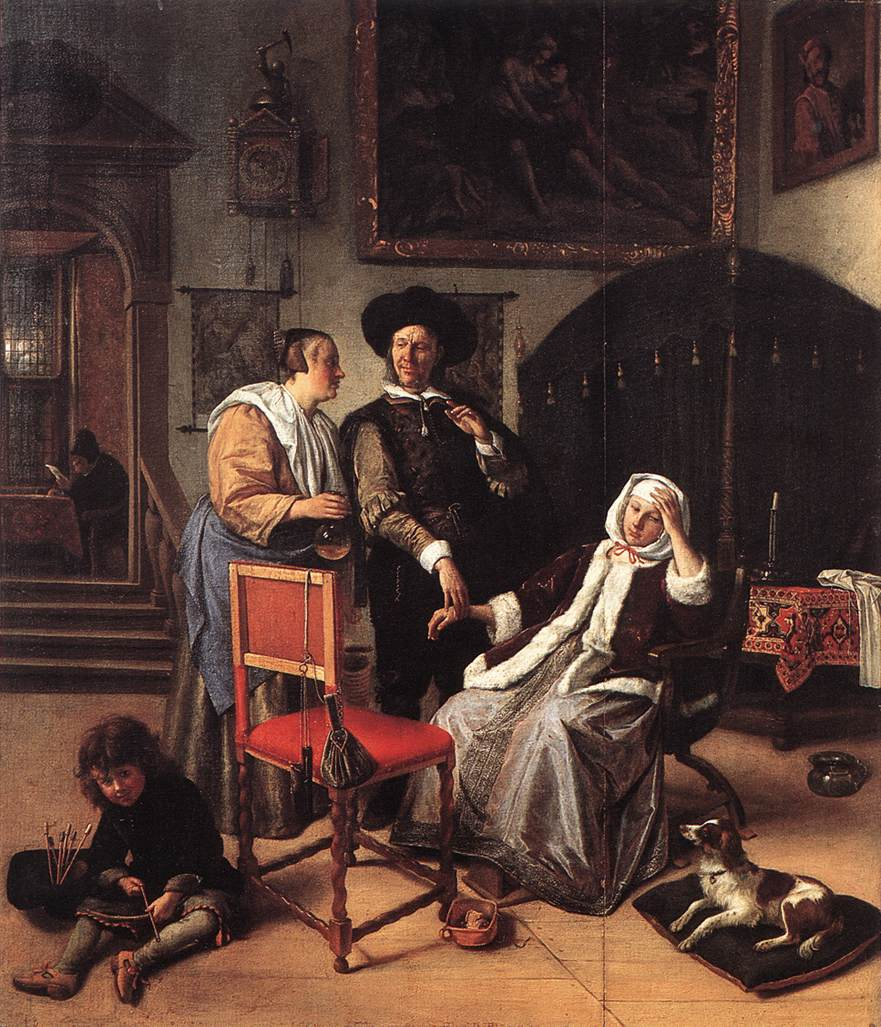
Jan Steen's The Doctor's Visit. Included in this 17th-century painting is a depiction of a dubious pregnancy test: a ribbon dipped in the patient's urine and then burned.

Records of attempts at pregnancy testing have been found as far back as the ancient Greek and ancient Egyptian cultures. The ancient Egyptians watered bags of wheat and barley with the urine of a possibly pregnant woman. Germination indicated pregnancy. The type of grain that sprouted was taken as an indicator of the fetus's sex. Hippocrates suggested that a woman who had missed her period should drink a solution of honey in water at bedtime: resulting abdominal distention and cramps would indicate the presence of a pregnancy. Avicenna and many physicians after him in the Middle Ages performed uroscopy, a nonscientific method to evaluate urine.

Selmar Aschheim and Bernhard Zondek introduced testing based on the presence of human chorionic gonadotropin (hCG) in 1928. Early studies of hCG had concluded that it was produced by the pituitary gland. In the 1930s, Doctor Georgeanna Jones discovered that hCG was produced not by the pituitary gland, but by the placenta. This discovery was important in relying on hCG as an early marker of pregnancy. In the Aschheim and Zondek test, an infantile female mouse was injected subcutaneously with urine of the woman to be tested, and the mouse later was killed and dissected. Presence of ovulation indicated that the urine contained hCG and meant that the subject was pregnant. A similar test was developed using immature rabbits.

At the beginning of the 1930s, Hillel Shapiro and Harry Zwarenstein, who were researchers at the University of Cape Town, discovered that if urine from a pregnant person was injected into the South African Xenopus frog and the frog ovulated, this indicated that the subject was pregnant. This test, known as the frog test, was used throughout the world from the 1930s to 1960s, with Xenopus frogs being exported in great numbers. Shapiro's advisor, Lancelot Hogben, claimed to have developed the pregnancy test himself, but this was refuted by both Shapiro and Zwarenstein in a letter to the British Medical Journal. A later article, independently authored, granted Hogben credit for the principle of using Xenopus to determine gonadotropin levels in a pregnant person's urine, but not for its usage as a functional pregnancy test.

Hormonal pregnancy tests such as Primodos and Duogynon were used in the 1960s and 1970s in the UK and Germany. These tests involved taking a dosed amount of hormones, and observing the response a few days later. A pregnant person does not react, as they are producing the hormones in pregnancy; a subject who is not pregnant responds to the absence of the hormone by beginning a new menstrual cycle. While the test was (is) generally considered accurate, research advancements have replaced it with simpler techniques.

Immunologic pregnancy tests were introduced in 1960 when Wide and Gemzell presented a test based on in-vitro hemagglutination inhibition. This was a first step away from in-vivo pregnancy testing and initiated a series of improvements in pregnancy testing leading to the contemporary at-home testing. Direct measurement of antigens, such as hCG, was made possible after the invention of the radioimmunoassay in 1959. Radioimmunoassays require sophisticated apparatus and special radiation precautions and are expensive.

Organon International obtained the first patent on a home pregnancy test in 1969, two years after product designer Margaret Crane noticed that the laboratory testing procedure was relatively simple and made a prototype. The product became available in Canada in 1971, and the United States in 1977, after delays caused by concerns over sexual morality and the ability of potentially pregnant women to perform the test and cope with the results without a doctor.

Another home pregnancy testing kit was based on the work of Judith Vaitukaitis and Glenn Braunstein, who developed a sensitive hCG assay at the National Institutes of Health. That test went onto the market under the name e.p.t. in 1978. e.p.t. originally stood for "Early Pregnancy Test" but was later changed to "Error Proof Test". In the 1970s, the discovery of monoclonal antibodies led to the development of the relatively simple and cheap immunoassays, such as agglutination-inhibition-based assays and sandwich ELISA, used in modern home pregnancy tests. Tests are now so cheap that they can be mass-produced in a general publication and used for advertising.

In 2022, Hoopsy introduced a home pregnancy test made from 99% paper, designed to reduce plastic waste from single-use pregnancy tests.

== See also ==
- Blastocyst
- Gravindex
