= Pregnancy tests using animals =

Method for early detection of pregnancy

Before immunological pregnancy tests were developed in the 1960s, women relied on urine-based pregnancy tests using animals, ranging from mice to frogs. Advancements in medical technology have enabled women to accurately check their pregnancy status by using 'pee-on-a-stick' pregnancy test kits at home. Before these accessible and convenient test kits were invented, scientists strived to discover a way in spotting pregnancy-related hormones by a natural, simple test, where animals were often included as clinical tools to facilitate the process.

Throughout history, there have been different animal-based tests with the aim of indicating the pregnancy status of women. The most well known test is the Hogben test, prevalent from the 1940s to the 1960s, by using the underlying principle of hormones and its subsequent biological response in both sexes of certain frog species. The Galli-Mainini test is another frog test developed based on similar principles.

Widespread export and traffic in African clawed frogs (Xenopus laevis) used for these tests is believed to have been the primary cause of the world-wide spread of chytridiomycosis, a fungal infectious disease in amphibians that has been linked to dramatic population declines of amphibian species on several continents.

== Background ==
Human chorionic gonadotrophin (hCG) is a hormone that is produced when a woman is pregnant, and this is because the placenta is responsible for its production. It takes approximately 9 days for the fertilized egg to move from the fallopian tubes to the uterus, where it implants itself into the walls of the uterus. Then, the placenta will begin to develop and release hCG into the mother's bloodstream, which can get passed into the urine. It takes around 6 days after the implantation of the fertilized egg, or just after the first menstrual period is missed, to detect hCG levels in the blood. The pee-on-a-stick pregnancy test only detects the presence of hCG, and cannot measure the level of hCG in the blood. Therefore, they can be used as a screening for pregnancy, however the level of hCG can also provide information about the pregnancy. Normally, the hCG level increases and peaks at the first 14 weeks of pregnancy, and no hCG is detected after the delivery of the baby. The amount of hCG can also reflect the pregnancy. Less hCG is released in a single pregnancy. Similarly, more hCG is released if the mother is carrying triplets, than if she is carrying twins. hCG blood tests can also screen for birth defects.

In an individual, hCG should not be present unless they are pregnant. However, hCG can also be produced by germ cell tumours, which are tumours from eggs or sperms. The hCG test can be used to screen for uterus cancer, or a molar pregnancy, which is when there is abnormal placental growth in the uterus. The hCG test can also be done after a miscarriage to ensure that a molar pregnancy is not present. In men, the hCG test can be used to screen for the presence of testicular cancer.

== Hogben Test ==
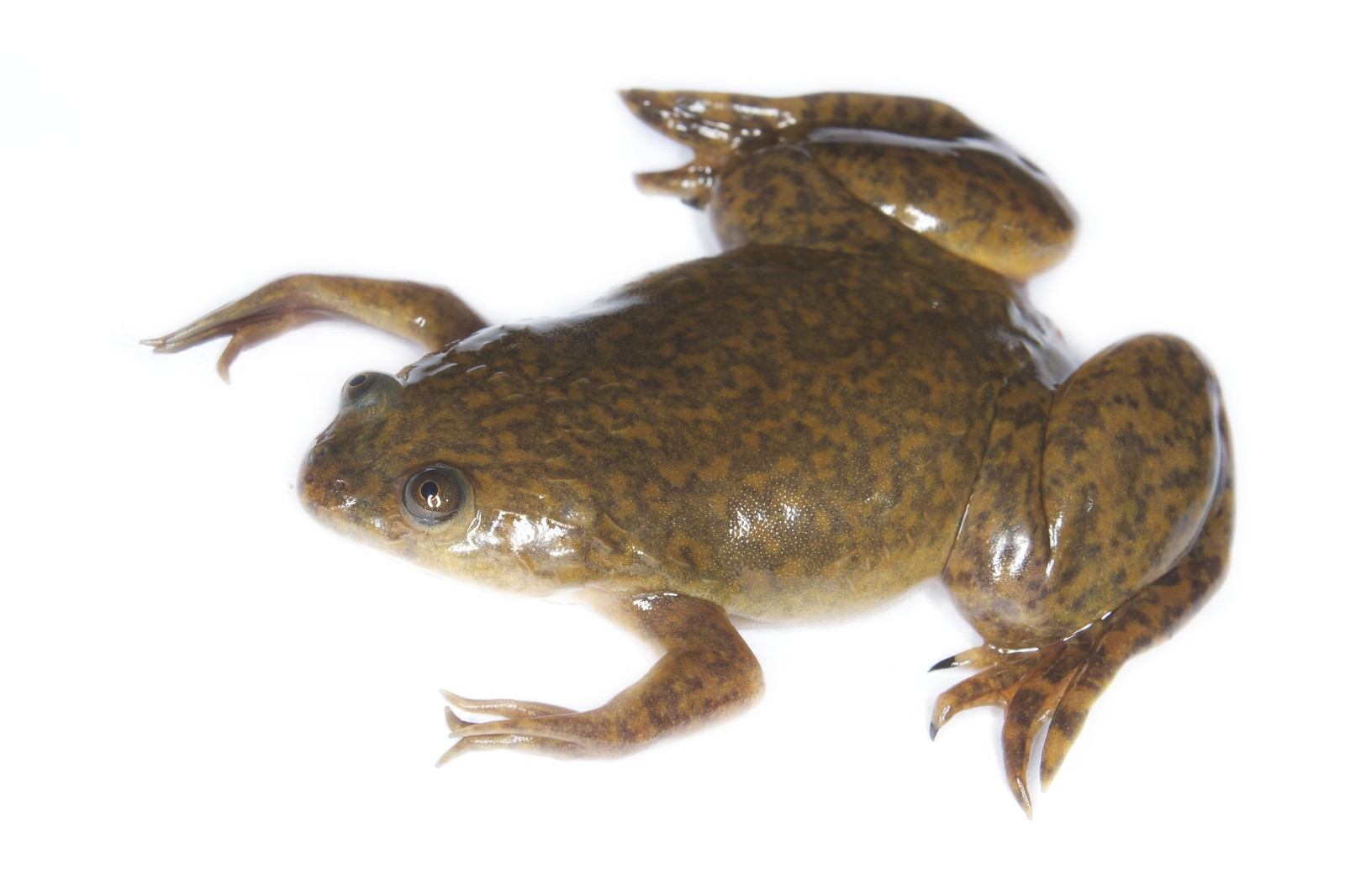
African clawed frog

The Hogben test, named after the British zoologist Lancelot Hogben, was one of the most reliable and rapid pregnancy tests from the 1940s to the 1960s. The urine samples were injected into African clawed frogs. The naming process of the Hogben test was subject to a scientific dispute in the early years of its development. The suggestion to name it after the British zoologist originated from his friend and colleague Francis Crew in 1939. His proposal sparked discontent at the University of Capetown's physiology department. The test was claimed to have been originally developed by two of the departments employees: Henri Zwarenstein and Hillel Abe Shapiro. Despite the proposal to settle the dispute by adopting the name 'Xenopus test' instead, the name 'Hogben test' established itself as dominant in Britain.

The Hogben test uses female frogs, unlike the Galli-Mainini test which uses male frogs.

Hogben's earlier works revolved around pituitary hormones and frogs. One day, Hogben and his team observed that the skin colour of the adult frogs was dependent on their growing environment. The colour ranges from a dark environment which led to black skin colour, to a light environment where light-coloured frogs were found. Hogben hypothesized this being the result of the pituitary gland's presence. Hogben validated his hypothesis by proving that the removal of the pituitary gland would result in the white skin colour of frogs regardless of their growing environment. More significantly, during his study of the frog pituitary gland, he discovered female frogs would ovulate, after the injection of ox pituitary gland extracts into its dorsal lymph sac, which created a basis for his future discovery.

While Hogben was carrying on with his work when he moved to South Africa in 1927, where his research revolved around injecting Xenopus laevis with ox pituitary gland extracts, he accidentally discovered that Xenopus frogs would ovulate within a day if they were injected with pituitary extracts, as they were very sensitive to any hormonal changes. During this period, scientists knew that pregnant women's urine contained pituitary hormones, and Hogben came to a realization that perhaps the presence of pituitary hormones in pregnant women's urine could also be detected through an ovulating response in these frogs. Upon this unearthing, Hogben and another animal geneticist Francis Albert Eley Crew spent two years developing a way to raise and maintain these frogs in a laboratory setting, which led to a twenty-year boom in Hogben tests, which were claimed to be nearly 100% accurate. In reality, different studies have measured the test's accuracy as 93.1%, 97.99% and 99.93%, respectively.

=== Testing procedures for the Hogben Test ===
The Hogben test procedure consisted of injecting a sample of women's urine into the skin on the back of the frog, specifically into the dorsal lymph sac. Around 12 hours later, results could be seen. If the woman was pregnant, then the frog would be ovulating, and a small cluster of eggs could be seen at the rear end of the frog. Interestingly, the same could be observed in the male species of Xenopus laevis as well, and they were seen to produce sperm upon injection of a pregnant woman's urine. This mechanism is due to the pituitary hormone human chorionic gonadotropin (hCG), which is present only in a pregnant woman's urine. If the woman is not pregnant, no sperm or egg would be produced from the male or female frog respectively.

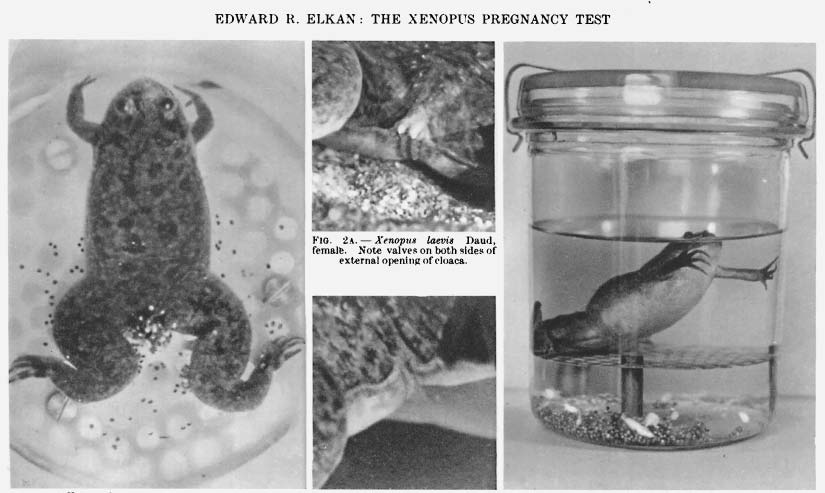
Xenopus pregnancy test

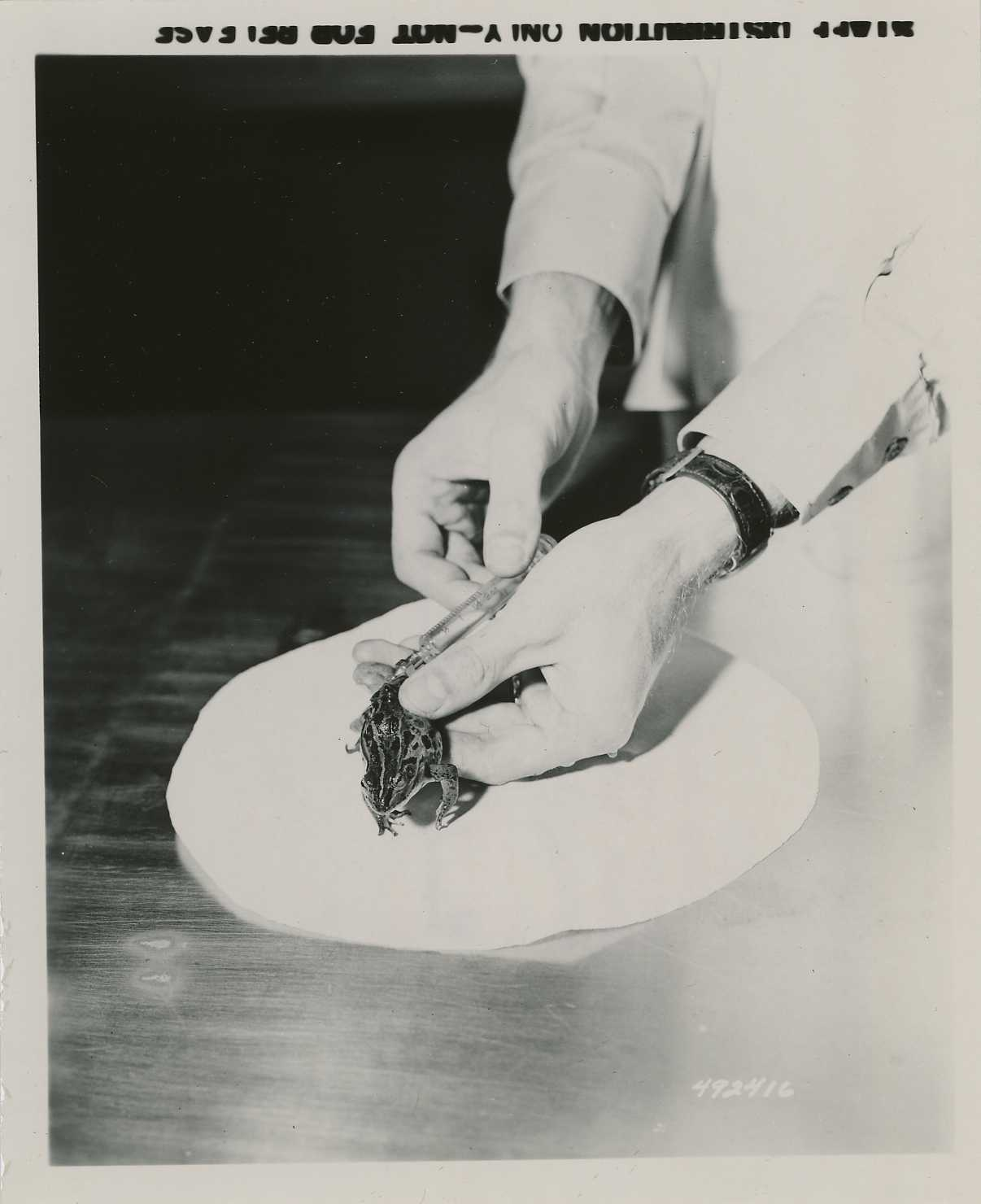
Injection of sample urine to the dorsal lymph sac of frog

=== Advantages ===
Previous pregnancy tests, called A-Z tests or rabbit tests, were troublesome and time-consuming. They consisted of injecting women's urine twice a day, for three days, into mice or rabbits. Then, the mice or rabbits would have to be killed and scientists would examine if the animals had enlarged ovaries. This ovary growth is due to the hCG. Hogben tests were soon more popular and performed more widely than the A-Z tests because results could be seen in less than a day, and yielded highly accurate results. Moreover, Hogben tests did not involve killing the frogs, so each frog could be reused again, unlike in the A-Z or rabbit tests where the animals would have to be killed to examine ovary enlargement. Xenopus laevis were also easier to maintain than rodents or rabbits, and raising them came at a lower cost. This efficient and reliable Hogben test was used till the development of an even simpler and animal-free pregnancy test in the late 1960s.

=== Development of applications ===
The frog test had been a highly dependable pregnancy testing method since the 1930s until the immunological test was presented in the 1960s. Pharmacists would inject the female's early urine sample into the frogs and confirm their pregnancy with the spawning of eggs within 18 hours. However, there was a critical prerequisite for accurately performing the test. Women should wait for a few more days after the mark of their late menstruation. As the test was incredibly helpful and considerably time-effective, many countries started to import Xenopus laevis, which contributed to the spread of this species across Europe, Australia, Asia, North America, and almost everywhere around the globe. The African clawed frog is nearly unaffected by exposure to the Amphibian Chytrid Fungus, which has been linked to dramatic population declines of amphibian species all around the globe. Since the global spread of the fungus coincides with the period of increased trade of the African clawed frog, it has been suggested that the frog may have been the vector of the initial global spread of the fungus.

Today, Hogben's test has become obsolete, however, it has made Xenopus frogs an important model and organism in the scientific community, and the Xenopus species are used to study a wide variety of diseases. Even the tadpoles of the Xenopus species have been incorporated as an organism used in the study of developmental biology, such as in frog-based diagnostic tools of polycystic kidney disease.

== Galli Mainini test ==
Carlos Galli Mainini (1914–1961), who also specialized in endocrinology, tried to improve on the existing Hogben's test, which took over 12 hours for early screening of pregnancy. After making the observation that male frogs or toads generate spermatozoa after long contact with female frogs, the gonadotropic hormone would be secreted from the females' bodies. He realized the female frogs used in Hogben's test could be replaced by South American male frogs or toads. Women's urine could be injected into the adult male frog's dorsal lymph sac. The gonadotropic hormone in the urine of pregnant women, after injection, would lead to the release of sperms from the frogs.

This new testing method became widely used as it was even more efficient, with only 3 hours of waiting time for the results. He found different species suitable for this experiment, mostly indigenous frogs from Israel, like the European green toad, marsh frog, and European tree frog.

Comparison between different animal-based pregnancy tests
	A-Z test	Rabbit Test / Friedman test	Hogben test	Galli Mainini test
Developer	German gynecologists Selmar Aschheim and Bernhard Zondek	Maurice Friedman and Maxwell Edward Lapham	Lancelot Thomas Hogben	Carlos Galli Mainini
Year of discovery	1927	1931	1930	1947
Mechanism of action	identify hCG presence in pregnant women urine			
Procedure	Inject woman urine into immature female mice	Inject women urine to rabbits intravenously	Inject the female's early urine sample into the dorsal sac of frogs	
Indication of positive test result	Upon dissection of mice, enlargement of ovaries and follicular maturation could be observed	Upon dissection of rabbits, enlargement of ovaries and follicularmaturation could be observed	A cluster of millimeter-sized, black-and-white spheres, which were eggs, ejected from frogs	Ejection of the spermatozoa of male toads
Animal used	Mice	Rabbit	African clawed frog – Xenopus laevis	Mature (male) toads – Rhinella arenarum
Duration of test	A few days after injection of urine	Approximately 48 hours after injection	5–18 hours after injection	After the 5th hour of injection
Advantages	Reliable with error rate < 2%	Reliable	Reliable (99.8% accuracy), frogs not killed, time-effective	Reliable, rapid response
Drawbacks	Killing of mice, long waiting time for results	Expensive, multiple rabbits killed if results are inconclusive, long waiting time for results	Women have to wait for a few days after the mark of their late menstruation to perform the test	Not all species of male toads could be used

Similar to the Hogben test, a small amount of the women's urine would be injected into the dorsal lymph sac of the male frog. Pregnant women contain the hormone human chorionic gonadotrophin in their urine. Therefore the presence of this hormone in the urine injected into the male frog, would cause the frog to release sperm within three hours. The sperm cells can be seen under a microscope. This procedure is painless for the frog, and the frog can be reused for another test after 2 weeks.

After the suggestions of male frog species for pregnancy tests, researchers had been working on the validation of the accuracy of the test, by ruling out other possible sources that led to the presence of mature living spermatozoa in male frogs' urine. It was found that dry northern leopard frogs would be especially sensitive to distilled water and less sensitive to the gonadotropic hormone. Some further methods to improve accuracy were also suggested.
