= David Pratt (failed assassin) =

British and South African businessman as well as anti-Apartheid activist

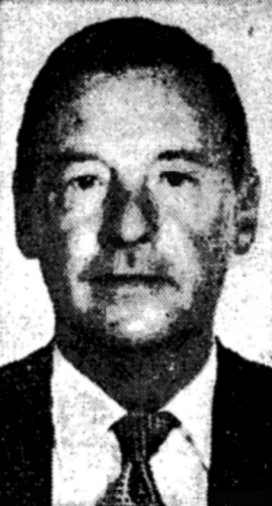
- Pratt c. 1961
- Born: 1 October 1908; Croydon, London, England
- Died: 1 October 1961 (aged 53); Bloemfontein, Orange Free State,^{[a]} South Africa
- Cause of death: Asphyxiation (ruled suicide)
- Education: University of Cambridge; Gonville and Caius College (BA, 1931)
- Occupations: Businessman; farmer; anti-apartheid activist
- Known for: Attempted assassination of Hendrik Verwoerd
- Political party: Liberal Party
- Spouses: Mary Hatrick (divorced); Patty van Heijningen
- Children: 4

Notes
- a. Now the Free State

David Beresford Pratt (1 October 1908 – 1 October 1961) was a British and South African businessman, farmer, and anti-apartheid activist. He was a wealthy liberal who was deeply upset over black poverty and racial segregation and spoke out against apartheid. Outraged by the Sharpeville massacre, Pratt tried to assassinate South African Prime Minister Hendrik Verwoerd, shooting him twice. Verwoerd survived, but was successfully assassinated six years later by Dimitri Tsafendas.

== Early life ==
Pratt was a farmer and wealthy businessman from the United Kingdom. He was born in Croydon, London, to Arthur Pratt, businessman, and Georgina Wills. He had one sibling, Ethel Margaret Pratt. When he was two years old, the family immigrated to South Africa and settled in the Houghton Estate, Johannesburg and he would eventually attended King Edward VII school. His epilepsy began either when he was eight or twelve; his mother's sister suffered from the condition. He studied at Gonville and Caius College University of Cambridge, England, where he studied Economics (part I) and Law (part II), graduating in 1931 with a third class honours degree.

== Personal and business life ==
He owned many businesses and properties. He had four farms: Moloney's Eye in the Magaliesberg, and Steenkoppie, Delarey and Rietfontein in the Krugersdorp area. He ran the family sweet factory, and some of his businesses included a manganese mine, ran a cattle stud of Ayrshire, a dairy, and trout farm. Other interests were the Anglican church and the Boy's Town charity. He had friends both in the English and Afrikaans community. During World War Two he volunteered for the air force and was categorised class C because of his epilepsy and became an office clerk. He was treated for epilepsy during his service but was court martialled and boarded, declared unfit and discharged in October 1943.

He married British journalist Mary Lindsay Hatrick in February 1935 and they had two children, Susan Dianna in 1937 and David John in August 1940, though the latter died in March 1945. The marriage was difficult, with Pratt having mental health problems which were treated with psychotherapy. Mary left him the month her son died. Susan, his daughter remained behind in Johannesburg but Mary would return to Johannesburg. Divorce proceedings were instituted from 1945 by Pratt's lawyer, Issie Maisels, with joint custody obtained in February 1946. His mental health deteriorated during and after the divorce, attacks of epilepsy and depression, threatened in both South Africa and the USA in 1948–1949. The relationship between Pratt and his ex-wife, Mary, remained difficult, with issues between them persisting after the end of their marriage. Pratt was accused of failing to properly look after his daughter's upbringing, and there was debate regarding the distribution of Mary's grandfather's inheritance, but by June 1953, these were resolved with Mary obtaining sole guardianship over their daughter, Susan, and Pratt being allowed access.

His second marriage was to Patty van Heijningen. They met in 1946 and would marry in The Hague in September 1961. They had two children, Georgina Francesca in 1953 and Charles David in 1956. The marriage was again destabilised by his mental health issues. In 1954, shortly after the birth of their first child, Pratt claimed to have received a message which he should convey to South Africa. He was boarded and diagnosed as suffering from "grandiose delusions of the political saviour type". He was admitted to Tara Psychiatric Hospital and Sanatoria where he was locked up due to violence.

Pratt was almost constantly in psychiatric treatment from 1956 through 1959. His Dutch wife feared for her safety because he threatened her. In the beginning of 1958 she left him and returned to The Hague, taking their two children with her. He followed her with a gun in his pocket but was apprehended at Amsterdam Airport. His neurologist, Dr Chesler, urged his sister to have a curator bonis (legal guardian) appointed for him because he could no longer manage his affairs properly.

He desperately tried to win his wife back. When that failed, he attempted to kidnap his daughter during a ski holiday in 1959. As he became more desperate about his marital problems, Pratt tried to commit suicide on three occasions. He returned to South Africa in January 1960.

Pratt was deeply upset by the racial injustices of apartheid in South Africa. He was concerned with poverty among black South Africans and built a school and houses on his farm for black workers and their children. Pratt was a member of the South African and British Liberal parties and was active in the British anti-apartheid movement. At meetings of the Liberal Party of South Africa, he spoke openly against apartheid. Pratt's distress over apartheid turned to rage after the South African Police slaughtered 69 black protesters, including 29 children, in the Sharpeville massacre.

Pratt later explained why he tried to kill Verwoerd:

"The feeling became very strong that someone in this country must do something about it, and it better bloody well be me, feeling as I do about it."

== Assassination attempt ==
A Pathe News clip covering the attempted assassination

On 9 April 1960, South African Prime Minister Hendrik Verwoerd had opened the Union Exposition in Milner Park, Johannesburg. He had finished viewing the livestock judging in the arena and returned to the VIP pavilion. Pratt got close to him, called out Verwoerd's name and shot him twice, at point blank range, with a .22 pistol, once in the cheek while his second shot, it was claimed by Pratt in court, was due to Lieutenant Colonel Geoffrey Marchant Harrison, the president of the Witwatersrand Agricultural Union, grabbing his hand and he shot Verwoerd in the ear. Verwoerd was rushed to hospital, and within two months had made a complete recovery. Pratt was arrested at the scene and taken to the Marshall Square police station, and then to the Forensic Medical Laboratory.

== Police investigation ==
After a police investigation, they concluded no political group or other persons were involved in the assassination attempt.

== Court case ==
He appeared for a preliminary hearing in the Johannesburg Magistrates' Court on 20 and 21 July 1960, once it was clear that Verwoerd's injuries were not fatal. He was represented by Issie Maisel and Pratt would not allow his personal psychiatric records to be presented.

Susan Pratt, his daughter, sent an ex parte application to court in September 1960 before the court case began requesting it appoint a curator ad litem for her father as he could not give proper instruction to his lawyers and in doing so his personal medical records became court knowledge. Advocate William McEwan was appointed as his curator.

The trial began September 12, 1960 with Maisels asking court that Pratt should be declared criminally insane, due to epilepsy, based on the law at the time, the Mental Disorders Act, 1916. The prosecutor declared he would not oppose.

Pratt claimed he had been shooting 'the epitome of apartheid'. The court accepted the medical reports submitted to it by five psychiatrists, all of which confirmed that Pratt lacked legal capacity and could not be held criminally liable for having shot the prime minister. On 26 September 1960, he was committed to Oranje Hospital, a mental hospital in Bloemfontein.

Before and after Pratt's court hearing, friends stated that he was perfectly sane. His defence team believed the only way to ensure a lighter punishment was to plead insanity. In his court hearing Pratt declared: "South Africa has to throw off the slimy snake apartheid which is gripping its throat."

== Death ==
Pratt died on 1 October 1961, his fifty-third birthday, and shortly before his parole was to be considered. Pratt's cause of death was asphyxiation and was ruled as a suicide. No inquest was held into his death. Doubts still remain about the circumstances of Pratt's demise as many purported suicides during apartheid were later proven to be murders by the police or security forces.
