= Sonia Machanick =

South African physician (1925–1977)

- Born: 15 June 1925; Cape Town, South Africa
- Died: 12 November 1977 (aged 52); Johannesburg, South Africa
- Citizenship: South African
- Spouse: Hillel Abbe Shapiro
- Children: 4; Janice Shapiro, Paul Shapiro, Ian Shapiro and Roy Courtnall Summerfield
- Parents: Soloman Machanick (father); Edna Annie Love Machanick (nee Courtnall) (mother)

Sonia Machanick (15 June 1925 – 12 November 1977) was a South African medical doctor, author and educational psychologist who pioneered new methods of teaching children with dyslexia and other learning difficulties. She founded Japari School, a special school in Johannesburg that provides education for children who struggle to thrive in the mainstream education system. She wrote a series of four graded reading books (Sounds Travel Too) and other reading tutors in English and Afrikaans (Tom Kan Lees) that were widely used throughout the 1960s and 1970s for teaching the phonics reading method, as well as articles concerning the treatment of children with learning difficulties.

== Early life and education ==
Machanick was the second of three children born in Cape Town to immigrant parents; her mother from the United Kingdom and her father from Lithuania. Her mother, Edna Annie Love Courtnall, was one of the first female LLB graduates (1922) at the University of London, and she later set up a National Fellowship Award through the South African Association of Women graduates. Awards every year are made to two South African women who are studying for a Diploma or Degree in any discipline.

After completing school, Sonia Machanick enrolled in the medical course at Cape Town University. While a student, she initiated a vacation scheme for medical students to provide medical support at a mission hospital in the Transkei and she was a member of the team that inaugurated SHAWCO, a student-run NGO based at the University of Cape Town, that seeks to improve the quality of life for individuals in developing communities within the Cape Metropolitan area.

After graduating in 1947, she returned to the main university campus to study psychology and she worked at the University Child Guidance Clinic.

She married Hillel Abbe Shapiro who was a lecturer at the university medical school.

== Career ==
Soon after, they relocated to Johannesburg where she was initially employed at the Alexandra Township TB clinic and then as a registrar at Tara Psychiatric Hospital.

These experiences informed her decision to forge a career in the area of remedial education, with the specific aim of developing facilities for the diagnosis and treatment of children whose emotional and educational needs were not catered for in the mainstream educational system and she started working with children who struggled with a range of learning problems, including emotional behavioural issues, dyslexia and dyspraxia.

Together with her husband and a group of other parents, Sonia Machanick was instrumental in founding South Africa's first mainstream multi-racial high school, Woodmead School.

== JAPARI School ==
As her practice grew, the need for larger premises led to her setting up Japari School in Johannesburg in 1966.

The school expanded further with new buildings and was able to take larger numbers of children as well as hosting conferences and work placements for special needs teachers. Although this was during the Apartheid era, Japari operated from the start on a non-racial basis, and also supported black pupils with scholarships to mainstream schools.

After her early death aged 52 in 1977, there was a period of uncertainty, after which the school re-established itself on a new site. Dr Machanick's work in the field of educational research was recognised by the College of Medicine of South Africa, and the College established the Sonia Machanick Travelling Fellowship. The Sonia Machanick Memorial Lecture was set up after her death. From January 2002 the headteacher has been Steve Rees.

== Selected works ==
- Sounds Travel Too. Book 1
- Sounds Travel Too. Book 2
- Sounds travel Too. Book 3.
- Sounds Travel Too. Book 4
- The management of a child with a learning disability
- Learning disabilities in childhood - some guidelines and cautions
- Congresses and Meetings
- People and Events
- I'll Make Me a World
- Where Can I Go? Cape Town
- Waarheen kan ek gaan? Kaapstad
- Tom Lees. Boek 1
- Tom Kan Lees. Boek 2
- Johannes Arnoldus van Beukering; Maurice David Gelfand; Sonia Machanick
