= Curator (disambiguation) =

A curator is a manager or overseer, usually at a cultural institution.

Curator may also refer to:

- Library curator, senior management at the French libraries
- Curator Aquarum, a Roman official
- Curator ad litem and Curator bonis, legal representatives in Scots law and Roman-Dutch law
