= Japari School =

Location
- 1-3 Dundalk Avenue; Parkview; Johannesburg 2193; South Africa

Information
- Type: Co-Ed Independent Primary School
- Motto: Vision - Faith - Courage
- Established: 1966
- Headmaster: Ingrid Kamffer
- Grades: 1–7
- Enrollment: Approx. 100
- Accreditation: The Independent Schools Association of Southern Africa (ISASA), South African Heads of Independent Schools (SAHISA), South African Bursars of Independent Schools (SABISA), Corporate Member of the Southern African Association for Learning and Educational Difficulties (SAALED)
- Website: japari.co.za

Japari School is an independent pre-preparatory and preparatory primary school located in Johannesburg, South Africa. It aims to serve learners from Grade 1 to Grade 7 who experience difficulty learning in mainstream channels.

== History ==
The school was founded in 1966 as a clinic by Sonia Machanick. Machanick's work in the field of educational research was recognised by the College of Medicine of South Africa, who established the Sonia Machanick Travelling Fellowship. The name of the school was taken from the names of Machanick's four children: Janice, Paul, Roy and Ian.

Kathleen Argyle took over as headmistress upon Machanick's death in 1978. Joan Gardiner succeeded her in 1994, Steve Rees 2002, the current headmistress is Ingrid Kamffer who assumed office in 2021.

== Today ==
Since being founded the school has grown to almost 200 students enrolled.

== Accreditation ==
Japari is listed as an associated school on the Independent Schools Association of Southern Africa (ISASA) school listing website. It is also a member of:

- South African Bursars of Independent Schools (SABISA)
- Corporate Member of the Southern African Association for Learning and Educational Difficulties (SAALED)
- South African Heads of Independent Schools (SAHISA)
