= Carl Axel Gemzell =

Swedish medical doctor

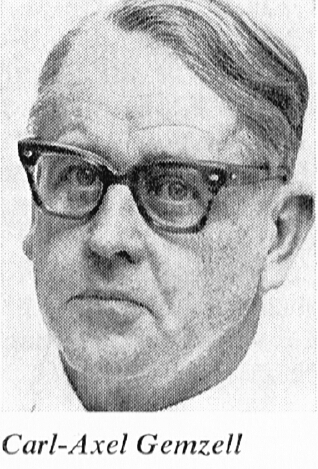
Carl-Axel Gemzell (undated)

Carl Axel Gemzell (January 4, 1910 in Motala, Sweden – February 11, 2007 in Norrtälje, Sweden) was a Swedish medical doctor and pioneer in reproductive endocrinology.

== Life ==
Gemzell studied medicine at the Karolinska Institute and was registered as a physician in 1940. After training in surgery and obstetrics and gynecology he studied experimental endocrinology at the Wenner-Gren Institute and received his PhD in 1948. Subsequently, he worked at the Institute for Experimental Biology of the University of California, Berkeley before returning to Sweden. He became professor in Ob-Gyn at the Uppsala University Faculty of Medicine. After his mandatory retirement in Sweden in 1975, he moved to the USA where he continued to work at SUNY Downstate Medical Center, Brooklyn, New York, and later at the University of Puerto Rico in San Juan before he retired in Florida and, after the death of his wife, returned to Sweden.

== Work ==
Gemzell developed methods to extract the human growth hormone and human gonadotropins from cadaver pituitary glands. In 1958 Gemzell was the first to show that extracted gonadotropins containing FSH could be used as fertility medication to stimulate ovulation in women with anovulatory infertility. Ovulation stimulation using FSH medication became the basis of modern infertility therapy such as IVF. First pregnancies were achieved in 1961 and Gemzell recognized early that multiple pregnancy and the ovarian hyperstimulation syndrome were major side effect of the therapy. Gemzell's pituitary gonadotropin preparation was soon replaced by FSH extracts from urine of postmenopausal women by a method that was developed by Piero Donini and later marketed as Pergonal. Decades later pituitary extractions were proven to be unsafe as Creutzfeldt–Jakob disease could be transmitted.

In 1960 Gemzell and Leif Wide presented a pregnancy test based on in-vitro hemagglutination inhibition, a first step away from in-vivo pregnancy testing. This test initiated a series of improvements in pregnancy testing leading to the contemporary at-home testing.

Gemzell was a collector of modern paintings and drawings. A part of his collection was publicly exhibited at the Moderna Museet in Stockholm in 1996.

The Gemzell Prize is awarded annually to medical researchers by the University of Uppsala since 1977.

== Fertility fraud allegations ==
In 2023, SVT uncovered a scandal involving Gemzell. In the 1960s and 1970s, Swedish soldiers serving in Uppsala were invited to donate sperm samples, which they were told would be used for research purposes. At least 242 men volunteered for the program. Instead, the sperm was used to impregnate women without the consent of the men involved. Carl Gemzell is alleged to have impregnated at least five women using the donated sperm of at least three soldiers. This was part of a wider sperm theft scandal in Sweden, where it has emerged that fertility doctors were using sperm men had donated for fertility analysis to impregnate other women.

== Key publications ==
- 1958, First report using pituitary FSH
- 1960, "An immunological pregnancy test"
- 1962, "Induction of ovulation with human pituitary gonadotrophins"
- 1966, Review of clinical results using pituitary FSH for anovulatory women
