= Ad litem =

Term used in law

Ad litem (Latin, lit. 'for the suit') is a term used in law to refer to the appointment by a court of one party to act in a lawsuit on behalf of another party such as a child or an incapacitated adult, who is deemed incapable of representing themself. An individual who acts in this capacity is generally called a guardian ad litem in such legal proceedings; in Scotland, curator ad litem is the equivalent term. After the amendment of the Children Act 1989 which established the role of children's guardian, the term "guardian ad litem" in English law is only used in private law proceedings under rule 9.5. The United States legal system, which at its inception was based on the English legal system, continues to use the terms "guardian ad litem" and "attorney ad litem". The legal system in the Republic of Ireland also uses the term "guardian ad litem".

The term is also used in property litigation, where a person may be appointed to act on behalf of an estate in court proceedings, when the estate's proper representatives are unable or unwilling to act.

The term is also sometimes used to refer to a judge who participates in only a particular case or a limited set of cases and does not have the same status as the other judges of the court. Such a jurist is more commonly called a judge ad hoc. Judges ad hoc are particularly common in international courts, and are fewer in number elsewhere.
