= Maurice Friedman =

American physician and researcher (1903–1991)

Maurice Harold Friedman (October 27, 1903 – March 8, 1991) was an American physician, gastroenterologist, and reproductive-physiology researcher. He is known for the development of the rabbit test, a pregnancy test developed in 1931 while he was teaching at the Perelman School of Medicine at the University of Pennsylvania.

== Biography ==
Friedman was born on October 27, 1903, in Gary, Indiana, United States. Aged 16, he entered the University of Chicago and was awarded a bachelor's degree and a doctorate, both in physiology and medicine. From 1928, he taught at the University of Pennsylvania in physiology. At the Perelman School of Medicine, he developed the rabbit test in 1931, a pregnancy test. Female rabbits were injected with a woman's urine and to proof a pregnancy, the rabbit was killed and its ovaries inspected for corpora lutea and corpora hemorrhagicum, with their presence confirming a pregnancy. When asked whether the test was reliable, Friedman answered:

It's highly reliable. The only more reliable test is to wait nine months.

Friedman moved to Washington in 1936 and joined the Georgetown University Hospital and held roles at the Georgetown University School of Medicine and the Washington Hospital Center. He gained employment at the Henry A. Wallace Beltsville Agricultural Research Center, where he continued with his research in reproductive physiology. He retired from medical work in 1959 and joined the Planned Parenthood, Children's House and the Social Hygiene Society, where he worked as a financial advisor.

Friedman died of cancer after a long illness on March 8, 1991, at his home in Sarasota, Florida.

== Selected publications ==
- Friedman, Maurice H.; Lapham, Maxwell E. (March 1931). "A Simple, Rapid Procedure for the Laboratory Diagnosis of Early Pregnancies". American Journal of Obstetrics and Gynecology. 21 (3): 405–410. doi:10.1016/s0002-9378(16)42174-5. ISSN 0002-9378. Wikidata Q115596844.
