= Uppsala University Faculty of Medicine =

Swedish medical school

Faculty of Medicine
- Type: Faculty (medical school)
- Established: 1620s
- Affiliation: Uppsala University
- Location: Uppsala, Uppland, Sweden
- Website: www.uu.se/vetenskapsomrade/medicin-och-farmaci/

The Uppsala University Faculty of Medicine is one of the faculties of Uppsala University, Sweden, and is mainly dedicated to education and research in medicine and related fields of science and practice.

== Education ==
The Uppsala University Faculty of Medicine provides the medical education at Uppsala University. This medical education is mainly located at Uppsala Biomedical Centre (BMC) during the initial and rather pre-clinical 2 years, while the rest of the education is mainly located at Uppsala Academic Hospital or other hospitals in the region.

== Notable people ==
- Robert Bárány, the recipient of the 1914 Nobel Prize in Physiology or Medicine for his work on the physiology and pathology of the vestibular apparatus of the ear, was a professor at Uppsala University from 1917 until his death in 1936.
- Carl Axel Gemzell (1910 - 2007) made research dealing with gonadotropins, including development of a pregnancy test to detect human chorionic gonadotropin (hCG), as well as characterization of human pituitary and placental gonadotropins. He performed the first successful ovulation induction in women with hypothalamic-pituitary insufficiency using human pituitary gonadotropins while being a professor at Uppsala University.
