= Rabbit test =

Pregnancy test

The rabbit test, or Friedman test, was an early pregnancy test that required killing and dissecting a rabbit to obtain the results. The test was developed in 1931 by Maurice Friedman and Maxwell Edward Lapham at the University of Pennsylvania.

== Test ==
The hormone human chorionic gonadotropin (hCG) is produced during pregnancy and can be found in a pregnant woman's urine and blood; it indicates the presence of an implanted fertilized egg. An earlier test, known as the AZ test, was developed by Selmar Aschheim and Bernhard Zondek. When urine from a woman in the early months of pregnancy was injected into immature female mice, their ovaries would enlarge and show follicular maturation. The test was considered reliable, with an error rate of less than 2%. Friedman and Lapham's test was essentially identical, but replaced the mouse with a rabbit. A few days after the injection, the animal would be dissected and the size of her ovaries examined.

The rabbit test became a widely used bioassay (animal-based test) to test for pregnancy. The term "rabbit test" was first recorded in 1949, and was the origin of a common euphemism, "the rabbit died", for a positive pregnancy test. The phrase was, in fact, based on a common misconception about the test. While many people assumed that the injected rabbit would die only if the woman was pregnant, in fact all rabbits used for the test died, as they had to be dissected in order to examine the ovaries.

A later alternative to the rabbit test, known as the Hogben test, used the African clawed frog, and yielded results without the need to cut the animal open. Modern pregnancy tests continue to operate on the basis of testing for the presence of the hormone hCG in the blood or urine, but they no longer require the use of a live animal.

== In popular culture ==
- Rabbit Test is a 1978 comedy film about the world's first pregnant man.
- "Rabbit Test" is a 2022 science fiction short story about abortion by Samantha Mills, which won the 2022 Nebula Award for Best Short Story and the 2023 Theodore Sturgeon Award.
- Friday is a 1982 science fiction novel by American writer Robert Heinlein. Multiple characters discuss getting a mouse test (or a gerbil test) done when characters wonder if they are pregnant.
- "Sweet Emotion", a 1975 song by Aerosmith, contains the lyric "You can't catch me 'cause the rabbit done died."
- "What's Up, Doc?" is an episode of the television series M*A*S*H which aired 30 January 1978 (S5 E20). A major plot point is Hawkeye managing to conduct a rabbit test to determine if Margaret is pregnant without killing Radar's pet rabbit.
- "Emancipation" is an episode of the television series House, M.D. (S5 E08). The test is mentioned at the beginning of the episode, with House saying: "... a pregnancy test only takes five minutes and we no longer kill rabbits".
- "Hands and Knees" is an episode of the television series Mad Men (S4 E10). After Joan informs Roger that she is pregnant, he asks whether she has had a rabbit test to confirm.
- “Jack’s Ten” is an episode of the television series Three’s Company (S6 E19). Jack asks Larry if he ever thought of getting married, Larry replies, “Yeah, but the rabbit got better.”

== Sources ==
- Friedman, Maurice Harold; Lapham, Maxwell Edward (1931). "A Simple, Rapid Procedure for the Laboratory Diagnosis of Early Pregnancies". American Journal of Obstetrics and Gynecology. 21 (3): 405–410. doi:10.1016/s0002-9378(16)42174-5. Wikidata Q115596844.
