= Margaret Crane =

American biochemist

Margaret M. Crane
- Born: 1939 (age 86–87)
- Known for: Invention of the at-home pregnancy test
- Scientific career
- Fields: Graphic design, product design

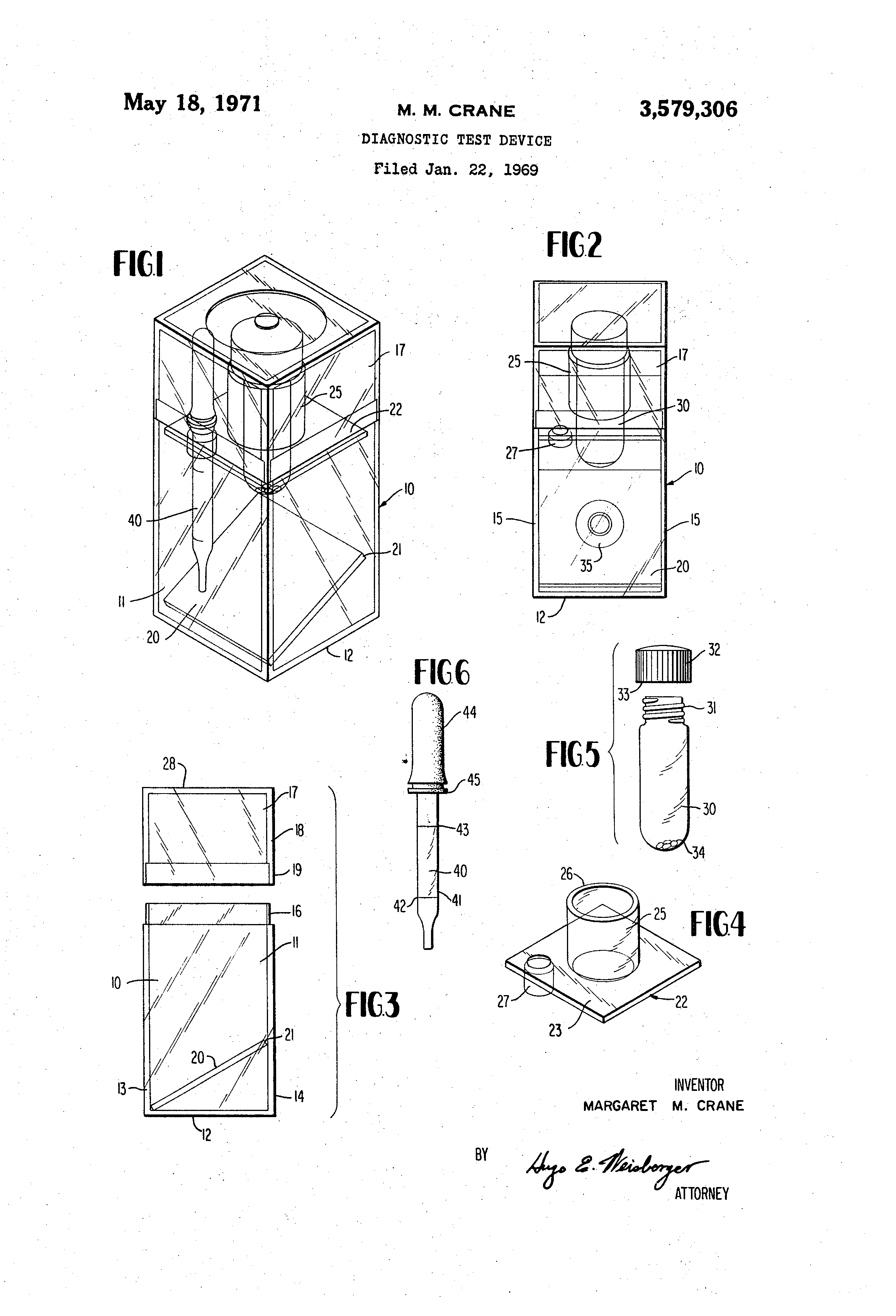
Margaret Crane's patent illustration for "Diagnostic Test Device", the first home pregnancy test

Margaret "Meg" M. Crane (born 1939) is an American inventor and graphic designer who created the first at home pregnancy test in 1967 while working at Organon Pharmaceuticals in West Orange, New Jersey. She is the listed inventor on US Patent 3,579,306 and 215,7774. There was resistance to marketing pregnancy tests for consumers rather than doctors, and the home pregnancy test did not become available until 1977, except for a market test in Canada in 1972.

She was also a juror in the 2004 trial of Martha Stewart for lying to federal investigators during an insider trading investigation.

== Career ==
At age 26, Crane was hired by Organon in 1967 to work on a new cosmetic line for the company. One day as she was touring the laboratory of the company she noticed many test tubes. Curious to what they were, she asked and to her surprise they were pregnancy tests. Each individual test tube contained reagents that when mixed with a pregnant woman's urine would indicate pregnancy by displaying a red ring at the bottom of the test tube.

Intrigued by this, Crane saw the possibility of this as a home pregnancy test. She thought it was easy enough to do that women could perform this test at home and in a quicker fashion. Crane had no previous background in science; however, she saw that making the pregnancy test an at-home and private experience was important and necessary. This inspired her to create her first model for the test, similar to the tests she observed in her lab. The model Crane proposed was sold across the United States in 1977.

Crane and her partner Ira Sturtevant, who aided Crane in her endeavors, went on to develop an advertisement and design firm called Ponzi & Weill.

=== Invention ===
Crane took matters into her own hands and went to her home in New York to begin working on her prototype. She combined a paper clip holder, a test tube, a mirror, and a dropper. She put her invention together and presented it to Organon but the idea was at first rejected. Nonetheless, they applied for patents in her name in 1969. When Crane presented her idea, it was met with major pushback. Crane's proposal made the lab hesitant due to concerns that the lab would lose sales to doctors if women started performing these tests at home.

Organon eventually decided to do a test market of the product and Margaret Crane's design was chosen. Organon hired a New York advertising agency to do the marketing, and Ira Sturtevant was to head the account. He took a particular interest in Margret Crane's prototype. He was intrigued by how elegantly the home pregnancy kit was put together. Organon chose Canada for the test market and Crane and Sturtevant were chosen to head the project. They went on to become partners for more than 40 years until his death in 2008. With success the pair went on to build their own marketing company named Ponzi and Weill.

This advertising-business partnership played an important role in the promotion of the pregnancy test. “Every woman has the right to know whether or not she is pregnant,” said an early ad for the test that women “can do by yourself, at home, in private, in minutes.”

This was Margaret Crane's biggest motivation to invent the at-home pregnancy kit. Before Crane's invention, women would have to go to a doctor and have their urine tested in a lab to determine if they were pregnant. As a result, women would have to wait weeks for results. In the 1960s, when Crane's idea first came to be, a pregnancy test was processed in a lab by monitoring levels of a hormone called human chorionic gonadotropin (hCG) in urine. It was discovered that women secrete high levels of hCG when pregnant. Therefore, if hCG was detected it indicated pregnancy.

Due to the Food and Drug Administration (FDA) rules for medical devices it took a while to receive approval for her prototype in the United States. The pregnancy test developed by Crane did not receive FDA approval until 1976. Crane's pregnancy test hit the market in 1977, ten years after she had first proposed her idea. It was marketed as “The Predictor”.

Although her name was on the patents for the device, Organon licensed the product to three over-the-counter pharmaceutical companies, and Crane never received a penny for her design. She had to sign away her rights for a dollar and never saw that dollar. But she was grateful to have met her partner in the process.

It was not until 2012, when the New York Times ran a short "Who Made It" story, that Crane received proper recognition for her prototype that simplified the pregnancy of many women. Crane saw that the column was about the history of pregnancy testing, but noticed that her name was not included in the article. She was hesitant to come forward because the article was discussing the modern version of the pregnancy test, but she emailed the author of the article. Since 2012, Crane has received recognition for her invention.

== Legacy ==
A prototype of The Predictor and a 1970 packaged product version were acquired by the Smithsonian’s National Museum of American History in 2015.

Predictor, a play by Jennifer Blackmer about Margaret Crane and her invention of the home pregnancy test, received its New York premiere in December 2025 starring Caitlin Kinnunen as Crane.
