= Judith Vaitukaitis =

Reproductive neuroendocrinologist

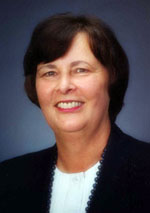
- Vaitukaitis in 2005
- Born: 1940 (age 85–86); Hartford, Connecticut
- Education: Tufts University
- Known for: Development of the home pregnancy test
- Scientific career
- Fields: human chorionic gonadotropin (hCG); endocrinology and metabolism
- Workplaces: Boston University School of Medicine; National Cancer Institute; Eunice Kennedy Shriver National Institute of Child Health and Human Development

Judith L. Vaitukaitis (August 29, 1940 – October 19, 2018) was a reproductive neuroendocrinologist and clinical researcher who played a key role in developing a biochemical assay in the early 1970s that ultimately led to the creation of the home pregnancy test. She served for 12 years as director of the US National Center for Research Resources (NCRR) at the US National Institutes of Health (NIH).

== Education and early development of home pregnancy test ==
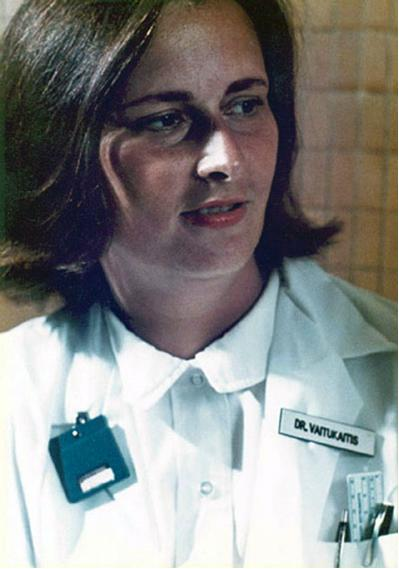
Judith Vaitukaitis, circa 1971, at the National Institutes of Health, where she helped to develop a sensitive test that ultimately led to creation of the home pregnancy test

Vaitukaitis was born in Hartford, Connecticut, and received a B.S. degree in chemistry and biology from Tufts University in 1962. She earned her M.D. degree in 1966 from Boston University School of Medicine. She completed her residency at Cornell Medical Services, Bellevue Memorial Hospital, New York.

In 1970, Vaitukaitis came to NIH as a postdoctoral researcher with the intention of studying human chorionic gonadotropin (hCG), a reproductive hormone that's also secreted by certain malignant tumors. She worked first at NIH's National Cancer Institute and then continued her postdoctoral training in the reproduction research branch of NIH's Eunice Kennedy Shriver National Institute of Child Health and Human Development (NICHD), first as a special research fellow of the U.S. Public Health Service and then as a senior staff fellow.

During that time, Vaitukaitis worked with another NIH postdoc, Glenn Braunstein, to find accurate techniques to detect elevated levels of hCG (human chorionic gonadotropin) in the body, as a method for diagnosing cancer. Because hCG is normally secreted during pregnancy as well, the researchers recognized that a sensitive hCG assay might also be able to detect pregnancy at an early stage. In 1972, Vaitukaitis, Braunstein, and their mentor Griff Ross published a landmark paper that described a new assay for detecting hCG. Their method, far more sensitive than existing hCG tests, became the basis for the first home pregnancy tests, which hit the market in 1978.

After advancing to become one of the first female senior investigators at NICHD, Vaitukaitis left NIH in 1974 and returned to Boston University School of Medicine.

== Clinical research and leadership roles ==
At Boston University, Vaitukaitis served as professor of medicine, and at Boston City Hospital, she headed the section on endocrinology and metabolism. In addition to teaching, she conducted clinical research in reproductive endocrinology, and her basic research examined the mechanisms controlling hormonal action and metabolism at the cellular level. Her clinical studies were conducted in the NIH-funded General Clinical Research Center (GCRC) at Boston University; she served as co-director of that GCRC from 1975 to 1977, and director from 1977 to 1986.

In 1986, Vaitukaitis returned to NIH as director of the General Clinical Research Centers (GCRC) program. At that time, the GCRC program was a nationwide network of more than 70 specialized centers in major teaching hospitals; each GCRC provided a well-equipped setting for physicians to conduct research on human health. Under her leadership, NCRR's budget nearly quadrupled, and programs expanded to include a broad range of research resources, technologies, and biological models of human disease. With her guidance, NCRR helped to expand training and mentoring opportunities for physician-scientists and patient-oriented researchers and broadened the range of services and technologies provided by the GCRCs. Under her watch, NCRR also tripled funding for construction of research facilities; helped to create three National Gene Vector Laboratories; expanded support of advanced biomedical technologies; and established NIH's Institutional Development Award (IDeA) Program, which broadened the geographic distribution of NIH funding for biomedical and behavioral research.

In March 2005, Vaitukaitis became senior advisor on scientific infrastructure and resources to then-NIH Director Elias Zerhouni. She retired shortly thereafter.

== Honors and awards ==
- Distinguished Alumna Award, Boston University (1983).
- Elected to the Institute of Medicine (1996).
