= Roy Courtnall Summerfield =

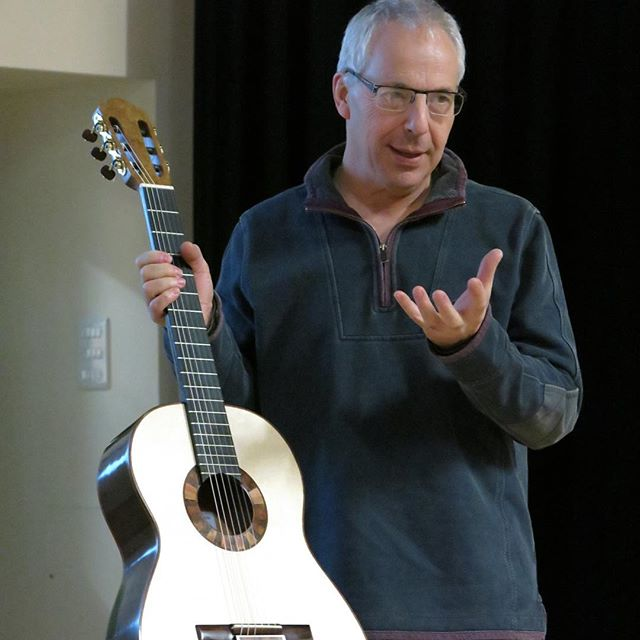
- Summerfield at the Leicester MusicFest, February 2018.
- Born: 31 December 1953 (age 72); Cape Town, South Africa
- Education: Woodmead School, Johannesburg; Abbotsholme School, Staffordshire; Goldsmiths College, University of London
- Occupations: Luthier, teacher, author
- Writing career
- Language: English
- Years active: guitar making:1985 - 2019; painting:2019 - present
- Genres: Lutherie; Fine art painting
- Subjects: Classical Guitar, Violin; Oil painting

Roy Summerfield (born Roy Shapiro) artist (painter and sculptor), luthier, author, teacher and lecturer in musical instrument technology.

== Education ==
At the age of 18 he relocated from his birth place in South Africa to the United Kingdom, studying for A levels at Abbotsholme School in Derbyshire (1972–73), before attending the University of London Goldsmiths College for a BA (Hons) degree in Fine Art Sculpture. It was during this period that his interest in building stringed musical instruments arose and he adopted Courtnall as a professional name, being a reference to the family name of his British great-grandfather who had taught him woodwork as a child. A family background in education may have encouraged his own interest in teaching guitar making as well as making instruments himself; his mother, Sonia Machanick, was an educational psychologist who founded Japari School, a special school in Johannesburg and his father, Hillel Abbe Shapiro was Professor of Forensic Medicine at the University of South Africa.

== Career ==
GUITAR (Classical, Flemenco and Spanish models): In 1994, Courtnall was commissioned by the Newark School of Violin Making in the United Kingdom to write the syllabus and set up a new course in Classical Guitar Making. After an initial intake of twelve students, the course rapidly expanded to become the leading vocational course in guitar making in the United Kingdom, now awarding a BA (Hons) Musical Instrument Craft qualification through the University of Hull. In 2008 he retired from Newark College.

Courtnall's work was initially focused on understanding and building instruments in the Spanish classical guitar tradition begun by Antonio de Torres during the 19th century and later perfected by Hermann Hauser, Daniel Friederich and Jose Romanillos. He then worked closely with the guitarist Rob Johns, to develop a lattice-braced concert guitar, influenced by, but not quite in the same vein as the Australian luthier Greg Smallman.

FINE ART (PAINTING): In recent years he has returned to his original interest in fine art - in particular, painting; being mostly still lifes in the Realism tradition, using his birth name of Roy Shapiro: https://royshapiroart.com/ He has exhibited at the Royal Academy Summer Exhibition, the Royal Society of British Artists and the Royal Institute of Oil Painters (both at the Mall Galleries London), and the Royal Birmingham Society of Artists.

== Publications ==
Courtnall's first book; Making Master Guitars, is a practical guide and historical summary of leading luthiers of the 19th and 20th centuries, enabling readers to make reasonably close replicas of their instruments. It includes detailed working drawings and plans of guitars by Antonio de Torres, Hermann Hauser, Robert Bouchet, Ignacio Fleta, Santos Hernandez, Hernandez and Aguado, Daniel Friederich and Jose Romanillos. In a review for Classical Guitar magazine, luthiers, Lipkin and Algranati, concluded that Courtnall had "combined the detailed work of the scholar with the practical insights of the craftsman." The book has since been translated into French and Japanese.

His second book, The Art of Violin Making, was co-written with the violin maker Chris Johnson and regarded by The Strad magazine as a "major contribution" to the violin-making bookshelf. It includes a foreword by Lord Yehudi Menuhin, who refers to the book as "Exhaustive in its detailed exposition of the process of construction, conceived as it is, by two disciples of a distinguished English achievement - the Newark School of Violin Making". The book follows a similar format to Making Master Guitars and is closely based on the violin making method taught at the Newark School. It has been translated into Chinese.
