= Hillel Abbe Shapiro =

South African forensic pathologist (b. 1909, d. 1984)

- Born: 2 February 1909; Somerset Strand, Cape Town
- Died: 31 October 1984 (aged 75)
- Occupation: forensic pathologist
- Spouse: Sonia Machanick
- Children: 4; Paul Shapiro, Janice Shapiro, Ian Shapiro and Roy Courtnall Summerfield

Hillel Abbe Shapiro (2 February 1909 – 31 October 1984) was a South African forensic pathologist with a range of specialisms in experimental physiology and forensic medicine. He was editor of medical journals, medical text books and a university lecturer.

== Early life and education ==
Hillel Abbe Shapiro

Hillel Shapiro's parents were Lithuanian Jewish immigrants to Cape Town, South Africa, and he was born and grew up in Somerset Strand where he attended Somerset West High School in the Cape Provence. Yiddish was the only language spoken by his parents, so Shapiro had to learn English and Afrikaans and he became fluent in both. After school matriculation, his linguistic interests led to him studying Latin and English at the University of Cape Town, graduating BA with distinction in English.

After this first degree, he studied for an MA in ethnology, social anthropology and archaeology, receiving first class passes in all these subjects, as well as the class medal in ethnology and archaeology and he worked at the False Bay coast on the excavation of kitchen middens at Gordon's Bay.

With a growing interest in archaeology, he enrolled on courses in human anatomy and biology. The Head of the Department of Zoology was Lancelot Hogben who suggested to Shapiro that his journey into biology would be more successful with a knowledge of physics and chemistry; so in 1930 Shapiro enrolled on the first year of the medical course.

He began biological experimentation while still a first-year medical student. By feeding thyroid glands to tadpoles, he observed the accelerated metamorphosis induced by this endocrine gland.

As a result of his research work carried out during the fifth year of medical study, he was in 1935 awarded the Science Research Scholarship of the Royal Commission (the 1851 Exhibition Science Research Scholarship). *

- From the Archives of the Royal Commission for the Exhibition of 1851 reference number RC/13/A/3/110: He left his medical training in South Africa to come to London to take up the scholarship. He started off at the London School of Economics and then moved to the National Institute for Medical Research, under the guidance of Sir Henry Dale. He worked on “the Endocrine basis of motor behaviour with special reference to the mating reflex: extension of this work to mammals including man” and “Changes in the human vaginal epithelium associated with ovulation and with pre-pubertal, adult and post-menopausal alterations in the sexual cycle.” In Feb 1937 he returned to Cape Town to hold the remaining time of his scholarship there, as his father had unexpectedly died and he needed to support his mother. He had also brought a supply of South African toads with him to London but he had almost run out of these and there would be a better supply in South Africa. The commission's Ninth Report to Parliament (RC/F/3/1/11) shows that there was usually one scholarship per annum awarded to South Africa in the 1930s.

He was the first South African medical student to be awarded this Science Research Scholarship. He undertook research at the Medical Research Council laboratories in London, under the guidance of the Nobel laureate Sir Henry Dale.

== Research ==
His medical training was a route into experimental physiology. His mentor Lancelot Hogben influenced him to pursue research. He was also guided by the advice of Harry Zwarenstein, with whom he was later to co-operate in developing the Xenopus laevis pregnancy test. But his initial research was into amphibian metabolism, with his Ph.D. awarded in 1933 for 'Studies in the calcium metabolism of the amphibian'.

=== Xenopus laevis pregnancy test controversy ===
The use of live South African female Xenopus frogs was common in Europe, the US and Australia from the 1930s and through the 1940s, 1950s and 1960s for testing human pregnancy.

This early pregnancy test had been developed by Shapiro and Zwarenstein and it worked by injecting the urine from a human female into the Xenopus laevis frog - the frog would ovulate if the urine had come from a pregnant woman.

In a report to the Royal Society of South Africa in October 1933, Shapiro and Zwarenstein announced that in the previous month they had successfully used Xenopus in 35 pregnancy tests. The following spring Nature carried their report. (Shapiro and Zwarenstein, 1933).

In addition, the test was used to diagnose chorion epithelioma and testicular tumours. The Shapiro–Zwarenstein pregnancy test received international recognition and Xenopus laevis frogs were exported all over the world from the Cape.

The 16 November 1946 edition of the British Medical Journal includes a letter to The BMJ from Shapiro and Zwarenstein clarifying that Hogben and his associates were retrospectively wrongly claiming credit for discovering the pregnancy test first.

On pages 45 and 46 of a review titled ‘The introduction of Xenopus laevis into developmental biology: of empire, pregnancy testing and ribosomal genes’ by John B. Gurdon of the Wellcome CRC Institute and Nick Hopwood of the Department of History and Philosophy of Science, University of Cambridge, the authors elaborate on this controversy in detail:

From page 46 of their review: 'In a preliminary report to the Royal Society of South Africa in October 1933, Shapiro and Zwarenstein announced that in the previous month they had successfully used Xenopus in 35 pregnancy tests. The following May 1934 Nature carried an excerpt from this report (Shapiro and Zwarenstein, 1933) '.

From page 45: 'Hogben's communication (1930) would later be taken to have shown in principle that Xenopus might be used as an indicator of the presence of gonadotrophins in the urine of pregnant women, but neither this nor the full report (Hogben et al., 1931) mentioned pregnancy testing. He appears initially to have had other priorities, and it was at the outset far from clear that it would prove possible to make Xenopus the test animal of choice.'

Edward Elkin attributed the pregnancy test to a number of researchers.

Jesse Olszynko-Gryn, in his 'Pregnancy testing in Britain, c.1900-67 : laboratories, animals and demand from doctors, patients and consumers', investigated the controversy in detail

== Career ==
On returning from London, Shapiro was employed as government pharmacologist of the Biological Control Laboratories at the Union Health Department in Cape Town. In 1939, he interrupted this employment to complete his medical studies, graduating M.B. Ch.B. in December that year.

He then moved to the health department's medico-legal laboratories as a forensic pathologist and in October 1943 he was elected Fellow of the Royal Society of South Africa and was a lecturer in medical jurisprudence at Cape Town University until 1948, when he left to take up the editorship of the South African Medical Journal.

He chaired numerous medical conferences and symposiums, including from 13 to 16 July 1968, the first Human Heart Transplantation Symposium in Cape Town that followed on soon after the first heart transplant had successfully been done by Christiaan Barnard on 3 December 1967. The latter part of his career mostly involved editing medical journals, consultant and expert witness work in criminal trials, and appearing for the surviving families in inquests into suspicious deaths of detainees in police custody during the Apartheid years.

== Family ==
Shapiro was married to educational psychologist Sonia Machanick, founder of Japari School, and they had four children, Janice, Paul, Roy and Ian. Together with his wife and a group of other parents, he was a founder of South Africa's first multi-racial high school, Woodmead School, which his two younger children then attended. Politically, he was a supporter of Helen Suzman and the Progressive Party (South Africa).

== Teaching, other appointments and honors ==
Council of the College of Medicine of South Africa: elected member, member of its Examinations and Credentials Committee, chairman and Convener of the Faculty of Forensic Medicine, Honorary Editor.

South African Medical and Dental Council: elected member of Executive Committee,

University of South Africa: Professor Extraordinarius of Forensic Medicine

University of Natal: Visiting professor of Forensic Medicine

University of the Witwatersrand: Honorary Lecturer in Psychiatry and Forensic Medicine

== Publications ==
A Note-book of Physiological Histology.

Medicine and health in developing Southern Africa

Pneumoconiosis proceedings of the international conference, Johannesburg, 1969

Medico-legal mythology and other forensic contributions

First South African Cancer Congress, Johannesburg, 21–25 August 1972 : proceedings

Story of pregnancy diagnosis

Proceedings

Proceedings, Verrigtinge

First South African Cancer Congress, Johannesburg, 21–25 August 1972 = Eerste Suid-Afrikaanse Kankerkongres : proceedings

Genetics and society

Euthanasia

Medical secrecy and the doctor-patient relationship

Professor Hillel Abbe Shapiro

Attitudes to clinical experimentation in South Africa : a symposium

Physiological histology; a practical handbook

Pneumoconiosis

Xenopus laevis. A bibliography. Compiled by H. Zwarenstein ... N. Sapeika ... H.A. Shapiro

Experience with human heart transplantation : proceedings of the Cape Town Symposium 13–16 July 1968

Forensic medicine : a guide to principles

Professional secrecy in South Africa : a symposium

The biological basis of the motor components of sexual behaviour in animals

Presentations

Rehabilitation : including the role of disease, disorder and disability : the College of Medicine of South Africa Third Interdisciplinary Symposium

The scope and practice of forensic medicine

Medical jurisprudence: guide 1 for Mju 400-K

Studies in the calcium metabolism of the amphibian

Symposium on enavid

The frog pregnancy test : the first of its kind in the world

Hillel Abbe Shapiro 1909-1948 : in memoriam

General Bibliography
