= Courtney Jung =

Political science professor and writer

- Education: Tufts University (MESc) Columbia University (MA) Yale University (PhD)

Courtney Jung is a professor at the Department of Political Science of the University of Toronto, where she holds the George Ignatieff Chair, Department of Political Science. Her research focuses on critical theory and identity formation at the intersection of contemporary political theory and comparative politics.

She held visiting positions at Central European University, Yale University, and University of Cape Town before joining the Department of Political Science at the University of Toronto.

== Awards ==
- National Endowment for the Humanities (2001–2002)
- Mellon Foundation (2002–2004)
- Fulbright New Century Scholars Program (2003)
- Social Sciences and Humanities Research Council (2009–2015)
- Jackman Humanities Institute (2017–2018)

== Publications ==
- Then I Was Black: South African Political Identities in Transition (Yale University Press, 2000)
- The Moral Force of Indigenous Politics: Critical liberalism and the Zapatistas (Cambridge University Press, 2008)
- Lactivism: how feminists and fundamentalists, hippies and yuppies, and physicians and politicians made breastfeeding big business and bad policy (Basic Books, 2015)
