= Curator ad litem =

A curator ad litem is a legal representative in Scots law and Roman-Dutch law appointed by a court to represent, during legal proceedings, the best interests of a person who lacks the mental capacity to make decisions for themselves. A curator may be appointed for a child or for a person who is mentally or physically incapacitated. The corresponding office in English common law is that of guardian ad litem.

The difference between a curator ad litem and an ordinary legal representative is that the curator does not have to follow the client's instructions, but must independently act in their best interest. In Scotland curators ad litem are usually solicitors; in South Africa they are usually advocates.

== See also ==
- Ad litem
- Legal guardian
- Guardian ad litem
- Curator bonis
