= Curator bonis =

Roman law guardian of property

In Scots and Roman-Dutch laws, a curator bonis is a legal representative appointed by a court to manage the finances, property, or estate of another person unable to do so because of mental or physical incapacity. The corresponding office in common law is that of conservator or guardian of the property.

The Adults with Incapacity (Scotland) Act 2000 provided that it would no longer be competent to appoint a curator bonis to a person who has attained the age of 16, with existing curators becoming guardians under that Act.

== See also ==
- Legal guardian
- Curator ad litem
