= Ian Shapiro =

American political scientist

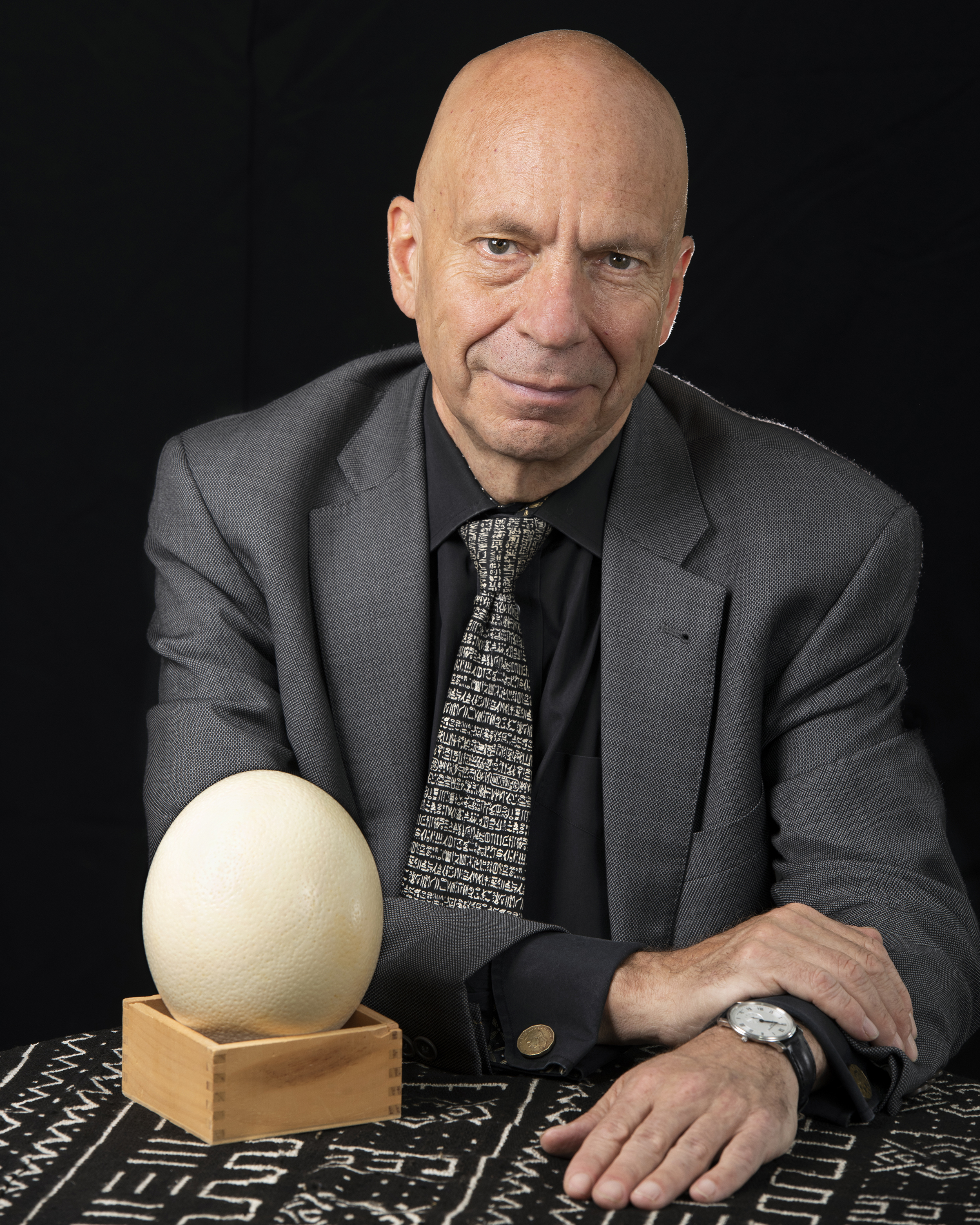
- Born: September 29, 1956 (age 70); Johannesburg, South Africa

Academic background
- Education: University of Bristol (BSc); Yale University (MPhil, PhD, JD)
- Doctoral advisor: Robert Dahl
- Other advisor: Michael Walzer

Academic work
- Discipline: Political science; political philosophy
- Sub-discipline: Democratic theory; political theory; theory of justice
- Institutions: Yale University

{{Infobox philosopher

Ian Shapiro (born September 29, 1956) is an American legal scholar and political scientist who serves as the Sterling Professor of Political Science at Yale University. He served as the Henry R. Luce Director of the MacMillan Center at Yale University from 2004 to 2019. He is known primarily for interventions in debates on democracy and on methods of conducting social science research.

In democratic theory, Shapiro has argued that democracy's value comes primarily from its potential to limit domination rather than, as is conventionally assumed, from its operation as a system of participation, representation, or preference aggregation. In debates about social scientific methods, he is chiefly known for rejecting prevalent theory-driven and method-driven approaches in favor of starting with a problem and then devising suitable methods to study it. Shapiro’s latest books—Uncommon Sense (2024), The Wolf at the Door (2020), and After the Fall (forthcoming)—diagnose the sources of today’s democratic crisis and advance realistic remedies. Uncommon Sense (Yale University Press, 2024) renews the Enlightenment commitments to reason and science as providing the best available framework for democratic politics; The Wolf at the Door (Harvard University Press, 2020, with Michael J. Graetz) offers a pragmatic program to reduce economic insecurity; and After the Fall (Basic Books, forthcoming) argues that post–Cold War decisions by Western leaders precipitated the current political crises in many democracies and maps out better paths that are available going forward.

== Life and career ==
Born in Johannesburg, South Africa on September 29, 1956, Shapiro is the youngest of four children. He was educated at St. Stithians School in Johannesburg (1963–68); St. Albans School in Pretoria (1969); and South Africa's first multiracial high school, Woodmead School in Rivonia (1970–72). At the age of 16, he left for the United Kingdom where he completed "O" and "A" levels at Abbotsholme School in Derbyshire (1972–75). This was during South Africa's Border War and South Africa required compulsory military service, which would mean complicity in the enforcement of Apartheid.

Shapiro chose to remain in Britain to read philosophy and politics at the University of Bristol, receiving his B.Sc. (Hons) in 1978. Then he left for the United States and enrolled in Yale University's Ph.D. program in political science, obtaining a M.Phil. in 1980 and a Ph.D., with distinction, in 1983 for his dissertation entitled “The Evolution of Rights in Liberal Political Thought: A Realist Account," which won the Leo Strauss Prize awarded by the American Political Science Association in 1985. At Yale, Shapiro was a student of the important theorist of pluralism and democracy, Robert Dahl, though his work also shows the influence of Douglas Rae and Michael Walzer, who served as an external adviser of his thesis. Shapiro went on to the Yale Law School, earning a J.D. in 1987.

Shapiro was appointed to the department of political science as an assistant professor. He was promoted to a full professor in 1992, and named the William R. Kenan Jr. Professor in 2000, and Sterling Professor of Political Science in 2005.

Shapiro served as the Henry R. Luce Director of the MacMillan Center at Yale University from 2004 to 2019. He was elected to the American Academy of Arts and Sciences in 2000, the American Philosophical Society in 2008, and the Council on Foreign Relations in 2009. He is a past fellow of the Carnegie Corporation, the Guggenheim Foundation, and the Center for Advanced Study in the Behavioral Sciences. He has held visiting appointments at the University of Cape Town, Nuffield College, Oxford and Keio University in Tokyo.

== Scholarly work ==
=== Early work ===
Shapiro's early work explores existing theoretical frameworks for the study of politics. In books such as The Evolution of Rights in Liberal Theory (1986), Political Criticism (1990) and Democracy’s Place (1996), Shapiro engaged with the liberal, communitarian, and democratic theories which dominated political theory at that time.

The Evolution of Rights in Liberal Theory (1986) examined the changing place of individual rights in liberal political thinking from the seventeenth century on. The book poses the questions: why did particular modes of talking about rights take hold around the English Civil War; how and why have they changed in the ways that they have; and how do they animate and constrain contemporary politics? Shapiro traces liberal political ideology through four major moments, bound to larger economic and social transformations, which he dubs transitional, classical, neo-classical, and Keynesian. Each is explored by reference to an emblematic theorist: Thomas Hobbes, John Locke, Robert Nozick, and John Rawls.

Skeptical of the claims of postmodernists, like Richard Rorty, that our intellectual commitments are contingent and, hence, subject to voluntary endorsement and revision, Shapiro argues that “[m]any of our most fundamental philosophical beliefs are integral to social practices in which we engage unreflectively every day. Those beliefs are required, in nontrivial ways, by those social practices, thus generating an important limitation on how we might reasonably expect beliefs to change.... We need to take much better account of our actual circumstances, how they have come to be what they are, and how they influence our own values and actions, if we are seriously to argue for the pursuit of significantly different values in the contemporary political world.”

Shapiro argues that “the liberal view of rights evolved via processes of adaptive change importantly conditioned by and functional to the evolution of capitalist markets”. Shifts in epistemological frameworks from the 17th to the 20th centuries demonstrate how this kind of adaptation functions. For example, because their epistemologies are not yet plagued by Humean skeptical worries, Hobbes and Locke were able to assume that each of us, as autonomous agents, would opt for a set of rights coextensive with an ‘objectively right’ set of rights, our universal moral ends. After Hume, this assumption is no longer tenable. Shapiro argued that attempts to adapt the way we talk about rights to these new conditions of post-Humean skepticism sometimes resulted in incoherence. Later theorists of rights like Nozick and Rawls try to make up for this by means of a resort to economic assumptions (for Nozick, neo-classical in origin; for Rawls, Keynesian). These provide an apparently objective anchor for subjective aims. Shapiro concludes, “The principal reasons for the tenacity of the liberal conception of individual rights, its negative libertarian view of the substance of rights, its view of individual consent as the legitimate basis of rights, and its essentially pluralist and utilitarian conception of the purposes of rights have, in their various formulations, combined to express a view of politics that is required by and legitimates capitalist market practices.”

In Political Criticism, Shapiro continues to explore the theme of managing modernity’s loosened objectivity. Here, Shapiro engages political frameworks articulated in opposition to Rawls’s neo-Kantian foundationalism, including the anti-foundationalist work of Richard Rorty, J.G.A. Pocock, Michael Walzer, Alasdair MacIntyre, and Allan Bloom. These thinkers attempted to ground morality in varieties of convention, tradition, and intersubjectivity. Essentially, they hoped to justify ethical and political claims through context, borrowing the insights of W.V.O. Quine’s epistemological holism. Ultimately, Shapiro criticizes these attempts because they “commit the fallacy of identifying one bad kind of foundational argument with all attempts to provide adequate foundations for our beliefs.” In lieu of these flawed alternatives (foundationalism and contextualism), Shapiro recommends a third way, termed “critical naturalism,” which rests on a commitment to pragmatic realism. Drawing on a modified Aristotelianism, Shapiro constructs a notion of an authentic and integrated life as the goal of politics.

In Democracy’s Place, Shapiro collects a number of essays, which together complete the critique and groundwork for his theory of democracy. Here, he explores the question of how “democratic ways of doing things can be made to fit well with other human values, better to shape the ways in which people pursue their collective goals.” To this end, Shapiro engages a variety of approaches to the study of democratic politics. These include public choice theory, contract theories, neo-Kantian foundationalism, and neo-Schumpeterian interest-based approaches (here, in particular, with respect to South Africa's transition to inclusive democracy). Shapiro's concern is to develop a pragmatic political ethics which takes people and institutions as they are, in imagining what they might become. With that in view, it is in this book that he begins to sketch the outlines of his theory of democratic justice. Taking a cue from Michael Walzer's 'Spheres of Justice' Shapiro argues for a “semi-contextualized” approach to the study and pursuit of justice. It varies over time and over the different realms of human social interaction.

In these early, primarily critical, books, Shapiro explores the relationship between justice and democracy and with the realities of politics and pragmatic means of overcoming injustice. In his next book, Democratic Justice (1999), which some scholars rank among the four or five most important books since Rawls's A Theory of Justice, Shapiro begins the systematic articulation of his mature constructive theory.

=== Justice and democratic theory ===
In Democratic Justice, Shapiro argues that democracy and justice are often mutually antagonistic ideas, but are nonetheless best pursued together. This is partly for pragmatic political reasons. Justice must be sought democratically to be legitimate in the modern world, he argues, and democracy must be justice-promoting if it is to hold our allegiance over time. But, in addition to these political considerations, Shapiro contends that there is a philosophical link between justice and democracy, rooted in the fact that the most plausible accounts of both ideals involve commitments to the idea of non-domination. Power and hierarchy are endemic to human interaction. This means domination is an ever-present possibility. The challenge is to find ways to limit domination while minimizing interference with legitimate hierarchies and power relations.

This leads Shapiro to his claim that democracy is a subordinate or conditioning good: one that shapes the terms of human interaction without thereby determining its course. Pursuing democratic justice involves deferring, where possible, to what Shapiro describes as insiders' wisdom. By this he means encouraging people to democratize - for themselves - the collective pursuit of the things they value. Imposed solutions are unlikely to be as effective as those designed by insiders, and their legitimacy will always be in question. They are solutions of last resort. When adopted, they are best pursued indirectly and designed to minimize interference with peoples’ pursuit of other human goods.

In the applied chapters of Democratic Justice, Shapiro suggests how this can be done in different phases of the human life cycle, from childhood through the adult worlds of work and domestic life, retirement, old age, and approaching death. Shapiro spells out the implications of his account for debates about authority over children, the law of marriage and divorce, abortion and population control, the workplace, basic incomes guarantees, health insurance, retirement policies, and decisions made by and for the infirm elderly.

His arguments about democracy have been developed further in The State of Democratic Theory (2003) and The Real World of Democratic Theory (2011). The latter includes a response to critics of the theory of democratic justice and a sketch of additional projected volumes on public institutions and democracy and distribution.

An elaboration of the argument's philosophical underpinnings is set out in “On Non-Domination.” In "On Non-Domination," Shapiro works through the alternative positions of Rawls, Walzer, Foucault, Habermas, Pettit, and Skinner, in addition to making his own substantive arguments about justice as nondomination, in order to "defend a view of non-domination as providing a better basis for justice than the going alternatives." Shapiro builds on this work on nondomination in "Against Impartiality," in which he argues that political theorists should focus on ways to identify and alleviate domination rather than unequivocally defending impartiality.

Shapiro further expands upon these arguments and more in his major work of applied political theory Politics Against Domination, in which he makes presents a case that the overriding purpose of politics should be to combat domination. In addition to taking a more theoretical approach to the topic, Shapiro discusses the implications of this work for ongoing debates on electoral systems, independent courts, money in politics, minimum wages, and the vulnerabilities of minorities. Utilizing evidence from the battle against slavery, the creation of modern welfare states, the civil rights movement, Occupy Wall Street, the Tea Party, and the worldwide campaign against sweatshops, among other sources, Shapiro delves into the making of effective coalitions for political change and how best to press them into the service of resisting domination - culminating in the motivating argument that individuals may reasonably hope to devise ways to combat domination.

Shapiro has also worked on issues related to transitions from authoritarianism to democracy. In several papers written with Courtney Jung and others, he has developed an account of the conditions that make negotiated transitions to democracy more and less likely to occur, addressing also the question of how they can be made sustainable when they do occur. This work has generated substantial scholarly debate. Turning to the matter of leadership in "Transforming Power Relationships: Leadership, Risk, and Hope," Shapiro and coauthor James H. Read identify three major characteristics of successful, risk-embracing leadership. Shapiro and Read state that such leadership is exemplified by Nelson Mandela and F. W. de Klerk during South Africa's transition to democracy, and further discuss leadership successes and failures in the cases of Northern Ireland and the Israeli-Palestinian conflict. In his more recent work on democratic politics, "Collusion in Restraint of Democracy: Against Political Deliberation," Shapiro highlights that rather than improving political outcomes, deliberation instead undermines competition over proposed political programs. He therefore asserts that political outcomes may instead be improved by "restoring meaningful competition between representatives of two strong political parties over the policies that, if elected, they will implement."

Additionally, Shapiro has written on the negative consequences of devolving political power to the grassroots level in modern democracies. In his work coauthored with Frances McCall Rosenbluth, Responsible Parties: Saving Democracy from Itself, Shapiro and Rosenbluth explore how popular democracies have eroded trust in political systems worldwide. This devolution of power to the grassroots is reflected in changing methods of candidate selection and increased amounts of ballot initiatives and referendums, as well as the increased use of proportional representation across democracies. Although these reforms are intended to bring politics closer to the people, they instead produce diminished trust in politicians, parties, and democratic institutions - culminating most recently in major populist victories in democracies, including the United States and the United Kingdom. Highlighting that transferring power to the grass roots is part of the problem rather than a solution, Shapiro and Rosenbluth argue that decentralizing political decision-making effectively weakens political parties, thereby making governments less effective and less able to adequately address the long-term interests of their constituents. This subject also represents an ongoing joint project conducted by Shapiro and Rosenbluth, among others, at the Jackson Institute for Global Affairs at Yale University.

In his more recently published Uncommon Sense, Shapiro argues that growing despair about politics stems from misdiagnosing the Enlightenment’s failures: critics blame “Enlightenment reason” for political dysfunction when the real problem is that we have abandoned its core commitments to empirical inquiry and institutional experimentation. He advances a comparative thesis: that nondomination—minimizing arbitrary, unaccountable power—provides a superior organizing principle for democracy than rival theoretical projects; then he presents the Enlightenment as providing a practical toolkit for building institutions that minimize domination. Shapiro frames this book as a sober response to “dark political times,” insisting that scientific reasoning and iterative reform are indispensable if democracies are to endure.

=== Methods and the human sciences ===
In several articles and books Shapiro has defended distinctive accounts of the nature of social scientific knowledge, the best means of acquiring it, and its implications for political philosophy.

In Pathologies of Rational Choice Theory, Shapiro and co-author Donald Green took on the reigning method in the social sciences: the use of rational choice models derived from neoclassical economics to explain, predict, and interpret political action. They argued that, if rational choice theorists are going to claim to provide compelling explanations, they should also have solid predictive value — or at least they should do better than the going alternatives. By reviewing the results of rational choice models in several key areas of political science, including voting behavior, collective action, legislative behavior, and spatial theories of elections, Green and Shapiro concluded that rational choice theory has achieved a great deal less than it claims. Indeed, they claim that it cannot achieve what it set out to, because, like all universalist theories, it treats all objects of study as though they were of the same type. Universalism inevitably results in what Shapiro calls ‘method driven’ rather than ‘problem driven’ social science. “Hypotheses are formulated in empirically intractable ways: evidence is selected and tested in a biased fashion; conclusions are drawn without serious attention to competing explanations; empirical anomalies and discordant facts are often either ignored or circumvented by way of post hoc alterations to deductive arguments...” These issues “generate and reinforce a debilitating syndrome in which theories are elaborated and modified in order to save their universal character, rather than by reference to the requirements of viable empirical testing. When this syndrome is at work, data no longer test theories: instead, theories continually impeach and elude data. In short, empirical research becomes theory driven rather than problem driven, designed more to save or vindicate some variant of rational choice theory rather than to account for any specific set of political phenomena.”

In effect Green and Shapiro argue that rational choice methodology, which had become dominant in political science by the 1980s, was driven to “...[save]... universalist theory from discordant encounters with reality.” Rational choice theory, they argued, rests on unsubstantiated assumptions about political reality. When these assumptions are scrutinized and tested empirically, they are all too often been found to be false. And when rational choice theory generates explanations that are true and predictive, typically such explanations turn out to be banal, obvious, and hence of little merit on that count.

Pathologies generated considerable critical attention from all quarters in the political science discipline, some of which spilled over into the realm of public debate. This work has been credited with fostering the reinvigoration of systematic empirical research in the political science discipline.

In The Flight from Reality in the Human Sciences, Shapiro takes a systematic look at the many ways in which the human sciences have lost sight of their objects of study, confusing apparent methodological rigor with accuracy. This matters, he argues, because the conclusions that result, even while resting on assumptions divorced from reality, can profoundly impact real outcomes. Through inefficacy, for example, this kind of social science can neuter social criticism. Along with a critique of the method-driven strategies embraced by rational choice theorists, interpretivists, and others, Shapiro offers a defense of epistemological realism. He defines realism as resting on a twofold conviction: “that the world is comprised of causal mechanisms that exist independently of our study — or sometimes even awareness — of them, and that the methods of science hold out the best possibility of our grasping their true character.” He explores its implications both for explanation in the human sciences and for normative debates which, he argues, should be conducted in closer proximity to one another than is typically the case. For instance, if we are concerned with reducing injustice in the world, we should investigate both the philosophical character of justice as well as the conditions in the world that shape people's ideas about it.

=== Policy issues ===
In Democracy's Place, Shapiro said “...I think inquiry most likely to be fruitful if we start with first-order problems and engage higher-order commitments only to the degree necessary to tackle them.” Shapiro has engaged concrete policy issues in three works of applied political theory. Abortion: The Supreme Court Decisions, provides an extended analysis and annotation of the political and legal debate on abortion in the United States since the 1960s. Death by A Thousand Cuts: The Fight Over Taxing Inherited Wealth (coauthored with Michael Graetz) and Containment: Rebuilding a Strategy Against Global Terror.

In Death by A Thousand Cuts, Graetz and Shapiro explore new evidence that bears on the old question: In democracies, why don't the poor soak the rich? The prospect that, if given the vote, the poor would use it to do just that dominated nineteenth-century debates about expanding the franchise. It is also predicted by the median voter theorem in political science. In fact, majorities in democracies sometimes support regressive changes in distribution, which is to say the poor sometimes vote for measures that will increase the wealth of the richest members of society at their own expense. This was the case with the broad bipartisan support for repealing the estate tax, which had been on the books since 1916, as part of President Bush's 2001 tax cut. This tax was paid by the wealthiest two percent of taxpayers; half by the wealthiest half of one percent. Yet polls revealed large majorities consistently favored getting rid of it, and the legislation to repeal the tax won strong bipartisan backing in both houses of Congress. Finding few useful insights in the political science or economics literatures to account for this, Graetz and Shapiro undertook a micro-study of the estate-tax repeal's legislative success. Based on 150 interviews with congressmen, senators, staffers, civil servants, lobbyists, activists, think tank researchers, and pollsters involved on both sides of the repeal effort, they distilled a picture of “how power and politics actually operate in Washington today.”

The book develops a number of insights about what makes redistributive coalitions more and less effective in American politics, underscoring the complex pluralism of power in America and the role of moral commitments in animating lived political experience. It also provides insights into the ways in which Americans understand and make decisions about their interests. They argue that interest groups can radically change politicians behavior without substantively changing public opinion. In the case of the estate tax, interest groups were able to recast public opinion by employing priming and non-neutral wording in opinion polls. While public opinion did not change, the politicians’ perceptions of public opinion radically shifted and with it, their understanding of which actions were politically safe. This provides a partial explanation for the way that democracies can generate upward redistribution, contrary to what we might have assumed were the “objective” interests of the majority.

Graetz and Shapiro were to have received the 2006 Sidney Hillman award for the book, but the award was revoked at the last minute due to allegations that Shapiro had intimidated graduate student assistants during a union campaign at Yale in 1995, which an administrative court later found to be an illegal partial strike. The Hillman award is sponsored by a labor union, UNITE-HERE, which represents clerical and technical workers at Yale and serves as the parent organization of the Graduate Employees and Students Organization (GESO). Shapiro expressed regret over the withdrawal of the award and noted that the administrative law judge dismissed claims against Yale stemming from the 1995 strike, so the allegations against him were never adjudicated.

In the wake of America's foreign policy decisions in the first decade of the 21st century and their consequences, Shapiro wrote Containment. This was a critique both of the neoconservative Bush doctrine, which gained ascendency following the 9/11 attacks, and of the Democrats for their failure to articulate an alternative. Beginning from the claim that, “in electoral politics, you can’t beat something with nothing”, Shapiro spelled out an approach to foreign affairs in the post 9/11 age based on an adaptation of George Kennan's cold-war containment strategy. Containment, rather than aggressive regime change, is preferable from a principled perspective because it is more democratic to leave countries to choose (or refuse) democracy on their own, consistent with Shapiro's insistence on the importance of ‘insider wisdom’ in achieving just outcomes. But furthermore, aggressive foreign wars are expensive in terms of monetary and political capital, and have costs in terms of foreign reputation also. Even a trans-border threat like organized terror, he argues, can be most effectively contained by pressuring host countries. Kennan's defense of containment had been strategic all the way down, but Shapiro argues that the doctrine's imperative to ratchet up only enough coercive force to stop the bully, without yourself becoming a bully, embodies the central commitment to resisting domination that gives the democratic ideal its normative appeal.

In another work coauthored with Michael Graetz,The Wolf at the Door: The Menace of Economic Insecurity and How to Fight It, Shapiro argues that Americans are more concerned with their own economic insecurity than they are about inequality - calling attention to the fact that Americans are most afraid losing what they already have, whether it be jobs, status, or safe communities. Therefore, Shapiro and Graetz posit that the solution to economic insecurity is a return to the hard work of building coalitions around realistic goals and pursuing them doggedly through the political system - providing evidence of the success of this tactic in earlier reforms, such as in the cases of the abolition of the slave trade and the pursuit of civil rights legislation. Additionally, Shapiro and Graetz offer concrete, achievable reforms that would make Americans more secure, and offer substantial recommendations for how to increase employment, improve wages, protect families suffering from unemployment, and provide better social services such as health insurance and child care.

Shapiro’s new book, After the Fall: From the End of History to the Crisis of Democracy, How Politicians Broke our World (Basic Books, forthcoming 2026), studies political and policy decisions since 1989. It examines NATO’s post–Cold War trajectory, the Global War on Terror, humanitarian intervention, and the economic governance of Western democracies in the evolving contexts of the 9/11 attacks and the 2008 financial crisis and its downstream consequences. Shapiro argues that these choices drove declining public confidence in mainstream parties and institutions, strengthened anti-system actors, and precipitated renewed great-power confrontations. The book surveys cases in the United States, Britain and multiple European countries, excavating paths not taken that were debated at the time and spells out better options going forward.

=== Other work ===
Shapiro edited NOMOS, the yearbook of the American Society for Political and Legal Philosophy, for eight years, as well as a number of other collections of scholarly work. Shapiro has also contributed to the “Arts and Ideas” section of The New York Times, and journals like Dissent and Critical Review. He produces occasional op-ed pieces, too. In addition, Shapiro has published The Moral Foundations of Politics (2003). This book grew from a popular undergraduate course which Shapiro has taught at Yale University for decades. It explores three common kinds of answers to the question: “Who is to judge, and by what criteria, whether the laws and actions of states that claim our allegiance measure up?” Through examining the utilitarian, Marxist, and social contract traditions, Shapiro aims to demonstrate both the common roots of the 20th century's dominant modes of thinking about political legitimacy and the pragmatic consequences of the operationalization of these traditions. In the final chapters, he engages with contemporary critiques of the Enlightenment, arguing that even if we could reject the ideas and principles that commonly animated the political thought of that time, it would be to our detriment to do so. Shapiro offers a defense of what he describes as the mature Enlightenment. Its core commitments are to a fallibilist view of science and the political importance of individual freedom as realized through representative institutions.

Shapiro also served as the instructor for Moral Foundations of Politics, an introductory course on political philosophy offered on Coursera by Yale University since January 2015. It is "a survey of the major political theories of the Enlightenment" and also deals with contemporary issues in modern-day politics. The course aims to answer the central question: "When do governments deserve our allegiance, and when should they be denied it?". As of 23 January 2022, 173,901 learners have enrolled in the course.

Shapiro is co-chair of the executive committee of the Future of American Democracy Foundation, a nonprofit, nonpartisan foundation in partnership with Yale University Press and the MacMillan Center for International and Area Studies, "dedicated to research and education aimed at renewing and sustaining the historic vision of American democracy."

== Works ==
- Shapiro, Ian (1986). The Evolution of Rights in Liberal Theory. Cambridge University Press. ISBN 978-0-521-33853-0.
- — (1992) [1990]. Political Criticism. University of California Press. ISBN 978-0-520-08032-4.
- Green, Donald; — (1996) [1994]. Pathologies of Rational Choice Theory: A Critique of Applications in Political Science. Yale University Press. ISBN 978-0-300-06636-4.
- — (1996). Democracy's Place. Cornell University Press. ISBN 978-1-5017-1823-6.
- — (1999). Democratic Justice. Yale University Press. ISBN 978-0-300-08908-0.
- — (2012) [2003]. The Moral Foundations of Politics. Yale University Press. ISBN 978-0-300-18545-4.
- — (2009) [2005]. The State of Democratic Theory. Princeton University Press. ISBN 978-1-4008-2589-9.
- — (2009) [2005]. The Flight from Reality in the Human Sciences. Princeton University Press. ISBN 978-1-4008-2690-2.
- Graetz, Michael J.; — (2011) [2006]. Death by a Thousand Cuts: The Fight over Taxing Inherited Wealth. Princeton University Press. ISBN 978-1-4008-3918-6.
- — (2009) [2007]. Containment: Rebuilding a Strategy against Global Terror. Princeton University Press. ISBN 978-1-4008-2756-5.
- — (2010). The Real World of Democratic Theory. Princeton University Press. ISBN 978-1-4008-3683-3.
- — (2016). Politics against Domination. Harvard University Press. ISBN 978-0-674-97006-9.
- Shapiro, Ian; McCall Rosenbluth, Frances (2018). Responsible Parties: Saving Democracy from Itself. Yale University Press. ISBN 978-0300241051.
- Graetz, Michael J.; — (2020). The Wolf at the Door: The Menace of Economic Insecurity and How to Fight It. Harvard University Press. ISBN 978-0-674-98088-4.
- — (2024). Uncommon Sense. Yale University Press. ISBN 9780300272574.
