= Tara Psychiatric Hospital =

South African psychiatric hospital founded in 1945

Tara The H Moross Psychiatric Hospital
- Gauteng Department of Health

Geography
- Location: Hurlingham, Johannesburg, Gauteng, South Africa
- Coordinates: 26°06′29″S 28°02′18″E

Organisation
- Care system: Public
- Type: Psychiatric
- Affiliated university: University of the Witwatersrand

History
- Opened: 1945

Tara Psychiatric Hospital is a public psychiatric hospital in Hurlingham, Sandton, Gauteng. It is situated to the north of the Johannesburg city centre.

== History ==
In its original form, Tara was a large estate north of the Johannesburg CBD. During the Second World War, it was occupied by the Red Cross and was a plastic surgery unit. That role ended in 1945 and as the Department of Defence needed to move 150 military psychiatric patients when the Potchefstroom Military Hospital was closed that year, so a decision was made to transfer them to Tara. It was run by the military from November 1945 until September 1946.

In September 1946, with the Transvaal Provincial authorities required a psychiatric hospital for civilians, this site was hand over to them to be managed by the Johannesburg General Hospital. In the 1950s, medical, surgical, and neurosurgical sections were opened.
