= Selmar Aschheim =

German gynecologist (1878–1965)

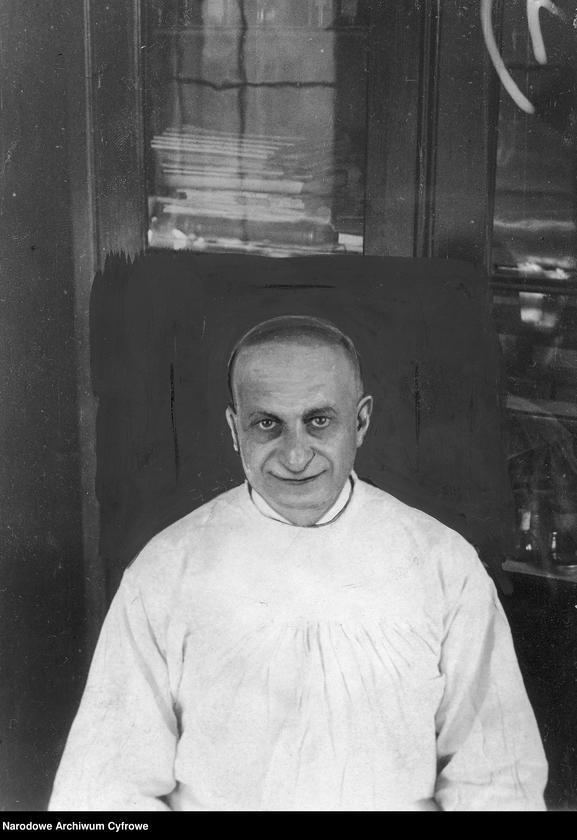
- Aschheim in 1931
- Born: 4 October 1878; Berlin, German Empire
- Died: 15 February 1965 (aged 86)
- Occupation: gynecologist
- Known for: rabbit test

Selmar Aschheim (4 October 1878 – 15 February 1965) was a German gynecologist.

Born into a Jewish family in Berlin, in 1902 he received a doctorate of medicine in Freiburg, and later became director of the laboratory of the Universitäts-Frauenklinik at the Berlin Charité. In 1930 Aschheim attained the chair of biological research in gynecology at the University of Berlin. In 1933 he fled Nazi Germany and moved to Paris, where he worked in medical research at the Hôpital Beaujon.

Aschheim was a specialist concerning gynecological histology and hormone research. In 1928 with endocrinologist Bernhard Zondek (1891–1966), he isolated the gonadotropic hormone known as human chorionic gonadotropin (hCG), which was discovered in the urine of pregnant women. From their research the "Aschheim-Zondek test" for pregnancy was created, which involved injection of a patient's urine into an immature laboratory mouse. If the rodent displayed an estrous reaction, it represented a positive indication of pregnancy.

The two doctors published the findings of the hormone in a treatise titled Das Hormon des Hypophysenvorderlappens. At the time they believed that the gonadotrophin was produced by the anterior pituitary, however further research in the 1940s demonstrated that the placenta was responsible for the elaboration of the hormone.
