= Bernhard Zondek =

German-Israeli endocrinologist

- ברנרד צונדק
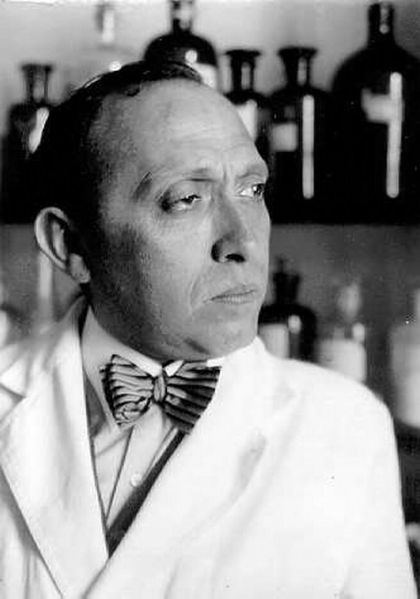
- Born: 29 July 1891; Wronke, Province of Posen, German Empire (now Wronki, Poland)
- Died: 8 November 1966 (aged 75); New York, United States
- Known for: A-Z pregnancy test

Bernhard Zondek (Hebrew: ברנרד צונדק; 29 July 1891 – 8 November 1966) was a German-born Israeli gynecologist who developed the first reliable pregnancy test in 1928.

== Biography ==
Bernhard Zondek was born in Wronke, Germany, now Wronki, Poland. He studied medicine in Berlin, graduating in 1919. He worked under Karl Franz at the university women's clinic in Berlin Charité, where he specialized in obstetrics and gynecology. His older brother, Hermann Zondek, was a professor at the Humboldt University of Berlin and a pioneer of modern endocrinology.

== Medical career ==
=== Germany ===
In 1926, he became ausserordentlicher Professor, and in 1929, chief physician of the obstetrics and gynecology ward at the municipal hospital of Berlin-Spandau. When the Nazis came to power in 1933, he was dismissed from his posts.

=== Sweden ===
He left Germany for Stockholm, where he applied for permission to work as a physician in Sweden. Meanwhile, he started working as an unpaid scientist at the Biochemical Institute of Stockholm University. In September 1934 he turned directly to the Swedish king to get a practitioner's license. The Swedish Medical Association were asked for their opinion, and while a narrow majority voted to grant him permission for scientific work only (excluding him from clinical practice), the rest wanted to deny him permission altogether. When the media reported on the case, the chairman of the medical association wrote pieces discrediting Zondek and casting suspicion upon him in the media, and a protest against Zondek gathered over 1,000 practitioners' signatures, amounting to a third of the Swedish physicians. These expressions of hostility and Jew-hatred from his colleagues made Zondek decide that he could not stay in Sweden.

=== Israel ===
In the fall of 1934, he immigrated to Mandatory Palestine, where he was appointed professor of obstetrics and gynecology at the Hebrew University of Jerusalem, and head of obstetrics and gynecology at Hadassah Hospital. He served as president of the Jerusalem Academy of Medicine. He retired from teaching and patient care in 1961, and devoted his time to private study.

== Medical discoveries ==
Zondek was one of the proponents of the inter-dependence of the endocrine glands under the control of the pituitary. His studies on pituitary-ovary interaction were instrumental in establishing this fundamental tenet. He discovered that the chorionic tissue of the placenta had endocrine capacity and this led to diagnostic techniques important for the recognition and treatment of hydatidiform mole and chorionic carcinoma.

His work with the gynecologist Selmar Aschheim led to his bioassay for human chorionic gonadotropin, originally using mice, known as the Aschheim-Zondek or A-Z test. Later variations on this test used rabbits or amphibians, leading to the phrase "the rabbit died" to describe the discovery of a new pregnancy using the rabbit test.

== Awards and recognition ==
- In 1956, Zondek received the Solomon Bublick Award of the Hebrew University of Jerusalem.
- In 1958, he was awarded the Israel Prize, in medicine.

== See also ==
- List of Israel Prize recipients
- Health care in Israel
