= Gestational trophoblastic disease =

Pregnancy-related tumours

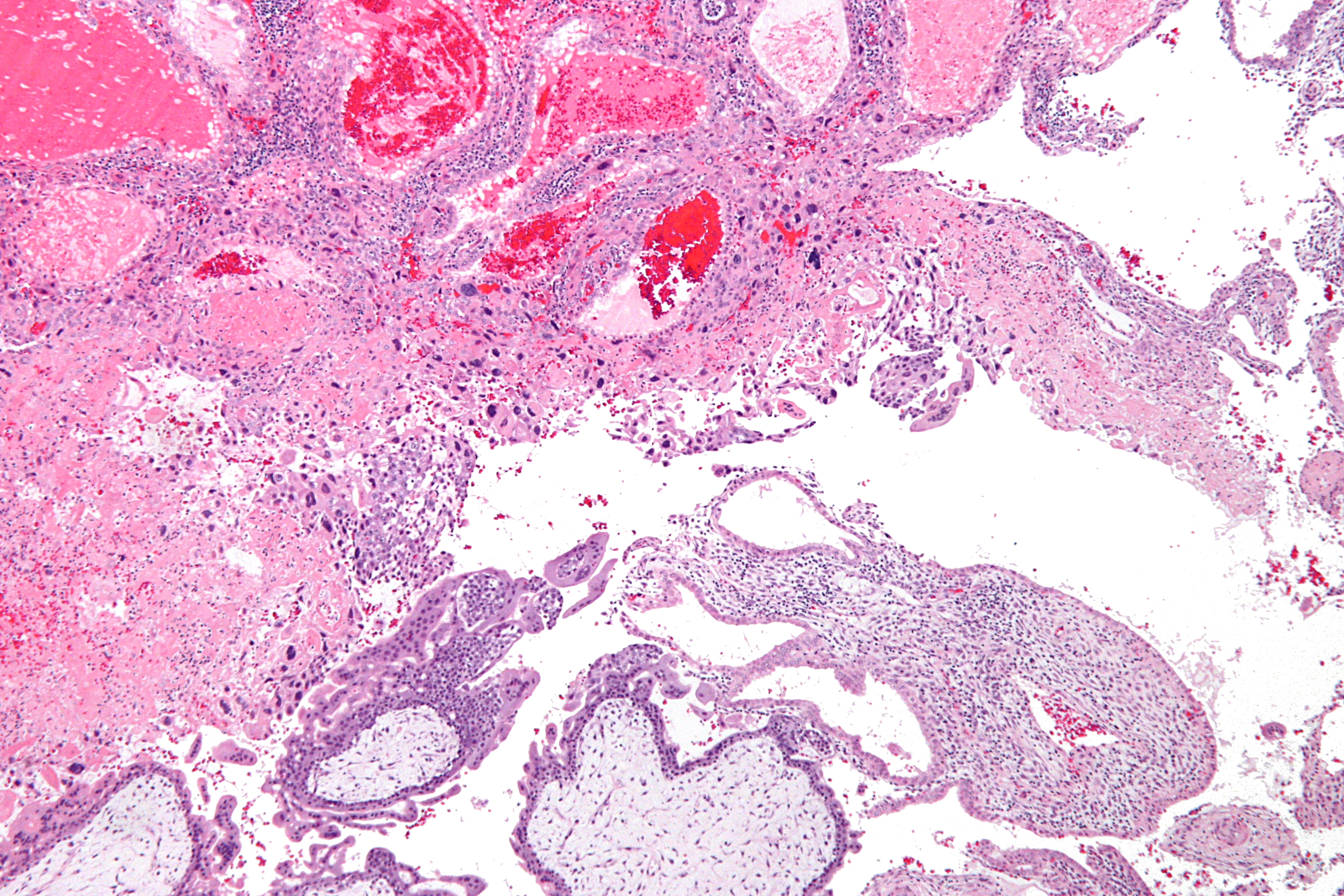
- Micrograph of intermediate trophoblast, decidua and a hydatidiform mole (bottom of image). H&E stain.
- Specialty: Oncology

Gestational trophoblastic disease (GTD) is a term used for a group of pregnancy-related tumours. These tumours are rare, and they appear when cells in the womb start to proliferate uncontrollably. The cells that form gestational trophoblastic tumours are called trophoblasts and come from tissue that grows to form the placenta during pregnancy.

There are several different types of GTD. A hydatidiform mole also known as a molar pregnancy, is the most common and is usually benign. Sometimes it may develop into an invasive mole, or, more rarely into a choriocarcinoma. A choriocarcinoma is likely to spread quickly, but is very sensitive to chemotherapy, and has a very good prognosis. Trophoblasts are of particular interest to cell biologists because, like cancer, they can invade tissue (the uterus).

GTD can simulate pregnancy, because the uterus may contain fetal tissue, albeit abnormal. This tissue may grow at the same rate as a normal pregnancy, and produces chorionic gonadotropin, a hormone which is measured to monitor fetal well-being.

While GTD overwhelmingly affects women of child-bearing age, it may rarely occur in postmenopausal women.

== Types ==
GTD is the common name for five closely related tumours (one benign tumour, and four malignant tumours). All five closely related tumours develop in the placenta. All five tumours arise from trophoblast cells that form the outer layer of the blastocyst in the early development of the fetus. In a normal pregnancy, trophoblasts aid the implantation of the fertilised egg into the uterine wall. However, in GTD, they develop into tumour cells.

=== Benign tumour ===
The benign form of GTD is a hydatidiform mole. Here, a fertilised egg implants into the uterus, but some cells around the fetus (the chorionic villi) do not develop properly. The pregnancy is not viable, and the normal pregnancy process turns into a benign tumour. There are two subtypes of hydatidiform mole: complete hydatidiform mole, and partial hydatidiform mole.

=== Malignant tumours ===
- Invasive mole
- Choriocarcinoma
- Placental site trophoblastic tumour
- Epithelioid trophoblastic tumour

== Cause ==
Two main risk factors increase the likelihood for the development of GTD: 1) The woman being under 20 years of age, or over 35 years of age, and 2) previous GTD. Although molar pregnancies affect women of all ages, women under 16 and over 45 years of age have an increased risk of developing a molar pregnancy.

Hydatidiform moles are abnormal conceptions with excessive placental development. Conception takes place, but placental tissue grows very fast, rather than supporting the growth of a fetus.

Complete hydatidiform moles have no fetal tissue and no maternal DNA, as a result of a maternal ovum with no functional DNA. Most commonly, a single spermatozoon duplicates and fertilises an empty ovum. Less commonly, two separate spermatozoa fertilise an empty ovum (dispermic fertilisation). Partial hydatidiform moles have a fetus or fetal cells. They are triploid in origin, containing one set of maternal haploid genes and two sets of paternal haploid genes. They almost always occur following dispermic fertilisation of a normal ovum. Malignant forms of GTD are very rare. About 50% of malignant forms of GTD develop from a hydatidiform mole.

== Diagnosis ==
Cases of GTD can be diagnosed through routine tests given during pregnancy, such as blood tests and ultrasound, or through tests done after miscarriage or abortion. Vaginal bleeding, enlarged uterus, pelvic pain or discomfort, and vomiting too much (hyperemesis) are the most common symptoms of GTD. But GTD also leads to elevated serum hCG (human chorionic gonadotropin hormone). Since pregnancy is by far the most common cause of elevated serum hCG, clinicians generally first suspect a pregnancy with a complication. However, in GTD, the beta subunit of hCG (beta hCG) is also always elevated. Therefore, if GTD is clinically suspected, serum beta hCG is also measured.

The initial clinical diagnosis of GTD should be confirmed histologically, which can be done after the evacuation of pregnancy (see Treatment below) in women with hydatidiform mole. However, malignant GTD is highly vascular. If malignant GTD is suspected clinically, biopsy is contraindicated, because biopsy may cause life-threatening haemorrhage.

Women with persistent abnormal vaginal bleeding after any pregnancy, and women developing acute respiratory or neurological symptoms after any pregnancy, should also undergo hCG testing, because these may be signs of a hitherto undiagnosed GTD.

There might be some signs and symptoms of hyperthyroidism as well as an increase in the levels of thyroid hormones in some patients. The proposed mechanism is attaching hCG to TSH receptors and acting like TSH weakly.

=== Differential diagnosis ===
- These are not GTD, and they are not tumours
  - Exaggerated placental site
  - Placental site nodule

Both are composed of intermediate trophoblast, but their morphological features and clinical presentation can differ significantly.

Exaggerated placental site is a benign, non cancerous lesion with an increased number of implantation site intermediate trophoblastic cells that infiltrate the endometrium and the underlying myometrium. An exaggerated placental site may occur with normal pregnancy, or after an abortion. No specific treatment or follow up is necessary.

Placental site nodules are lesions of chorionic type intermediate trophoblast, usually small. 40–50% of placental site nodules are found in the cervix. They almost always are incidental findings after a surgical procedure. No specific treatment or follow up is necessary.

== Treatment ==
Treatment is always necessary.

The treatment for hydatidiform mole consists of the evacuation of pregnancy. Evacuation will lead to the relief of symptoms, and also prevent later complications. Suction curettage is the preferred method of evacuation. Hysterectomy is an alternative if no further pregnancies are wished for by the female patient. Hydatidiform mole also has successfully been treated with systemic (intravenous) methotrexate.

The treatment for invasive mole or choriocarcinoma generally is the same. Both are usually treated with chemotherapy. Methotrexate and dactinomycin are among the chemotherapy drugs used in GTD. In women with low risk gestational trophoblastic neoplasia, a review has found that Actinomycin D is probably more effective as a treatment and more likely to achieve a cure in the first instance than methotrexate. Only a few women with GTD have poor prognosis metastatic gestational trophoblastic disease. Their treatment usually includes chemotherapy. Radiotherapy can also be given to places where the cancer has spread, e.g. the brain.

Women who undergo chemotherapy are advised not to conceive for one year after completion of treatment. These women also are likely to have an earlier menopause. It has been estimated by the Royal College of Obstetricians and Gynaecologists that the age at menopause for women who receive single agent chemotherapy is advanced by one year, and by three years for women who receive multi agent chemotherapy.

=== Follow up ===
Follow up is necessary in all women with gestational trophoblastic disease, because of the possibility of persistent disease, or because of the risk of developing malignant uterine invasion or malignant metastatic disease even after treatment in some women with certain risk factors.

The use of a reliable contraception method is very important during the entire follow up period, as patients are strongly advised against pregnancy at that time. If a reliable contraception method is not used during the follow-up, it could be initially unclear to clinicians as to whether a rising hCG level is caused by the patient becoming pregnant again, or by the continued presence of GTD.

In women who have a malignant form of GTD, hCG concentrations stay the same (plateau) or they rise. Persistent elevation of serum hCG levels after a non molar pregnancy (i.e., normal pregnancy [term pregnancy], or preterm pregnancy, or ectopic pregnancy [pregnancy taking place in the wrong place, usually in the fallopian tube], or abortion) always indicate persistent GTD (very frequently due to choriocarcinoma or placental site trophoblastic tumour), but this is not common, because treatment mostly is successful.

In rare cases, a previous GTD may be reactivated after a subsequent pregnancy, even after several years. Therefore, the hCG tests should be performed also after any subsequent pregnancy in all women who had had a previous GTD (6 and 10 weeks after the end of any subsequent pregnancy).

== Prognosis ==
Women with a hydatidiform mole have an excellent prognosis. Women with a malignant form of GTD usually have a very good prognosis.

Choriocarcinoma, for example, is an uncommon, yet almost always curable cancer. Although choriocarcinoma is a highly malignant tumour and a life-threatening disease, it is very sensitive to chemotherapy. Virtually all women with non-metastatic disease are cured and retain their fertility; the prognosis is also very good for those with metastatic (spreading) cancer, in the early stages, but fertility may be lost. Hysterectomy (surgical removal of the uterus) can also be offered to patients > 40 years of age or those for whom sterilisation is not an obstacle. Only a few women with GTD have a poor prognosis, e.g. some forms of stage IV GTN. The FIGO staging system is used. The risk can be estimated by scoring systems such as the Modified WHO Prognostic Scoring System, wherein scores between 1 and 4 from various parameters are summed together:

Modified WHO Prognostic Scoring System
	0	1	2	4
Age	<40	≥40	–	–
Antecedent pregnancy	mole	abortion	term	–
Interval months from index pregnancy	<4	4–6	7–12	>12
Pretreatment serum hCG (IU/L)	<10^{3}	10^{3}–10^{4}	10^{4}–10^{5}	>10^{5}
Largest tumor size (including uterus)	<3	3–4 cm	≥5 cm	–
Site of metastases	lung	spleen, kidney	gastrointestinal	liver, brain
Number of metastases	–	1–4	5–8	>8
Previous failed chemotherapy	–	–	single drug	≥2 drugs

In this scoring system, women with a score of 7 or greater are considered at high risk.

It is very important for malignant forms of GTD to be discovered in time. In Western countries, women with molar pregnancies are followed carefully; for instance, in the UK, all women who have had a molar pregnancy are registered at the National Trophoblastic Screening Centre. There are efforts in this direction in the developing countries too, and there have been improvements in these countries in the early detection of choriocarcinoma, thereby significantly reducing the mortality rate also in developing countries.

=== Becoming pregnant again ===
Most women with GTD can become pregnant again and can have children again. The risk of a further molar pregnancy is low. More than 98% of women who become pregnant following a molar pregnancy will not have a further hydatidiform mole or be at increased risk of complications.

In the past, it was seen as important not to get pregnant straight away after a GTD. Specialists recommended a waiting period of six months after the hCG levels become normal. Recently, this standpoint has been questioned. New medical data suggest that a significantly shorter waiting period after the hCG levels become normal is reasonable for approximately 97% of the patients with hydatidiform mole.

=== Risk of a repeat GTD ===
The risk of a repeat GTD is approximately 1 in 100, compared with approximately 1 in 1000 risk in the general population. Especially women whose hCG levels remain significantly elevated are at risk of developing a repeat GTD.

=== Persistent trophoblastic disease ===
The term «persistent trophoblastic disease» (PTD) is used when after treatment of a molar pregnancy, some molar tissue is left behind and again starts growing into a tumour. Although PTD can spread within the body like a malignant cancer, the overall cure rate is nearly 100%.

In the vast majority of patients, treatment of PTD consist of chemotherapy. Only about 10% of patients with PTD can be treated successfully with a second curettage.

=== GTD coexisting with a normal fetus, also called "twin pregnancy" ===
In some very rare cases, a GTD can coexist with a normal fetus. This is called a "twin pregnancy". These cases should be managed only by experienced clinics, after extensive consultation with the patient. Because successful term delivery might be possible, the pregnancy should be allowed to proceed if the mother wishes, following appropriate counselling. The probability of achieving a healthy baby is approximately 40%, but there is a risk of complications, e.g. pulmonary embolism and pre-eclampsia. Compared with women who simply had a GTD in the past, there is no increased risk of developing persistent GTD after such a twin pregnancy.

In few cases, a GTD had coexisted with a normal pregnancy, but this was discovered only incidentally after a normal birth.

== Epidemiology ==
Overall, GTD is a rare disease. Nevertheless, the incidence of GTD varies greatly between different parts of the world. The reported incidence of hydatidiform mole ranges from 23 to 1299 cases per 100,000 pregnancies. The incidence of the malignant forms of GTD is much lower, only about 10% of the incidence of hydatidiform mole. The reported incidence of GTD from Europe and North America is significantly lower than the reported incidence of GTD from Asia and South America. One proposed reason for this great geographical variation is differences in healthy diet in the different parts of the world (e.g., carotene deficiency).

However, the incidence of rare diseases (such as GTD) is difficult to measure, because epidemiologic data on rare diseases is limited. Not all cases will be reported, and some cases will not be recognised. In addition, in GTD, this is especially difficult, because one would need to know all gestational events in the total population. Yet, it seems very likely that the estimated number of births that occur at home or outside of a hospital has been inflated in some reports.

== Terminology ==
Gestational trophoblastic disease (GTD) may also be called gestational trophoblastic tumour (GTT). Hydatidiform mole (one type of GTD) may also be called molar pregnancy.

Persistent disease; persistent GTD: If there is any evidence of persistence of GTD, usually defined as persistent elevation of beta hCG (see Diagnosis above), the condition may also be referred to as gestational trophoblastic neoplasia (GTN).

== See also ==
- Trophoblastic neoplasms
