= PSN (disambiguation) =

PSN is the PlayStation Network, an online service for Sony PlayStation game consoles.

PSN may also refer to:

== Businesses and organisations ==
- Party of the Nationalist Society (Partido de la Sociedad Nacionalista), a political party in Mexico
- National Solidarity Party (Guatemala) (Partido Solidaridad Nacional)
- Project Safe Neighborhoods, US DoJ initiative against gun violence
- PT Pasifik Satelit Nusantara (PSN), an Indonesian private telecommunications company

== Science and technology ==
- Patient similarity network, a mathematical model
- Placental site nodule, a benign remnant of a previous pregnancy
- Processor Serial Number, unique to each Intel Pentium III microprocessor
- Public Services Network, unified UK government network
- Picosthène (psn), 10^{−12} sthène, an obsolete unit of force or thrust

== Other uses ==
- Palm Springs station, California, United States, Amtrak station code PSN
- Parson Street railway station, Bedminster, England, station code PSN
- Prime Sports Network, a defunct group of regional sports networks
- PSN Ngada, an Indonesian football club
- PSN Nunukan, an Indonesian football club
