= Adaptive type =

Adaptive type – in evolutionary biology – is any population or taxon which have the potential for a particular or total occupation of given free of underutilized home habitats or position in the general economy of nature. In evolutionary sense, the emergence of new adaptive type is usually a result of adaptive radiation certain groups of organisms in which they arise categories that can effectively exploit temporary, or new conditions of the environment.

Such evolutive units with their distinctive – morphological and anatomical, physiological and other characteristics, i.e. genetic and adjustments (feature) have a predisposition for an occupation certain home habitats or position in the general nature economy.

Simply, the adaptive type is one group organisms whose general biological properties represent a key to open the entrance to the observed adaptive zone in the observed natural ecological complex.

Adaptive types are spatially and temporally specific. Since the frames of general biological properties these types of substantially genetic are defined between, in effect the emergence of new adaptive types of the corresponding change in population genetic structure and eternal contradiction between the need for optimal adapted well the conditions of living environment, while maintaining genetic variation for survival in a possible new circumstances.

For example, the specific place in the economy of nature existed millions of years before the appearance of human type. However, just when the process of evolution of primates (order Primates) reached a level that is able to occupy that position, it is open, and then (in leaving world) an unprecedented acceleration increasingly spreading. Culture, in the broadest sense, is a key adaptation of adaptive type type of Homo sapiens the occupation of existing adaptive zone through work, also in the broadest sense of the term.

== See also ==
- Adaptive zone
- Adaptation
- Progressive evolution
- Speciation
