= Molar pregnancy =

Abnormal form of pregnancy (human disorder)

- Other names: Hydatid mole, hydatidiform mole
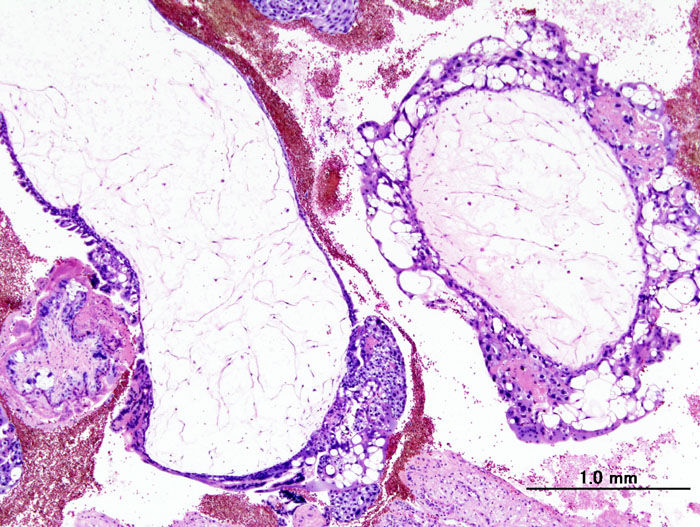
- Histopathologic image of hydatidiform mole (complete type). H&E stain.
- Specialty: Obstetrics

A molar pregnancy, also known as a hydatidiform mole, is an abnormal form of pregnancy in which a non-viable fertilized egg implants in the uterus. It falls under the category of gestational trophoblastic diseases.

During a molar pregnancy, the uterus contains a growing mass characterized by swollen chorionic villi, resembling clusters of grapes. The occurrence of a molar pregnancy can be attributed to the fertilized egg lacking an original maternal nucleus. As a result, the products of conception may or may not contain fetal tissue. These molar pregnancies are categorized into two types: partial moles and complete moles, where the term 'mole' simply denotes a clump of growing tissue or a 'growth'.

A complete mole is caused by either a single sperm (90% of the time) or two sperm (10% of the time) combining with an egg that has lost its DNA. In the former case, the sperm reduplicates, leading to the formation of a "complete" 46-chromosome set. Typically, the genotype is 46, XX (diploid) due to subsequent mitosis of the fertilizing sperm, but it can also be 46, XY (diploid). However, 46, YY (diploid) is not observed. On the other hand, a partial mole occurs when a normal egg is fertilized by one or two sperm, which then reduplicates itself, resulting in genotypes of 69, XXY (triploid) or 92, XXXY (tetraploid).

Complete moles carry a 2–4% risk, in Western countries, of developing into choriocarcinoma and a higher risk of 10–15% in Eastern countries, with an additional 15% risk of becoming an invasive mole. In contrast, incomplete moles can become invasive as well but are not associated with choriocarcinoma. Notably, complete hydatidiform moles account for 50% of all cases of choriocarcinoma.

Molar pregnancies are relatively rare complications of pregnancy, occurring in approximately 1 in 1,000 pregnancies in the United States, while in Asia, the rates are considerably higher, reaching up to 1 in 100 pregnancies in countries like Indonesia.

== Signs and symptoms ==
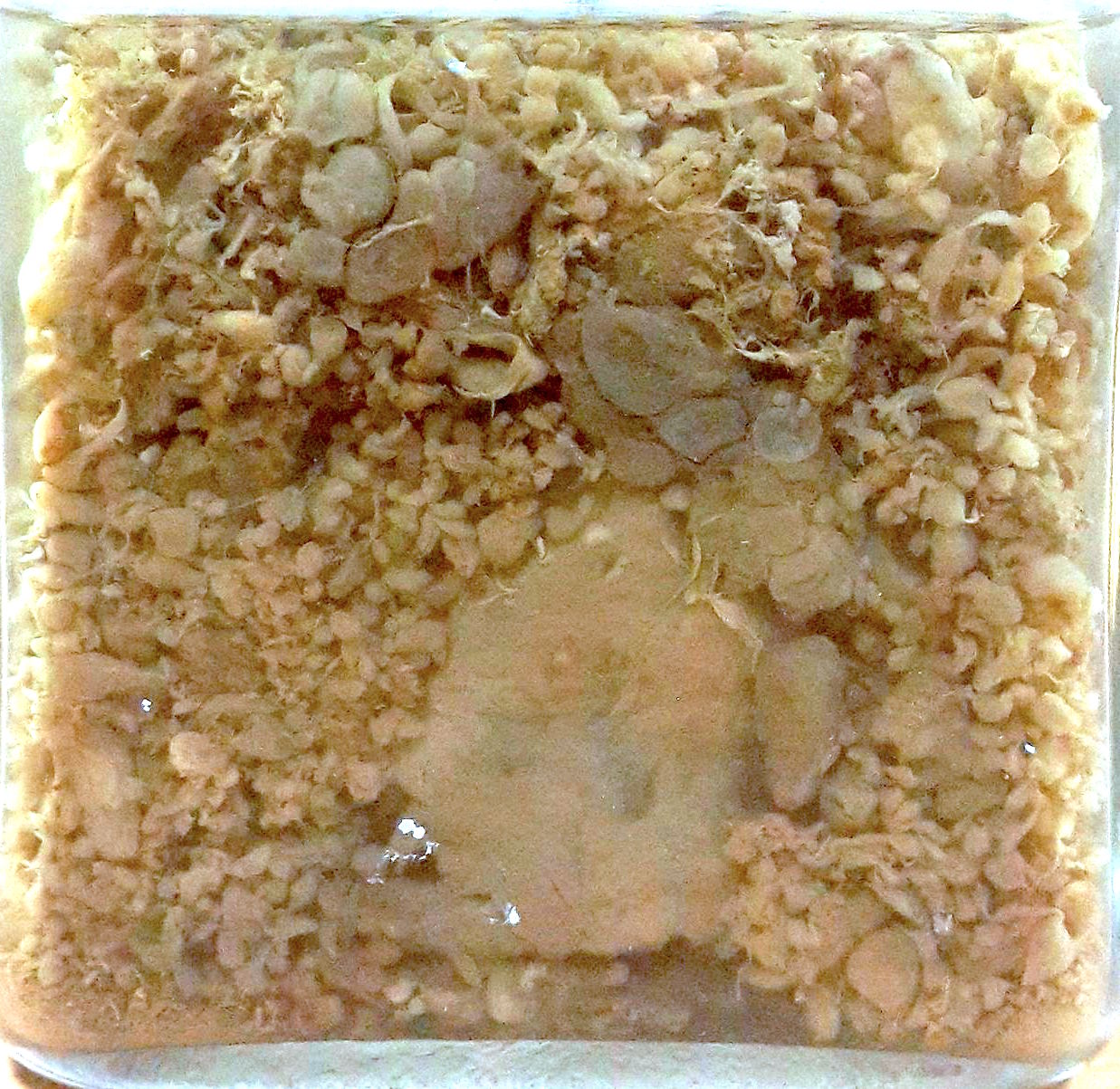
Vesicular mole

Molar pregnancies usually present with painless vaginal bleeding in the fourth to fifth months of pregnancy. The uterus may be larger than expected, or the ovaries may be enlarged. There may also be more vomiting than would be expected (hyperemesis). Sometimes there is an increase in blood pressure along with protein in the urine. Blood tests will show very high levels of human chorionic gonadotropin (hCG).

== Cause ==
The cause of this condition is not completely understood. Potential risk factors may include defects in the egg, abnormalities within the uterus, or nutritional deficiencies. Women under 20 or over 40 years of age have a higher risk. Other risk factors include diets low in protein, folic acid, and carotene. The diploid set of sperm-only DNA means that all chromosomes have sperm-patterned methylation suppression of genes. This leads to overgrowth of the syncytiotrophoblast whereas dual egg-patterned methylation leads to a devotion of resources to the embryo, with an underdeveloped syncytiotrophoblast. This is considered to be the result of evolutionary competition, with male genes driving for high investment into the fetus versus female genes driving for resource restriction to maximise the number of children.

== Pathophysiology ==
A hydatidiform mole is a pregnancy/conceptus in which the placenta contains grapelike vesicles (small sacs) that are usually visible to the naked eye. The vesicles arise by distention of the chorionic villi by fluid. When inspected under the microscope, hyperplasia of the trophoblastic tissue is noted. If left untreated, a hydatidiform mole will almost always end as a spontaneous abortion (miscarriage).

Based on morphology, hydatidiform moles can be divided into two types: in complete moles, all the chorionic villi are vesicular, and no sign of embryonic or fetal development is present. In partial moles, some villi are vesicular, whereas others appear more normal, and embryonic/fetal development may be seen, but the fetus is always malformed and is never viable.

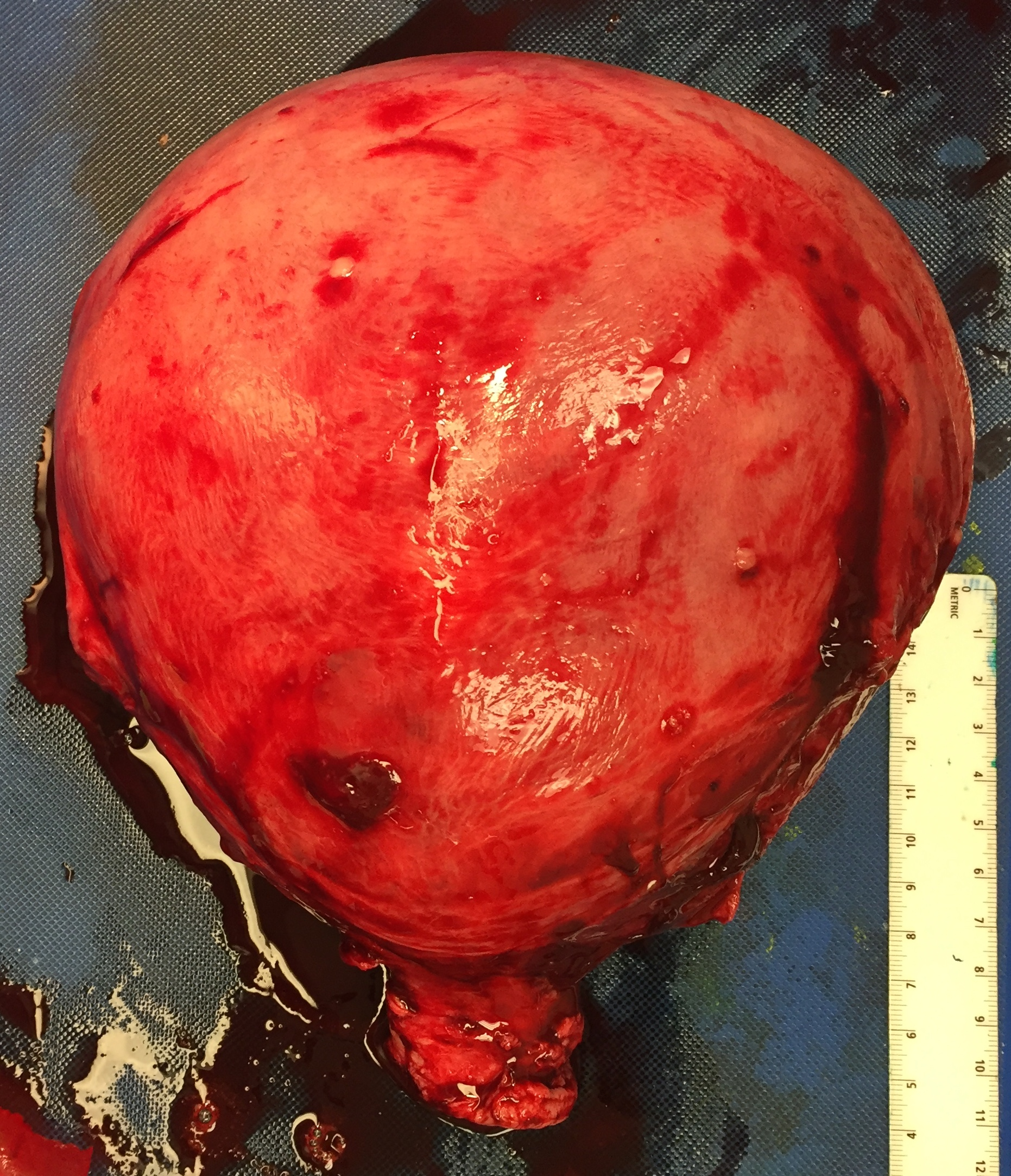
Uterus with complete hydatidiform mole

In rare cases, a hydatidiform mole co-exists in the uterus with a normal, viable fetus. These cases are due to twinning. The uterus contains the products of two conceptions: one with an abnormal placenta and no viable fetus (the mole), and one with a normal placenta and a viable fetus. Under careful surveillance, it is often possible for the woman to give birth to a normal child and to be cured of the mole.

=== Parental origin ===
In most complete moles, all nuclear genes are inherited from the father only (androgenesis). In approximately 80% of these androgenetic moles, the most probable mechanism is that an egg with an empty nucleus or no nucleus is fertilized by a single sperm, followed by a duplication of all chromosomes/genes (a process called endoreduplication). In approximately 20% of complete moles, the most probable mechanism is that an empty egg is fertilized by two sperm. In both cases, the moles are diploid (i.e., there are two copies of every chromosome). In all these cases, the mitochondrial genes are inherited from the mother, as usual.

Most partial moles are triploid (three chromosome sets). The nucleus contains one maternal set of genes and two paternal sets. The mechanism is usually the reduplication of the paternal haploid set from a single sperm, but may also be the consequence of dispermic (two sperm) fertilization of the egg.

In rare cases, hydatidiform moles are tetraploid (four chromosome sets) or have other chromosome abnormalities.

A small percentage of hydatidiform moles have biparental diploid genomes, as in normal living persons; they have two sets of chromosomes, one inherited from each biological parent. Some of these moles occur in women who carry mutations in the gene NLRP7, predisposing them towards molar pregnancy. These rare variants of hydatidiform mole may be complete or partial.

== Diagnosis ==
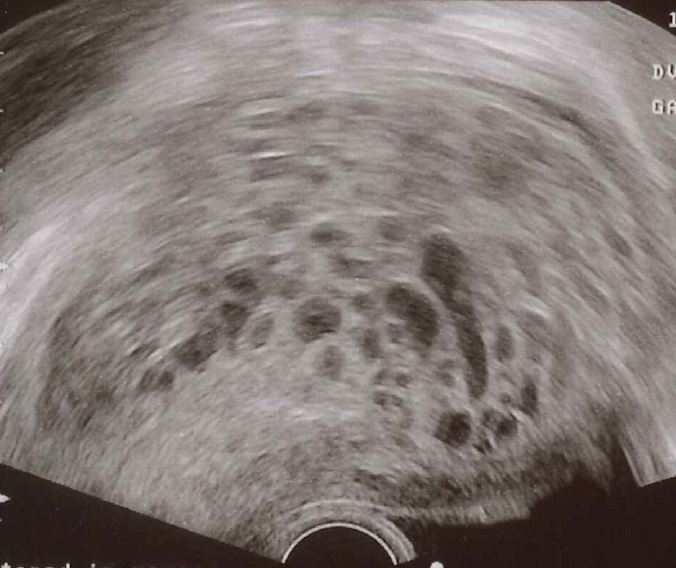
Transvaginal ultrasonography showing a molar pregnancy

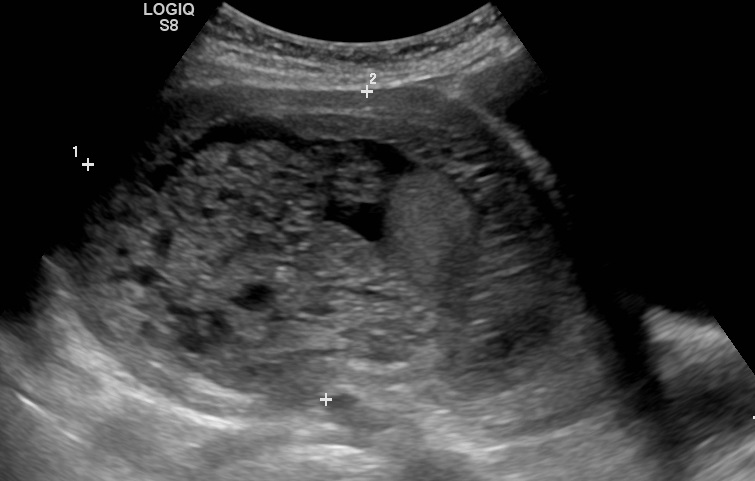
Molar pregnancy in ultrasound

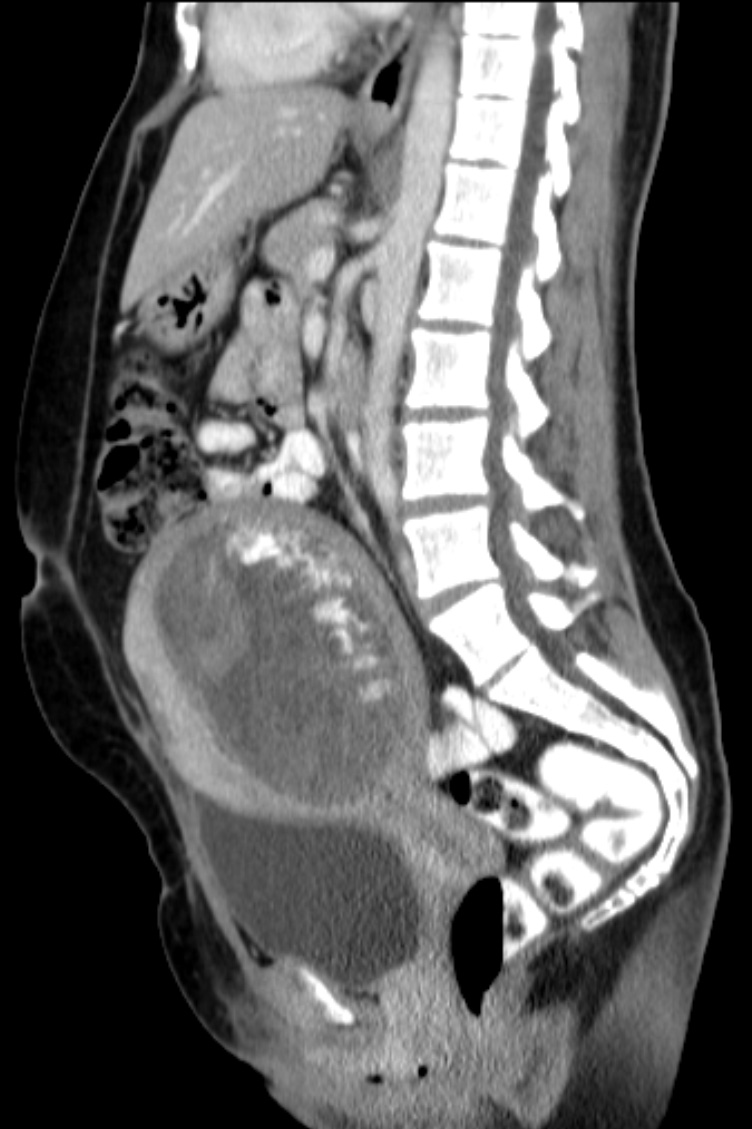
Hydatidiform mole on CT, sagittal view

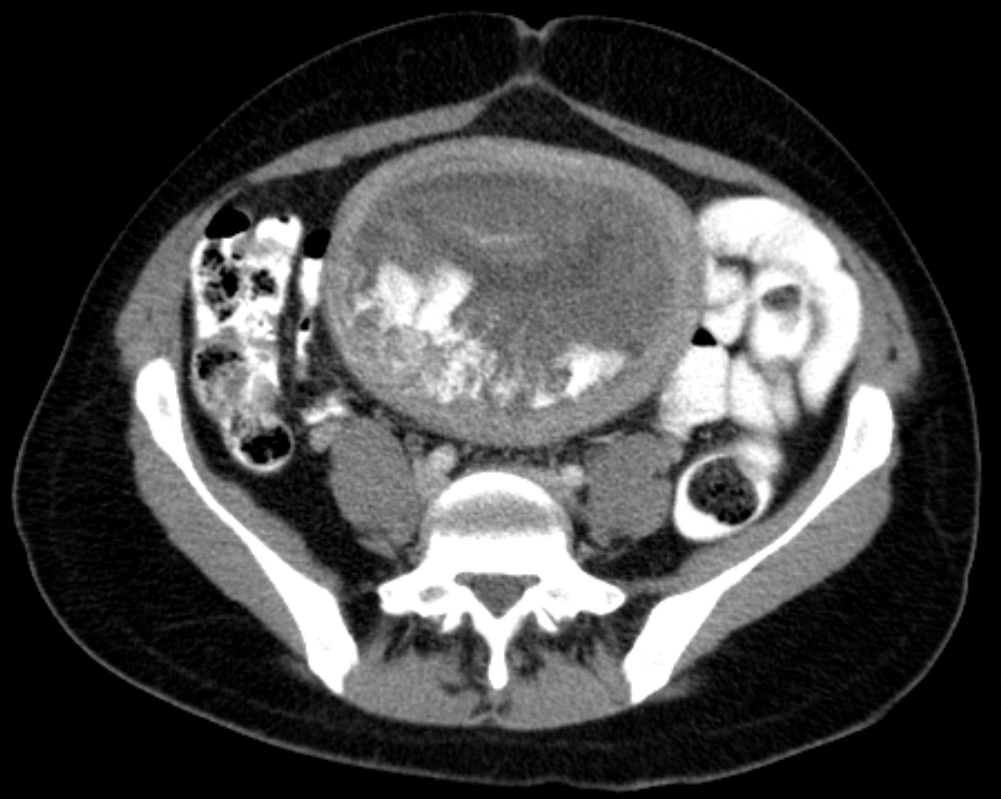
Hydatidiform mole on CT, axial view

The diagnosis is strongly suggested by ultrasound (sonogram), but definitive diagnosis requires histopathological examination. On ultrasound, the mole resembles a bunch of grapes ("cluster of grapes" or "honeycombed uterus" or "snow-storm"). There is increased trophoblast proliferation and enlarging of the chorionic villi, and angiogenesis in the trophoblasts is impaired.

Sometimes symptoms of hyperthyroidism are seen, due to the extremely high levels of hCG, which can mimic the effects of thyroid-stimulating hormone.

	Complete Mole	Partial Mole
Karyotype	46, XX or 46, XY	69, XXY or 69, XXX
hCG	↑↑↑↑	↑
Uterine Size	↑	–
Fetal Parts	No	Yes
Components	2 sperm + empty egg or Empty egg + 1 sperm that duplicates	2 sperm + 1 egg or 1 sperm + 1 egg that duplicates
Risk of Choriocarcinoma	15%	0.5%

== Treatment ==
Hydatidiform moles should be treated by evacuating the uterus by uterine suction or by surgical curettage as soon as possible after diagnosis, to avoid the risks of choriocarcinoma. Patients are followed up until their serum human chorionic gonadotrophin (hCG) level has fallen to an undetectable level. Invasive or metastatic moles (cancer) may require chemotherapy and often respond well to methotrexate. As they contain paternal antigens, the response to treatment is nearly 100%. Patients are advised not to conceive for half a year after hCG levels have normalized. The chances of having another molar pregnancy are approximately 1%.

Management is more complicated when the mole occurs together with one or more normal fetuses.

In some women, the growth can develop into gestational trophoblastic neoplasia. For women who have complete hydatidiform mole and are at high risk of this progression, evidence suggests that giving prophylactic chemotherapy (known as P-chem) may reduce the risk of this happening. However P-chem may also increase toxic side effects, so more research is needed to explore its effects.

=== Anesthesia ===
The uterine curettage is generally done under anesthesia, preferably spinal anesthesia in hemodynamically stable patients. The advantages of spinal anesthesia over general anesthesia include ease of technique, favorable effects on the pulmonary system, safety in patients with hyperthyroidism, and non-tocolytic pharmacological properties. Additionally, by maintaining the patient's consciousness, one can diagnose complications like uterine perforation, cardiopulmonary distress, and thyroid storm at an earlier stage than when the patient is sedated or is under general anesthesia.

== Prognosis ==
More than 80% of hydatidiform moles are benign. The outcome after treatment is usually excellent. Close follow-up is essential to ensure that treatment has been successful. Highly effective means of contraception are recommended to avoid pregnancy for at least 6 to 12 months. Women who have had a prior partial or complete mole have a slightly increased risk of a second hydatidiform mole in a subsequent pregnancy, meaning a future pregnancy will require an earlier ultrasound scan.

In 10 to 15% of cases, hydatidiform moles may develop into invasive moles. This condition is named persistent trophoblastic disease (PTD). The moles may intrude so far into the uterine wall that hemorrhage or other complications develop. It is for this reason that a post-operative full abdominal and chest X-ray will often be requested.

In 2 to 3% of cases, hydatidiform moles may develop into choriocarcinoma, which is a malignant, rapidly growing, and metastatic (spreading) form of cancer. Despite these factors, which normally indicate a poor prognosis, the rate of cure after treatment with chemotherapy is high.

Over 90% of women with malignant, non-spreading cancer can survive and retain their ability to conceive and bear children. In those with metastatic (spreading) cancer, remission remains at 75 to 85%, although their childbearing ability is usually lost.

== Etymology ==
The etymology is derived from hydatisia (Greek "a drop of water"), referring to the watery contents of the cysts, and mole (from Latin mola = millstone/false conception). The term, however, comes from the similar appearance of the cyst to a hydatid cyst in an echinococcosis.
