= Placental site trophoblastic tumor =

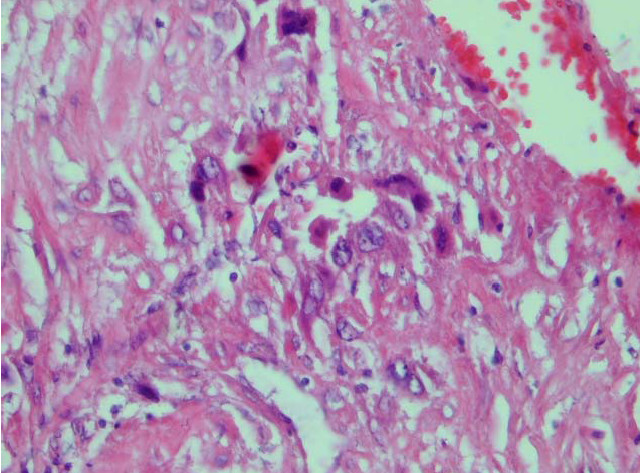
- Photomicrograph showing proliferating intermediate trophoblast with scarce cytotophoblastic and syncytiotrophoblastic elements
- Specialty: Oncology, obstetrics

A placental site trophoblastic tumor is a form of gestational trophoblastic disease, which is thought to arise from the intermediate trophoblast.

The tumor may secrete human placental lactogen, and result in a false-positive pregnancy test.

A placental site trophoblastic tumor is a monophasic neoplasm of the implantation site intermediate trophoblast, and usually a benign lesion, which comprises less than 2% of all gestational trophoblastic proliferations. Preceding conditions include molar pregnancy (5%). Compared to choriocarcinoma or invasive mole, hemorrhage is less conspicuous and serum β-HCG level is low, making early diagnosis difficult.

== Diagnosis ==
Immunohistochemistry often shows positive staining for hPL, keratin, Mel-CAM, and EGFR., This immunohistochemical profile, particularly the strong positivity for hPL and Mel-CAM, along with the negative or focal staining for β-hCG and p63, helps distinguish PSTT from other types of gestational trophoblastic neoplasia such as choriocarcinoma and epithelioid trophoblastic tumour.

== Treatment ==
If the causative pregnancy occurred less than 48 months prior to the tumor's diagnosis, the tumor can be removed via a hysterectomy without the need for adjunct systemic therapy. However, if more than 48 months have passed, or if the tumor is of stage II or higher, adjunct systemic therapy should be offered in the form of aggressive platinum-based chemotherapy. When possible, residual masses should be removed following treatment to insure against recurrence.

== Prognosis ==
10–20% of cases metastasize leading to death.
