= Intermediate trophoblast =

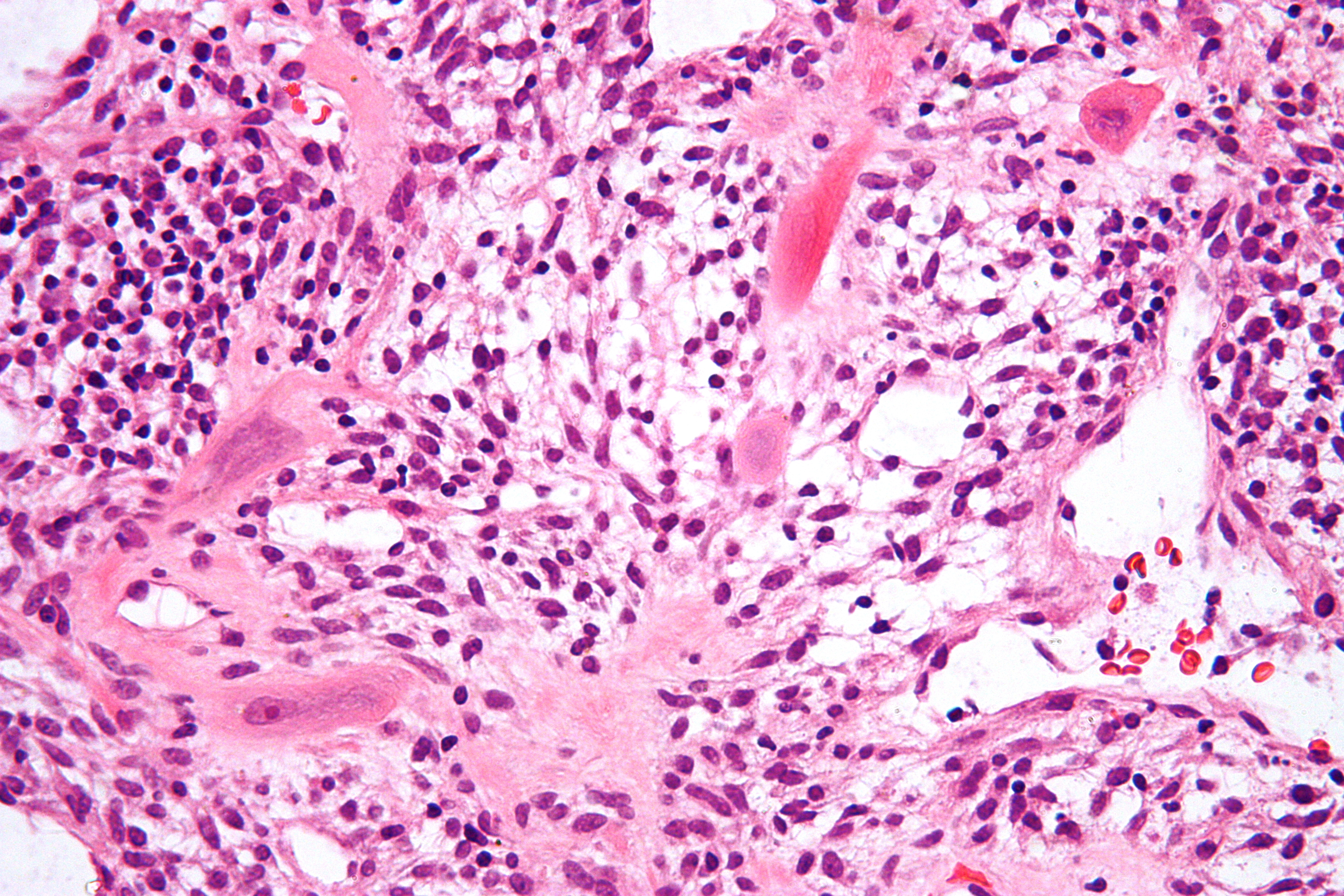
Micrograph showing intermediate trophoblasts. H&E stain.

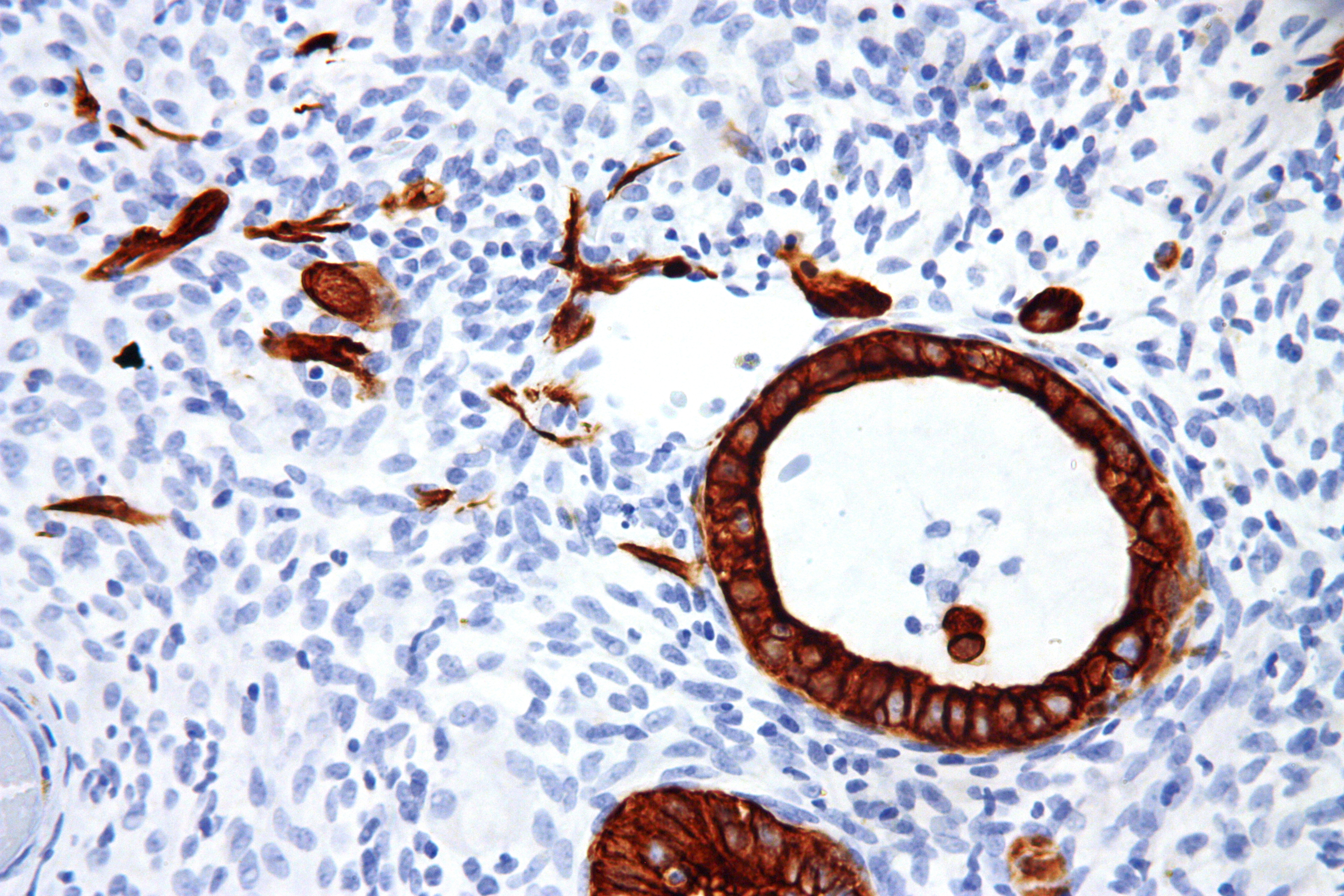
Implantation site intermediate trophoblast. Low molecular weight cytokeratin stain.

Intermediate trophoblast is a distinct subtype of trophoblastic tissue that arises from the cytotrophoblast.

It is sub-categorized by location:

- Villous intermediate trophoblast:
  - at anchoring villi of trophoblastic column
- Implantation site intermediate trophoblast:
  - at implantation site (or basal plate), differentiated from villous intermediate trophoblast
- Chorionic-type intermediate trophoblast
  - at chorionic laeve of fetal membrane, differentiated from villous intermediate trophoblast

== Function ==
The function of the implantation site intermediate trophoblast is to anchor the placenta to the maternal tissue.

== Histomorphology ==
- Villous intermediate trophoblast
  - polyhedral and uniform nuclei
  - prominent cell border; abundant eosinophilic to clear cytoplasm
  - cohesive growth
- Implantation site intermediate trophoblast
  - pleomorphic irregular nuclei, large and hyperchromatic, may show multinucleation
  - abundant eosinophilic to amphophilic cytoplasm
  - infiltrative growth (splitting muscle, replacing vascular wall ...etc)
- Chorionic-type intermediate trophoblast
  - round to polyhedral nuclei, may multinucleation
  - abundant eosinophilic to clear cytoplasm
  - cohesive growth

== Pathology ==
Intermediate trophoblasts are thought to be the cell of origin for:

- Exaggerated placental site (EPS): implantation site IT
- Placental site nodule (PSN): chorionic-type IT
- Placental site trophoblastic tumour (PSTT): implantation site IT
- Epithelioid trophoblastic tumour (ETT): chorionic-type IT
