= Placental site nodule =

Human disease

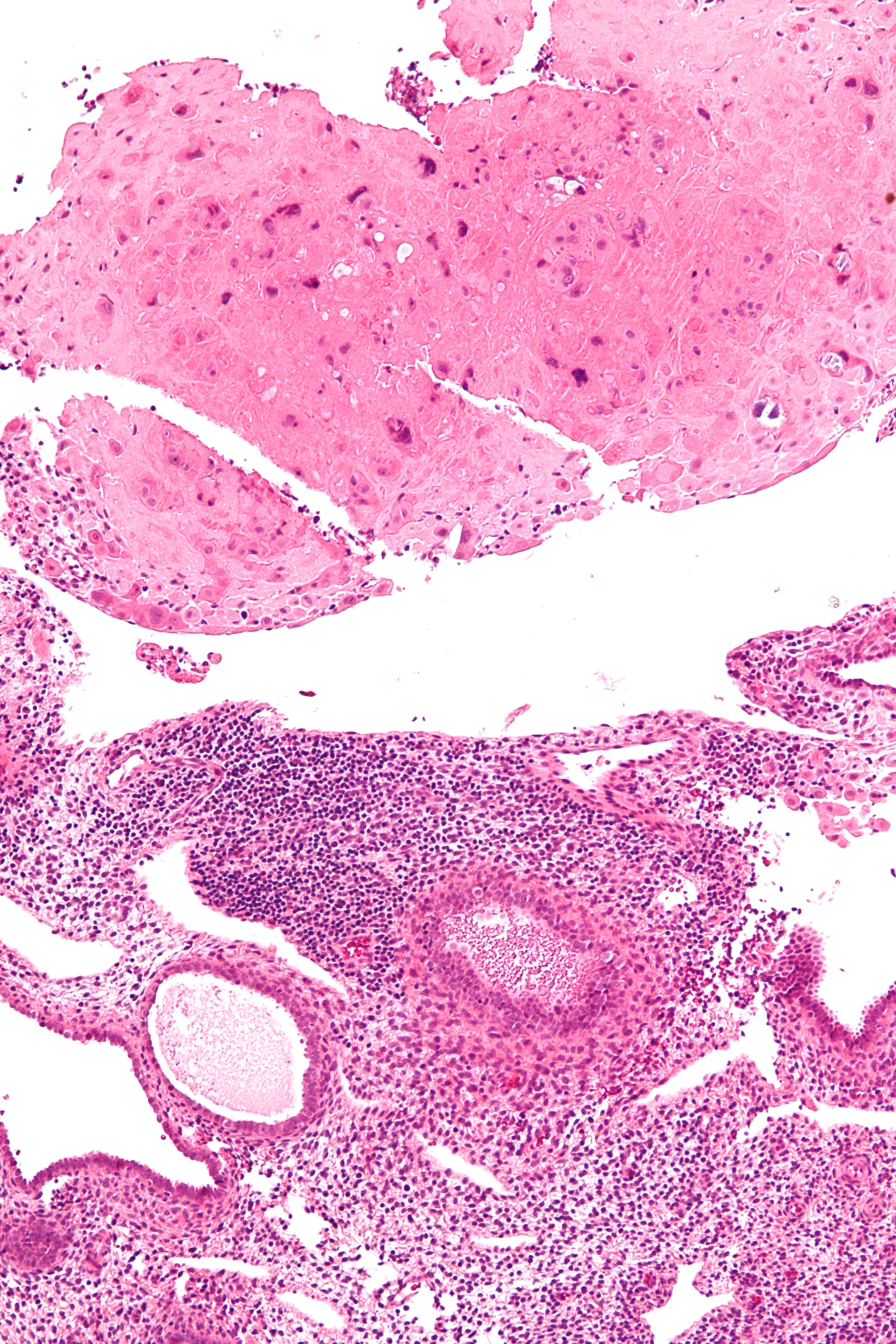
- Micrograph of a placental site nodule (top of image). H&E stain.

A placental site nodule (PSN) is benign remnant from a previous pregnancy.

== Presentation ==
They are typically asymptomatic and found incidentally.

== Pathology ==
PSNs are intermediate trophoblastic remnants.

== Diagnosis ==
PSNs are diagnosed by examining the tissue under a microscope, usually obtained with a dilation and curettage.

Typically, they consist of pink (hyaline) material using the standard stain and contain few cells. Bizarre multinucleated cells may be present; however, there is no mitotic activity. The differential diagnosis includes (cervical) squamous cell carcinoma, gestational trophoblastic disease, and exaggerated placental site.

== Prognosis ==
PSN are benign. Once removed, they do not require any treatment and do not recur.

== See also ==
- Gestational trophoblastic disease
- Placental site trophoblastic tumour
