= Invasive hydatidiform mole =

- Other names: Invasive mole, chorioadenoma (destruens), invasive gestational trophoblastic disease
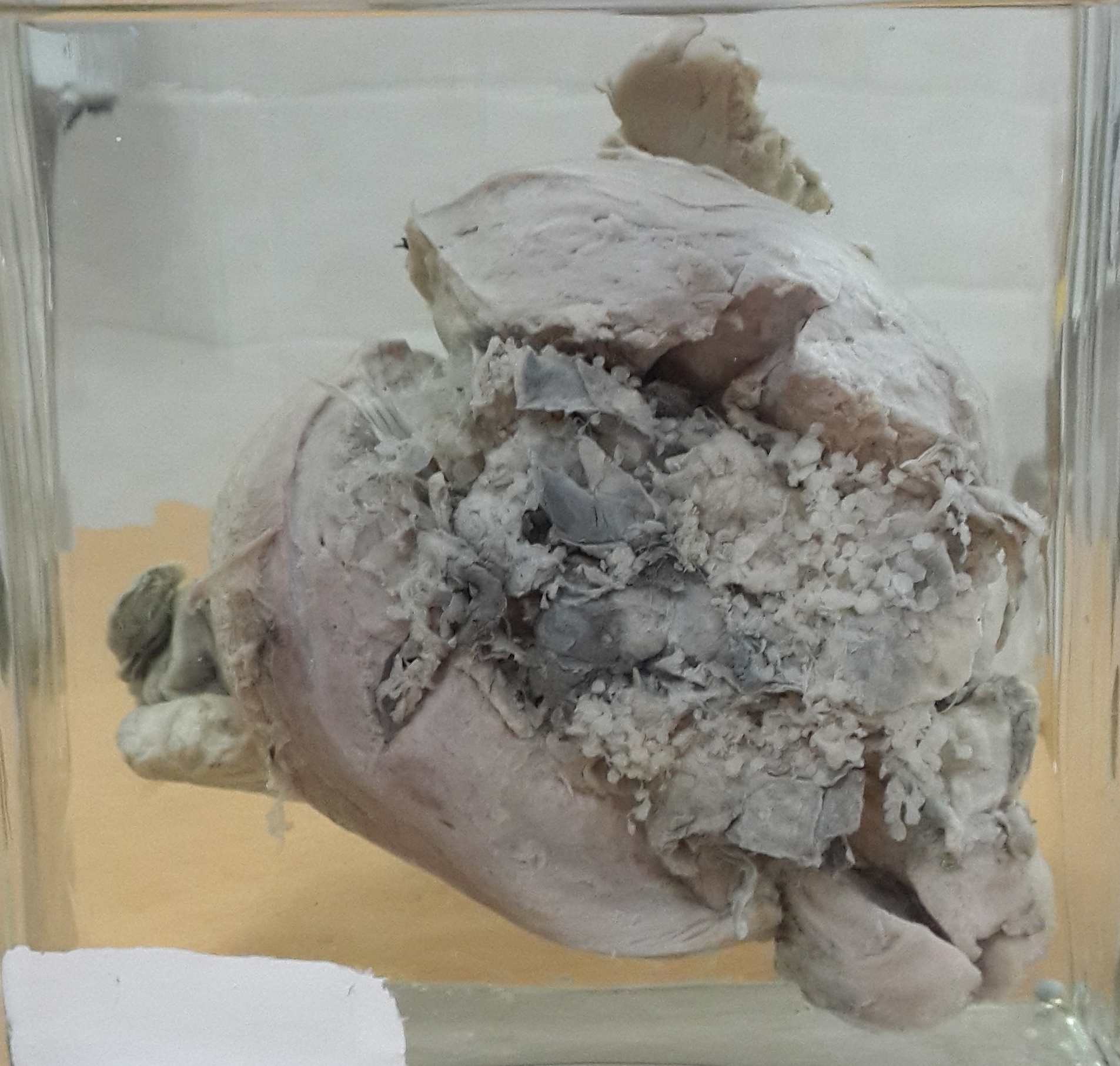
- Invasive hydatidiform mole
- Specialty: Oncology

Invasive hydatidiform mole, or more often invasive mole, is a type of neoplasia that grows into the muscular wall of the uterus. It is formed after conception (fertilization of an egg by a sperm). It may spread to other parts of the body, such as the vagina, vulva, and lung.

== See also ==
- Hydatidiform mole
