= Epithelioid trophoblastic tumour =

- Specialty: Oncology

Epithelioid trophoblastic tumor (ETT) is a gestational trophoblastic disease with about 110 case reports in the literature. It is a trophoblastic tumor of neoplastic chorionic type associated with the intermediate trophoblast.

== Signs and symptoms ==
- Vaginal bleeding: The most common presenting symptom is vaginal bleeding, which is associated with mild elevation of serum β hCG (< 2,500 IU/L)
- Amenorrhea.

== Morphology ==
=== Gross appearance ===
- There is deep infiltration of the surrounding structures by cystic hemorrhagic masses or discrete nodules.
- Necrosis is present with white to tan-brown cut surface with hemorrhage.
- Ulceration (common finding)
- Fistula (common finding)

=== Microscopic appearance ===
- Nodular, well circumscribed, focal infiltrative at the periphery.
- Uniform, mononucleate tumor cells are arranged in nests and cords.
- Tumor nests are associated with eosinophilic, fibrillar, hyaline-like material.
- Extensive necrosis with irregular contours.
- Calcification (common finding)
- Metaplastic endocervical or endometrial surface epithelium into squamous-like epithelium.

=== Locations ===
Common locations are:

- Uterus
  - Lower uterine segment (40%)
  - Cervix (31% of cases)
- Lungs (19% of cases)

They may rarely develop in

- Vagina
- Broad ligament
- Fallopian tubes
- Other pelvic organs

== Treatment ==
Epithelioid trophoblastic tumors (ETTs) are resistant to chemotherapy, but an immunotherapy drug called dostarlimab treats gestational trophoblastic neoplasia. ETT is a form of GTN. Stage I disease is treated with hysterectomy, while metastatic disease is treated with surgery and chemotherapy.

== Prognosis ==
Metastasis occur in 25% of cases and 10% die of the disease. Mitotic count of > 6/10HPF is an unfavorable prognostic factor.
