= Feature =

Feature may refer to:

== Computing ==
- Feature recognition, could be a hole, pocket, or notch
- Feature (computer vision), could be an edge, corner or blob
- Feature (machine learning), in statistics: individual measurable properties of the phenomena being observed
- Software feature, a distinguishing characteristic of a software program

== Science and analysis ==
- Feature data, in geographic information systems, comprise information about an entity with a geographic location
- Features, in audio signal processing, an aim to capture specific aspects of audio signals in a numeric way
- Feature (archaeology), any dug, built, or dumped evidence of human activity
- Geographical feature

== Media ==
- Feature film, a film with a running time long enough to be considered the principal or sole film to fill a program
  - Feature length, the standardized length of such films
- Feature article, a piece of non-fiction writing about news
- Radio documentary (feature), a radio program devoted to covering a particular topic in some depth, usually with a mixture of commentary and sound pictures
- A feature as a guest appearance

== Music ==
- Feature (band), a British punk trio.
- The Features, an American rock band

== Linguistics ==
- Feature (linguistics), a property of a class of linguistic items which describes individual members of that class
- Distinctive feature, the most basic unit of structure that can be analyzed by phonetics and phonology

== Other uses ==
- The Feature, a film collaboration between filmmakers Michel Auder and Andrew Neel
- The Feature (originally named Give Me Something to Read), a standalone website that features a few high-quality, long-form, nonfiction articles every day from Instapaper's most frequently saved articles

== See also ==
- Featurette
