= Chorionic gonadotropin beta =

Protein found in humans

CGB3
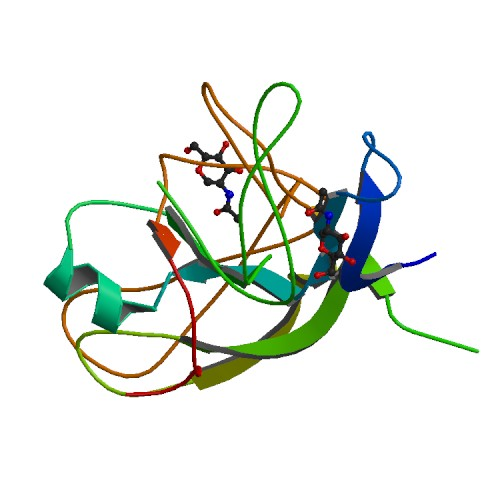

Identifiers
- Aliases: CGB3, CGB5, CGB7, CGB8, hCGB, CGB, Chorionic gonadotropin beta, chorionic gonadotropin beta subunit 3, Choriogonadotropin subunit beta, chorionic gonadotropin subunit beta 3, LHB, β-hCG
- External IDs: GeneCards: CGB3
Available structures
PDB	Human UniProt search: PDBe RCSB
PDB	List of PDB id codes 1HCN, 1HRP, 1QFW,%%s1QFW, 1HCN, 1HRP

Gene location (Human)
Chr.	Chromosome 19 (human)
Band	19q13.33	Start	49,022,869 bp
Band	19q13.33	End	49,024,333 bp
RNA expression pattern
Bgee	Human / Mouse (ortholog); Top expressed in: placenta; testicle; pituitary gland; anterior pituitary; body of pancreas; duodenum; olfactory zone of nasal mucosa; granulocyte; right testis; left testis / n/a; More reference expression data
BioGPS	n/a
Gene ontology
Molecular function	hormone activity
Cellular component	extracellular region; extracellular space; cytoplasm
Biological process	peptide hormone processing; apoptotic process; signal transduction; female gamete generation; cell-cell signaling; regulation of transcription by RNA polymerase II; regulation of signaling receptor activity; hormone-mediated signaling pathway; G protein-coupled receptor signaling pathway
Sources:Amigo / QuickGO
Orthologs
Databases	NCBI: entry; OMA: entry
Species	Human	Mouse
Entrez	1082	n/a
Ensembl	ENSG00000104827	n/a
UniProt	P0DN86	n/a
RefSeq (mRNA)	NM_000737	n/a
RefSeq (protein)	NP_000728.1; NP_149032.1; NP_149133.1; NP_149439.1; NP_149032 NP_149439	n/a
Location (UCSC)	Chr 19: 49.02 – 49.02 Mb	n/a
PubMed search		n/a
- Wikidata
View/Edit Human

Choriogonadotropin subunit beta (CG-beta) also known as chorionic gonadotrophin chain beta is a protein that in humans is encoded by the CGB gene.

This gene is a member of the glycoprotein hormone beta chain family and encodes the beta 3 subunit of chorionic gonadotropin (CG). Glycoprotein hormones are heterodimers consisting of a common alpha subunit and a unique beta subunit which confers biological specificity. CG is produced by the trophoblastic cells of the placenta and stimulates the ovaries to synthesize the steroids that are essential for the maintenance of pregnancy. The beta subunit of CG is encoded by 6 genes which are arranged in tandem and inverted pairs on chromosome 19q13.3 and contiguous with the luteinizing hormone beta subunit gene.

== Structure ==
CGB is composed of 165 amino acids, and has a molecular weight of 17.739 kDa. On this polypeptide, there are 7 total sites of glycosylation, encompassing 28 total N-linked glycans at 2 sites and 15 total O-linked glycans at 5 sites. The sites of N-glycoslylation occur at Asn33 and Asn50. The sites of O-glycoslyation occur at Ser138, Ser141, Ser147, Ser152, and Ser158. There are also three sites of phosphorylation, occurring at Ser86, Ser116, and Thr117. There are six disulfide pairings, occurring at 9-57, 23-72, 26-110, 34-88, 38-90, and 93-100. Additionally, there are 10 known locations of mutation on the CGB polypeptide, occurring at amino acid positions 33, 35, 50, 52, 137, 138, 141, 147, 152, and 158. There is an alpha helix from amino acid positions 1-15, and a turn from positions 115-117. There are also beta sheets from positions 47-60, 67-69, 75-88, 99-112, and 118-121. The polypeptide of CGB is also unusually flexible when compared to other polypeptides of similar structure and function. Its level of glycosylation has also been referred to as an 'extreme concentration', with baseline Human Chorionic Gonadotropin (hCG) being 30% glycosylated by weight, up to the 42% glycosylation of the 'hyperglocysolated hCG' by weight. The whole hCG protein hormone is a heterodimer, with an alpha and a beta subunit. The alpha subunit is identical in the hCG protein hormone, the Luteinizing Hormone (LH), the Follicle Stimulating Hormone (FSH), and the Thyroid Stimulating Hormone (TSH). It is specifically the beta subunit for each of these hormones that determines its specificity and function. Even further, the beta subunits of hCG, LH, FSH, and TSH show a high degree of sequence similarity in the first 114 amino acids of the polypeptide, with LH showing 85% similarity, FSH showing 36% similarity, and TSH showing 46% similarity. One likely reason for such high sequence similarity in hCG and LH is the fact that both respective beta subunits both bind to the same receptor, with their homology illustrating a common biological function and biochemical pathway.

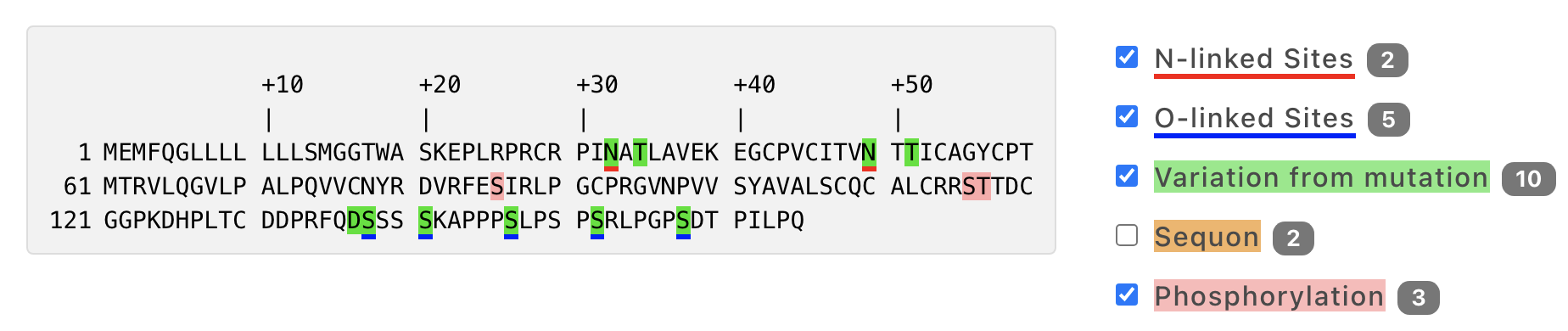
Amino acid sequence of CGB, with sites of glycosylation, mutation, and phosphorylation notated

== Coding and Homology ==
The very first nucleotide sequence of the gene encoding for the beta subunit of human chorionic gonadotropin (CGB) suggests that CGB evolved from a duplicate copy of the beta subunit of LH, another glycoprotein hormone with significant influence over pregnancy, expressed in the anterior pituitary gland. Subsequent nuclear mapping has found that humans possess six copies of the CGB gene, amazingly found together with the LHB gene on chromosome 19q13.33. Human CGB and LHB genes share an extremely high degree of similarity in their sequences, clocking in at 94% similarity. This nucleotide sequence is encompassed by 3 exons. Of the six genes that encode for CGB, four of them are functional. These include CGB, CGB5, CGB7, and CGB8. These four genes share a 97-99% DNA sequence similarity, and code for the biochemically functional beta subunit of hCG. Although CGB1 and CGB2 genes are similar in sequence to the other four genes previously mentioned (85%), they encode for a novel hypothetical protein that is 132 amino acids in length and does not share any homology to the functional CGB subunit. This particular result was caused by a DNA fragment insertion into the 5' untranslated region (UTR) of the CGB1 and CGB2 genes, giving way to a novel exon one and creating a single basepair open reading frame shift for exons two and three.

== Function ==
While the whole hCG glycoprotein hormone is a heterodimer consisting of an alpha and a beta subunit, it is the beta subunit alone that is responsible for the specificity of function of hCG. Thus, in this section, we will be referring to hCG as the specific beta subunit CGB, due to the subunit being solely responsible for its relevant function in pregnancy. CGB is only produced by the human body during pregnancy. CGB is the very first specific molecule synthesized by the embryo, with its RNA transcribed as early as the eight-cell stage. It is the trophoblast, which is the outer layer of the blastocyst, that first synthesizes this glycoprotein hormone. The blastocyst will become the embryo, and the trophoblast will eventually become part of the placenta. The blastocyst/trophoblast release CGB into the uterine space, which is somehow able to reach the hCG/LH receptor on the endometrial surface. Again, it is specifically the beta subunit of hCG (and also LH) that binds to the receptor, as the alpha subunits of both hormones, as well as FSH and TSH, are the same. This nonvascular communication by CGB is highly remarkable, and it is still not fully understood how CGB is able to communicate with the endometrial surface without being attached to it. Binding of CGB to the hCG/LH receptor prepares the endometrium for the impending implantation of the blastocyst. CGB implements immunotolerance and angiogenesis at the endometrial maternal-fetal interface, which is particularly critical to the establishment of a successful pregnancy. By stimulating this angio- and vasculogenesis, CGB provides the placenta with a sufficient maternal blood supply, thus providing the embryo with the crucial nutrition it needs during its invasion of the uterine endometrium. As a more comprehensive overview: CGB promotes progesterone production by corpus luteal cells, promotes angiogenesis in uterine vasculature, promotes the fusion of cytotrophoblast cells and the subsequent differentiation to make syncytiotrophoblast cells, promotes the blockage of any immune or macrophage action by the maternal immune system on foreign invading placental cells, initiates proper and appropriate uterine growth parallel to fetal growth, suppresses any myometrial contractions during the course of pregnancy, stimulates growth and differentiation of the umbilical cord, prepares the endometrium for the approaching embryo implantation, acts on a receptor in mother's brain causing severe nausea and vomiting, and has also been shown to promote the growth of fetal organs during pregnancy.

=== Immunomodulatory Properties ===
One critical action of CGB, among many, is the immunomodulatory effects that it has on the maternal response to the embryo. This activation of a highly specific immune system tolerance to the embryo is essential to preventing the rejection of the embryo by the maternal immune system, and therefore the successful embryo development and implantation. While miscarriages and spontaneous abortions obviously have a multitude of different causes, the maternal immune response to the implanting embryo is one of the major ones, with specific action being related to CD4+ T cells of the immune system. In order to effectively describe their influence on whether a pregnancy is successful or not, a brief overview of these cells is needed. They are classified into 4 different subsets: T helper (Th) 1, Th2, Th17, and T regulatory (Treg) cells. Studies have indicated that patients who suffer from recurrent miscarriages possess an immunity dominated by what is called the Th1/Th2 hypothesis. But subsequent studies have shown that the Th1/Th2 paradigm is not sufficient to describe the immunological affects by which the fetus is rejected, and has thus been expanded to the Th1/Th2/Th17 and Treg cell paradigm. Th17 and Treg cells, according to the field of immunology, have been described as lymphocyte subsets that show a clear differentiation from Th1 and Th2 cells. They play a major role in the development of autoimmune diseases and infection. Multiple studies have reported that a Th17/Treg imbalance is associated with recurrent spontaneous abortion. And while many studies have discussed and illustrated the immunosuppressive effects of CGB on T-cell proliferation, others have shown a contradictory trophic effect, further deepening the notion of an immunosuppressive pregnancy environment brought on by CGB. CGB encourages trophoblast invasion and interstitial theca cell proliferation through the overmodulation of extracellular-regulated kinase (ERK) and AKT signals, and the instigation of leptin production by CGB requires a dialogue between cAMP and p38 signaling pathways in the syncytiotrophoblast. It has also been shown that CGB has a positive impact on the proliferation of CD4+25+ T cells and that it attracts these cells to the endometrium in early pregnancy. Immune cells located at the implantation site actively contribute to embryo implantation. And so, through the modulation of inflammatory-promoting Th1 cells and anti-inflammatory Th2 cells, CGB plays a critically important role in the successful implantation of the embryo to the endometrial wall.

=== Vasculogenic and Angiogenic Properties ===
The angiogenic effect of CGB on endothelial cells is precisely mediated through the activation of hCG/LH receptor and PKA/cAMP pathway. It is through the binding of CGB to the hCG/LH receptor that the PKA/cAMP pathway is activated, which then helps stimulate angiogenesis and the establishment of a two-way nutrient highway for the embryo and subsequent fetus. Dibutyryl cAMP then stimulates vessel outgrowth from aortic ring, which further suggests the importance of the PKA pathway, as well as its preceding CGB pathway, during this angiogenic response. And so, clear direct angiogenic effects of CGB have been observed and substantiated on endothelial cells in the aortic ring, CAM, matrigel plug, and endothelial cell proliferation. In a normal pregnancy, CGB expression is associated with endometrial stimulation of angiogenesis occurring early in gestation, while also increasing the blood supply and altering the uterine vasculature through vasodilatation, increasing permeability, development, and maturation of new vessels.

=== Stimulation of Other Relevant Pregnancy Hormones ===
CGB triggers the body to create more estrogen and progesterone. In tandem with CGB, the increased estrogen and progesterone signal to the body that pregnancy is occurring, and help thicken the uterine lining and stop menstruation. It is the precise balance of these three hormones that help to sustain and maintain a healthy pregnancy. More specifically, CGB is a luteotropic hormone that promotes the survival and steroidogenic activity of corpus luteum by acting through luteinizing hormone receptors (LHRs) expressed on luteinized theca and granulosa cells. Through this activation, the corpus luteum produces the progesterone needed for the subsequent stages of pregnancy. This helps to keep the highly crucial corpus luteum alive and activated.
