= TSHB =

Protein-coding gene in humans

Identifiers
- Aliases: TSHB, TSH-B, TSH-BETA, thyroid stimulating hormone beta, Thyroid stimulating hormone, beta, thyroid stimulating hormone subunit beta
- External IDs: OMIM: 188540; MGI: 98848; GeneCards: TSHB

Gene location (Human)
Chr.	Chromosome 1 (human)
Band	1p13.2	Start	115,029,826 bp
Band	1p13.2	End	115,034,302 bp

Gene location (Mouse)
Chr.	Chromosome 3 (mouse)
Band	3 F2.2|3 45.25 cM	Start	102,682,781 bp
Band	3 F2.2|3 45.25 cM	End	102,690,034 bp
RNA expression pattern
Bgee	Human / Mouse (ortholog); Top expressed in: anterior pituitary; testicle; buccal mucosa cell; tibialis anterior muscle; tibial arteries; gastric mucosa; islet of Langerhans; Descending thoracic aorta; body of uterus; Achilles tendon / Top expressed in: pituitary gland; median eminence; anterior pituitary; arcuate nucleus; left lung lobe; embryo; pars tuberalis; granulocyte; pars distalis of adenohypophysis; ascending aorta; More reference expression data
BioGPS	n/a
Gene ontology
Molecular function	hormone activity
Cellular component	extracellular region; extracellular space; cytoplasm
Biological process	response to calcium ion; cell-cell signaling; anatomical structure morphogenesis; G protein-coupled receptor signaling pathway; response to vitamin A; peptide hormone processing; response to estrogen; hormone-mediated signaling pathway; regulation of signaling receptor activity
Sources:Amigo / QuickGO
Orthologs
Databases	NCBI: entry; OMA: entry
Species	Human	Mouse
Entrez	7252	22094
Ensembl	ENSG00000134200	ENSMUSG00000027857
UniProt	P01222	P12656
RefSeq (mRNA)	NM_000549; NM_001277991	NM_001165939; NM_001165940; NM_009432
RefSeq (protein)	NP_000540; NP_001264920	NP_001159411; NP_001159412; NP_033458
Location (UCSC)	Chr 1: 115.03 – 115.03 Mb	Chr 3: 102.68 – 102.69 Mb
PubMed search
- Wikidata
View/Edit Human	View/Edit Mouse

Thyroid stimulating hormone, beta also known as TSHB is a protein which in humans is encoded by the TSHB gene.

== Function ==
Thyrotropin-stimulating hormone (TSH) is a noncovalently linked glycoprotein heterodimer and is part of a family of pituitary hormones containing a common alpha subunit (TSHA) and a unique beta subunit (this protein) that confers specificity.

== See also ==
- thyroid stimulating hormone
