= CGB2 =

CGB2 may refer to:

- CGB2 (gene)
- Carstairs/Bishell's Airport, Alberta, Canada: Transport Canada Location indicator: CGB2
