= CGB5 =

Protein-coding gene in humans

Identifiers
- Aliases: CGB5, HCG, CGB, hCGB, chorionic gonadotropin beta subunit 5, chorionic gonadotropin subunit beta 5
- External IDs: OMIM: 608825; GeneCards: CGB5
Available structures
PDB	Human UniProt search: PDBe RCSB
PDB	List of PDB id codes 1HCN, 1HRP, 1QFW,%%s1QFW, 1HCN, 1HRP

Gene location (Human)
Chr.	Chromosome 19 (human)
Band	19q13.33	Start	49,043,848 bp
Band	19q13.33	End	49,045,311 bp
RNA expression pattern
Bgee	Human / Mouse (ortholog); Top expressed in: placenta; gonad; pituitary gland; anterior pituitary; duodenum; embryo; muscle tissue; left testis; body of pancreas; smooth muscle tissue / n/a; More reference expression data
BioGPS	n/a
Gene ontology
Molecular function	hormone activity
Cellular component	extracellular region; extracellular space; cytoplasm
Biological process	peptide hormone processing; apoptotic process; signal transduction; female gamete generation; cell-cell signaling; regulation of transcription by RNA polymerase II; regulation of signaling receptor activity; hormone-mediated signaling pathway; G protein-coupled receptor signaling pathway
Sources:Amigo / QuickGO
Orthologs
Databases	NCBI: entry; OMA: entry
Species	Human	Mouse
Entrez	93659	n/a
Ensembl	ENSG00000189052	n/a
UniProt	P0DN86	n/a
RefSeq (mRNA)	NM_033043	n/a
RefSeq (protein)	NP_000728.1; NP_149032.1; NP_149133.1; NP_149439.1; NP_149032 NP_149439	n/a
Location (UCSC)	Chr 19: 49.04 – 49.05 Mb	n/a
PubMed search		n/a
- Wikidata
View/Edit Human

Chorionic gonadotropin, beta polypeptide 5 is a protein that in humans is encoded by the CGB5 gene.

== Function ==
This gene is a member of the glycoprotein hormone beta chain family and encodes the beta 5 subunit of chorionic gonadotropin (CG). Glycoprotein hormones are heterodimers consisting of a common alpha subunit and a unique beta subunit which confers biological specificity. CG is produced by the trophoblastic cells of the placenta and stimulates the ovaries to synthesize the steroids that are essential for the maintenance of pregnancy. The beta subunit of CG is encoded by 6 genes which are arranged in tandem and inverted pairs on chromosome 19q13.3 and contiguous with the luteinizing hormone beta subunit gene. [provided by RefSeq, Jul 2008].
