= Chennai Central–Thiruvananthapuram Central Super AC Superfast Express =

Indian express train service

MGR Chennai Central – Thiruvananthapuram Central Super AC Superfast Express
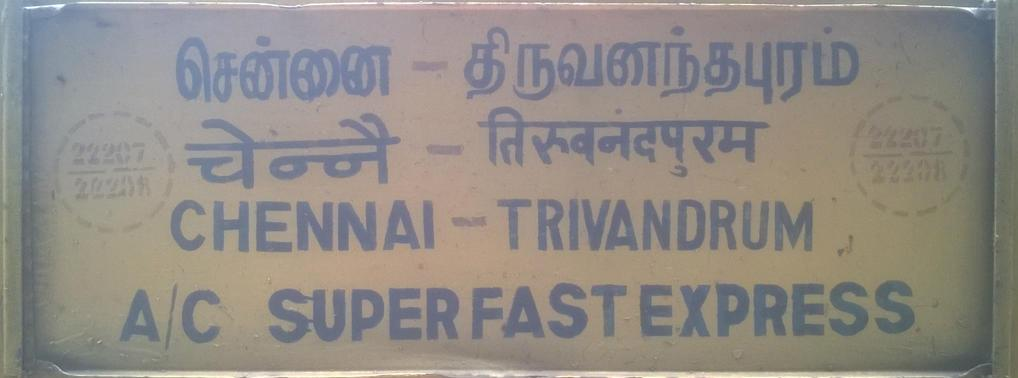

Overview
- Service type: AC Superfast Express
- Status: In Operation
- Locale: Tamil Nadu, Kerala
- Predecessor: Chennai Central - Thiruvananthapuram Duronto Express
- First service: 15 December 2012; 13 years ago
- Current operator: Southern Railways

Route
- Distance travelled: 905 km (562 mi)
- Average journey time: 15 hours 10 minutes
- Service frequency: Bi-weekly
- Train number: 22207/22208

On-board services
- Classes: AC 1st Class, AC 2 Tier, AC 3 Tier, pantry car
- Seating arrangements: Yes
- Sleeping arrangements: Yes
- Catering facilities: Yes
- Observation facilities: Large windows

Technical
- Rolling stock: LHB
- Track gauge: Broad Gauge
- Electrification: Yes, 25kV AC OHE
- Depot: Chennai
- Track owner: Southern Railways
- Rake maintenance: Chennai
Route map
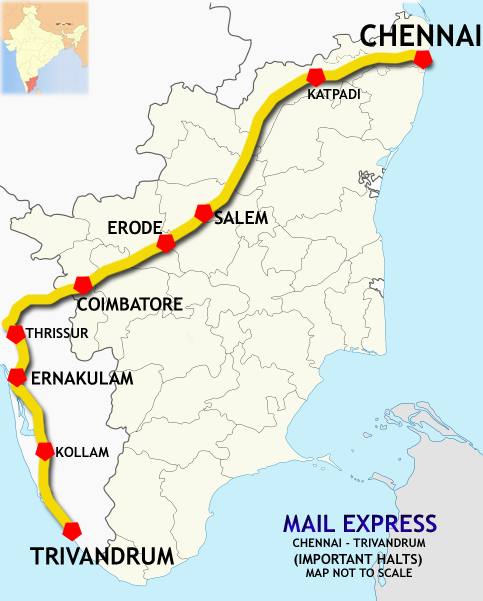

The MGR Chennai Central – Thiruvananthapuram Super AC Express (train number 22207 and 22208, formerly Duronto Express) is a premium train service of the Indian Railways, announced in the 2011–12 Railway Budget. It connects Chennai, Tamil Nadu to Thiruvananthapuram, Kerala. As of today, it is the only Super AC Express remains in operation and rest all other services has been phased out and withdrawn gradually. Super AC Express are the premium end service Air Conditioned trains which operates on Rajdhani/Duronto Fare.

== Stops ==
- Thiruvananthapuram Central railway station
- Kollam Junction railway station
- Alappuzha railway station
- Ernakulam Junction
- Thrissur railway station
- Palakkad Junction
- Coimbatore Junction
- Erode Junction
- Salem Junction
- Katpadi Junction
- Puratchi Thalaivar Dr. M. G. Ramachandran Central railway station (Chennai Central)

== See also ==
- Chennai Central
- Thiruvananthapuram Central
