= LHB =

LHB may refer to:

- The University of Texas Longhorn Band, a marching band
- Linke-Hofmann-Busch, now Alstom Transport Deutschland, a German rail vehicle manufacturer
- LHB coach, passenger coaches of Indian Railways
- Late Heavy Bombardment, a period in the Solar System's early history
- Left-handed bat, see batting (cricket)
- Local health board, of NHS Wales
- Luteinizing hormone beta polypeptide, a protein
