= CGB2 (gene) =

Protein-coding gene in humans

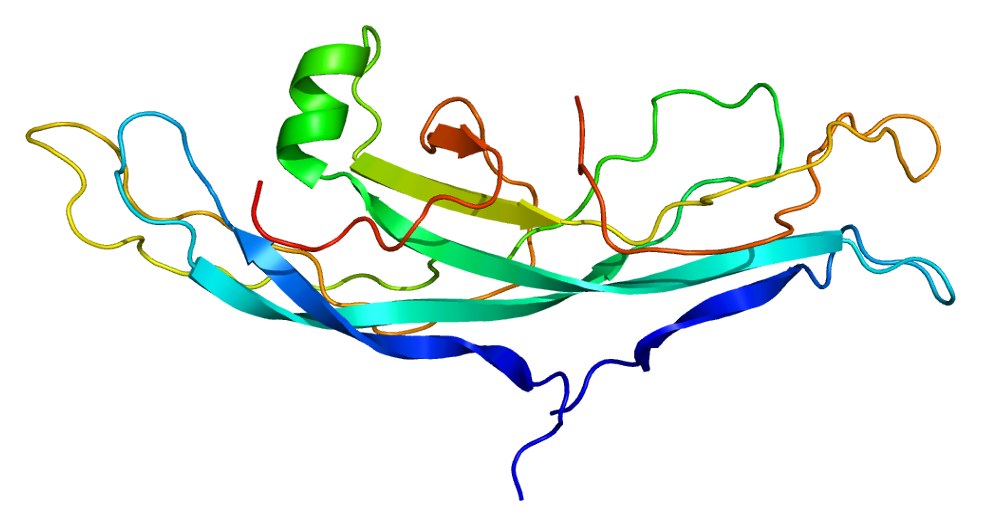

Identifiers
- Aliases: CGB2, chorionic gonadotropin beta subunit 2, chorionic gonadotropin subunit beta 2
- External IDs: OMIM: 608824; MGI: 96782; GeneCards: CGB2

Gene location (Human)
Chr.	Chromosome 19 (human)
Band	19q13.33	Start	49,031,890 bp
Band	19q13.33	End	49,033,238 bp
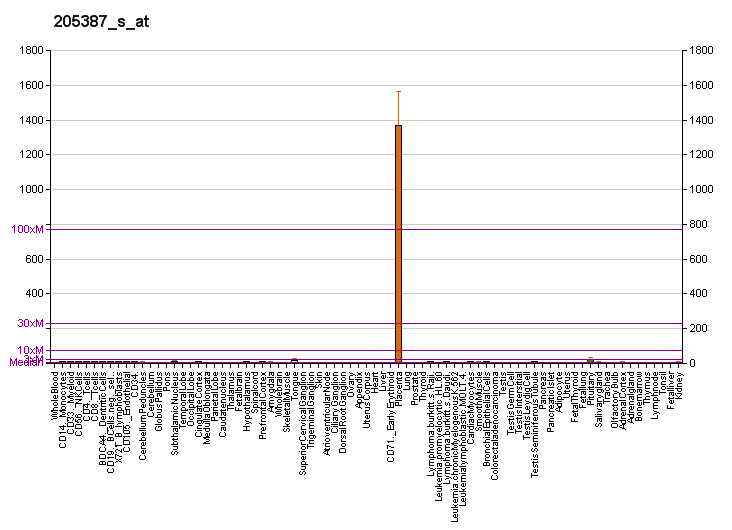
RNA expression pattern
Bgee	Human / Mouse (ortholog); Top expressed in: gonad; testicle; right testis; muscle of thigh; putamen; skeletal muscle tissue; left testis; placenta; caudate nucleus; hippocampus proper / n/a; More reference expression data
BioGPS	More reference expression data
Gene ontology
Molecular function	hormone activity
Cellular component	extracellular region; extracellular space; cytoplasm
Biological process	G protein-coupled receptor signaling pathway; cell-cell signaling; hormone-mediated signaling pathway; ovulation; regulation of signaling receptor activity
Sources:Amigo / QuickGO
Orthologs
Databases	NCBI: entry; OMA: entry
Species	Human	Mouse
Entrez	114336	16866
Ensembl	ENSG00000104818	ENSMUSG00000100916
UniProt	Q6NT52	O09108
RefSeq (mRNA)	NM_033378; NM_001319065	NM_008497
RefSeq (protein)	NP_001305994; NP_203696	NP_032523
Location (UCSC)	Chr 19: 49.03 – 49.03 Mb	n/a
PubMed search
- Wikidata
View/Edit Human	View/Edit Mouse

Choriogonadotropin subunit beta variant 2 is a protein that in humans is encoded by the CGB2 gene.

The beta subunit of chorionic gonadotropin (CGB) is encoded by six highly homologous and structurally similar genes that are arranged in tandem and inverted pairs on chromosome 19q13.3, and contiguous with the luteinizing hormone beta (LHB) subunit gene. The CGB genes are primarily distinguished by differences in the 5' untranscribed region. This gene was originally thought to be one of the two pseudogenes (CGB1 and CGB2) of CGB subunit, however, detection of CGB1 and CGB2 transcripts in vivo, and their presence on the polysomes, suggested that these transcripts are translated. To date, a protein product corresponding to CGB2 has not been isolated. The deduced sequence of the hypothetical protein of 132 aa does not share any similarity with that of functional CGB subunits. However, a 163 aa protein, translated from a different frame, is about the same size, and shares 98% identity with other CGB subunits.
