= Thyroid-stimulating hormone =

Family of glycoprotein hormones in vertebrata

Thyroid-stimulating hormone, alpha

Identifiers
- Symbol: CGA
- Alt. symbols: HCG, GPHa, GPHA1
- NCBI gene: 1081
- HGNC: 1885
- OMIM: 118850
- RefSeq: NM_000735
- UniProt: P01215

Other data
- Locus: Chr. 6 q14-q21
Search for
- Structures: Swiss-model
- Domains: InterPro

Thyroid-stimulating hormone, beta

Identifiers
- Symbol: TSHB
- NCBI gene: 7252
- HGNC: 12372
- OMIM: 188540
- RefSeq: NM_000549
- UniProt: P01222

Other data
- Locus: Chr. 1 p13
Search for
- Structures: Swiss-model
- Domains: InterPro

Thyroid-stimulating hormone (also known as thyrotropin, thyrotropic hormone, or abbreviated TSH) is a pituitary hormone that stimulates the thyroid gland to produce thyroxine (T_{4}), and then triiodothyronine (T_{3}) which stimulates the metabolism of almost every tissue in the body. It is a glycoprotein hormone produced by thyrotrope cells in the anterior pituitary gland, which regulates the endocrine function of the thyroid.

== Physiology ==
The system of the thyroid hormones T_{3} and T_{4}.

=== Hormone levels ===
TSH (with a half-life of about an hour) stimulates the thyroid gland to secrete the hormone thyroxine (T_{4}), which has only a slight effect on metabolism. T_{4} is converted to triiodothyronine (T_{3}), which is the active hormone that stimulates metabolism. About 80% of this conversion is in the liver and other organs, and 20% in the thyroid itself.

TSH is secreted throughout life but particularly reaches high levels during the periods of rapid growth and development, as well as in response to stress.

The hypothalamus, in the base of the brain, produces thyrotropin-releasing hormone (TRH). TRH stimulates the anterior pituitary gland to produce TSH.

Somatostatin is also produced by the hypothalamus, and has an opposite effect on the pituitary production of TSH, decreasing or inhibiting its release.

The concentration of thyroid hormones (T_{3} and T_{4}) in the blood regulates the pituitary release of TSH; when T_{3} and T_{4} concentrations are low, the production of TSH is increased, and, conversely, when T_{3} and T_{4} concentrations are high, TSH production is decreased. This is an example of a negative feedback loop. Any inappropriateness of measured values, for instance a low-normal TSH together with a low-normal T_{4} may signal tertiary (central) disease and a TSH to TRH pathology. Elevated reverse T_{3} (RT_{3}) together with low-normal TSH and low-normal T_{3}, T_{4} values, which is regarded as indicative for euthyroid sick syndrome, may also have to be investigated for chronic subacute thyroiditis (SAT) with output of subpotent hormones. Absence of antibodies in patients with diagnoses of an autoimmune thyroid in their past would always be suspicious for development to SAT even in the presence of a normal TSH because there is no known recovery from autoimmunity.

For clinical interpretation of laboratory results it is important to acknowledge that TSH is released in a pulsatile manner resulting in both circadian and ultradian rhythms of its serum concentrations.

=== Subunits ===
TSH is a glycoprotein and consists of two subunits, the alpha and the beta subunit.

- The α (alpha) subunit (i.e., chorionic gonadotropin alpha) is nearly identical to that of human chorionic gonadotropin (hCG), luteinizing hormone (LH), and follicle-stimulating hormone (FSH). The α subunit is thought to be the effector region responsible for stimulation of adenylate cyclase (involved the generation of cAMP). The α chain has a 92-amino acid sequence.
- The β (beta) subunit (TSHB) is unique to TSH, and therefore determines its receptor specificity. The β chain has a 118-amino acid sequence.

=== The TSH receptor ===
The TSH receptor is found mainly on thyroid follicular cells. Stimulation of the receptor increases T_{3} and T_{4} production and secretion. This occurs through stimulation of six steps in thyroid hormone synthesis: (1) Up-regulating the activity of the sodium-iodide symporter (NIS) on the basolateral membrane of thyroid follicular cells, thereby increasing intracellular concentrations of iodine (iodine trapping). (2) Stimulating iodination of thyroglobulin in the follicular lumen, a precursor protein of thyroid hormone. (3) Stimulating the conjugation of iodinated tyrosine residues. This leads to the formation of thyroxine (T_{4}) and triiodothyronine (T_{3}) that remain attached to the thyroglobulin protein. (4) Increased endocytosis of the iodinated thyroglobulin protein across the apical membrane back into the follicular cell. (5) Stimulation of proteolysis of iodinated thyroglobulin to form free thyroxine (T_{4}) and triiodothyronine (T_{3}). (6) Secretion of thyroxine (T_{4}) and triiodothyronine (T_{3}) across the basolateral membrane of follicular cells to enter the circulation. This occurs by an unknown mechanism.

Stimulating antibodies to the TSH receptor mimic TSH and cause Graves' disease. In addition, hCG shows some cross-reactivity to the TSH receptor and therefore can stimulate production of thyroid hormones. In pregnancy, prolonged high concentrations of hCG can produce a transient condition termed gestational hyperthyroidism. This is also the mechanism of trophoblastic tumors increasing the production of thyroid hormones.

== Applications ==
=== Diagnostics ===
Reference ranges for TSH may vary slightly, depending on the method of analysis, and do not necessarily equate to cut-offs for diagnosing thyroid dysfunction. In the UK, guidelines issued by the Association for Clinical Biochemistry suggest a reference range of 0.4–4.0 μIU/mL (or mIU/L). The National Academy of Clinical Biochemistry (NACB) stated that it expected the reference range for adults to be reduced to 0.4–2.5 μIU/mL, because research had shown that adults with an initially measured TSH level of over 2.0 μIU/mL had "an increased odds ratio of developing hypothyroidism over the [following] 20 years, especially if thyroid antibodies were elevated".

TSH concentrations in children are normally higher than in adults. In 2002, the NACB recommended age-related reference limits starting from about 1.3 to 19 μIU/mL for normal-term infants at birth, dropping to 0.6–10 μIU/mL at 10 weeks old, 0.4–7.0 μIU/mL at 14 months and gradually dropping during childhood and puberty to adult levels, 0.3–3.0 μIU/mL.

==== Diagnosis of disease ====
TSH concentrations are measured as part of a thyroid function test in patients suspected of having an excess (hyperthyroidism) or deficiency (hypothyroidism) of thyroid hormones. Interpretation of the results depends on both the TSH and T_{4} concentrations. In some situations measurement of T_{3} may also be useful.

Source of pathology	TSH level	Thyroid hormone level	Disease causing conditions
Hypothalamus/pituitary	High	High	Benign tumor of the pituitary (adenoma) or thyroid hormone resistance
Hypothalamus/pituitary	Low	Low	Secondary hypothyroidism or "central" hypothyroidism
Hyperthyroidism	Low	High	Primary hyperthyroidism i.e. Graves' disease
Hypothyroidism	High	Low	Congenital hypothyroidism, Primary hypothyroidism i.e. Hashimoto's thyroiditis

A TSH assay is now also the recommended screening tool for thyroid disease. Recent advances in increasing the sensitivity of the TSH assay make it a better screening tool than free T_{4}.

==== Monitoring ====
The therapeutic target range TSH level for patients on treatment ranges between 0.3 and 3.0 μIU/mL.

For hypothyroid patients on thyroxine, measurement of TSH alone is generally considered sufficient. An increase in TSH above the normal range indicates under-replacement or poor compliance with therapy. A significant reduction in TSH suggests over-treatment. In both cases, a change in dose may be required. A low or low-normal TSH value may also signal pituitary disease in the absence of replacement.

For hyperthyroid patients, both TSH and T_{4} are usually monitored. In pregnancy, TSH measurements do not seem to be a good marker for the well-known association of maternal thyroid hormone availability with offspring neurocognitive development.

TSH distribution progressively shifts toward higher concentrations with age.

==== Difficulties with interpretation of TSH measurement ====
- Heterophile antibodies (which include human anti-mouse antibodies (HAMA) and Rheumatoid Factor (RF)), which bind weakly to the test assay's animal antibodies, causing a higher (or less commonly lower) TSH result than the actual true TSH level. Although the standard lab assay panels are designed to remove moderate levels of heterophilic antibodies, these fail to remove higher antibody levels. "Dr. Baumann [from Mayo Clinic] and her colleagues found that 4.4 percent of the hundreds of samples she tested were affected by heterophile antibodies.........The hallmark of this condition is a discrepancy between TSH value and free T4 value, and most important between laboratory values and patient's conditions. Endocrinologists, in particular, should be on alert for this."
- Macro-TSH - endogenous antibodies bind to TSH reducing its activity, so the pituitary gland would need to produce more TSH to obtain the same overall level of TSH activity.
- TSH Isomers - natural variations of the TSH molecule, which have lower activity, so the pituitary gland would need to produce more TSH to obtain the same overall level of TSH activity.
- The same TSH concentration may have a different meaning whether it is used for diagnosis of thyroid dysfunction or for monitoring of substitution therapy with levothyroxine. Reasons for this lack of generalisation are Simpson's paradox and the fact that the TSH-T3 shunt is disrupted in treated hypothyroidism, so that the shape of the relation between free T4 and TSH concentration is distorted.

=== Therapeutic ===
Thyroid-stimulating hormone INN: thyrotropin alfa
Clinical data
- Trade names: Thyrogen
- ATC code: H01AB01 (WHO)

Legal status
- Legal status: US: ℞-only; EU: Rx-only

Identifiers
- CAS Number: 194100-83-9
- UNII: AVX3D5A4LM
- CompTox Dashboard (EPA): DTXSID60904318
- ECHA InfoCard: 100.029.683

Synthetic recombinant human TSH alpha (rhTSHα or simply rhTSH) or thyrotropin alfa (INN) is manufactured by Genzyme Corp under the trade name Thyrogen. It is used to manipulate endocrine function of thyroid-derived cells, as part of the diagnosis and treatment of thyroid cancer.

A Cochrane review compared treatments using recombinant human thyrotropin-aided radioactive iodine to radioactive iodine alone. In this review it was found that the recombinant human thyrotropin-aided radioactive iodine appeared to lead to a greater reduction in thyroid volume at the increased risk of hypothyroidism. No conclusive data on changes in quality of life with either treatments were found.

== History ==
In 1916, Bennett M. Allen and Philip E. Smith found that the pituitary contained a thyrotropic substance. The first standardised purification protocol for this thyrotropic hormone was described by Charles George Lambie and Victor Trikojus, working at the University of Sydney in 1937.
