= Luteinizing hormone beta polypeptide =

Protein-coding gene in the species Homo sapiens

LHB

Identifiers
- Aliases: LHB, CGB4, LSH-B, hHH23, Luteinizing hormone beta polypeptide, LSH-beta, Luteinizing hormone subunit beta
- External IDs: OMIM: 152780; MGI: 96782; GeneCards: LHB
Available structures
PDB	Ortholog search: PDBe RCSB
PDB	List of PDB id codes 1M92

Gene location (Human)
Chr.	Chromosome 19 (human)
Band	19q13.33	Start	49,015,980 bp
Band	19q13.33	End	49,017,091 bp
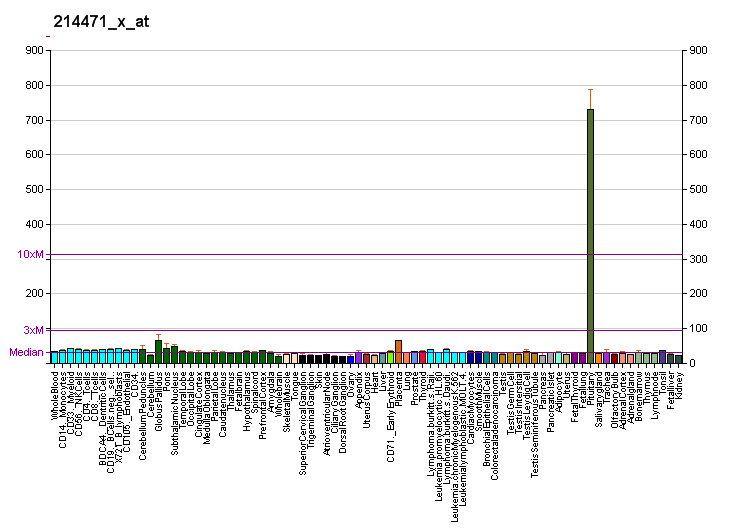
RNA expression pattern
Bgee	Human / Mouse (ortholog); Top expressed in: anterior pituitary; gonad; testicle; body of pancreas; endothelial cell; left testis; placenta; right testis; stromal cell of endometrium; body of stomach / n/a; More reference expression data
BioGPS	More reference expression data
Gene ontology
Molecular function	signaling receptor binding; hormone activity
Cellular component	Golgi lumen; extracellular region; extracellular space; cytoplasm
Biological process	cell-cell signaling; progesterone biosynthetic process; male gonad development; peptide hormone processing; signal transduction; hormone-mediated signaling pathway; ovulation; regulation of signaling receptor activity; G protein-coupled receptor signaling pathway
Sources:Amigo / QuickGO
Orthologs
Databases	NCBI: entry; OMA: entry
Species	Human	Mouse
Entrez	3972	16866
Ensembl	ENSG00000104826	ENSMUSG00000100916
UniProt	P01229	O09108
RefSeq (mRNA)	NM_000894	NM_008497
RefSeq (protein)	NP_000885	NP_032523
Location (UCSC)	Chr 19: 49.02 – 49.02 Mb	n/a
PubMed search
- Wikidata
View/Edit Human	View/Edit Mouse

Luteinizing hormone subunit beta also known as lutropin subunit beta or LHβ is a polypeptide that in association with an alpha subunit common to all gonadotropin hormones forms the reproductive signaling molecule luteinizing hormone. In humans it is encoded by the LHB gene.

== Gene ==
The luteinizing hormone beta subunit is encoded by a single gene in all mammals. In primates, this gene is located within a cluster that arose through gene duplication, and also includes multiple redundant genes encoding the beta subunit of chorionic gonadotropin as well as several nonfunctional pseudogenes. In humans these are contiguous on chromosome 19q13.3. In equids the beta subunit polypeptides of luteinizing hormone and chorionic gonadotropin are identical in sequence, differing only in their carbohydrate side-chains, and are the product of a single gene.

== Function ==
This gene is a member of the glycoprotein hormone beta chain family and encodes the beta subunit of luteinizing hormone (LH). Glycoprotein hormones are heterodimers consisting of a common alpha subunit and a unique beta subunit (this protein) which confers biological specificity. LH is expressed in the pituitary gland and promotes spermatogenesis and ovulation by stimulating the testes and ovaries to synthesize steroids.

== Clinical significance ==
Mutations in this gene are associated with hypogonadism which is characterized by infertility and pseudohermaphroditism.
