= Glycoprotein hormones, alpha polypeptide =

Mammalian protein found in Homo sapiens

CGA
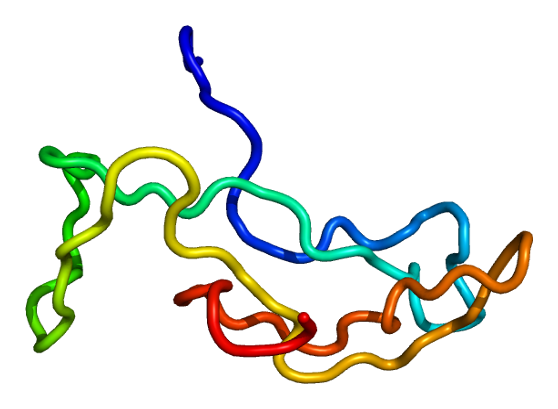

Identifiers
- Aliases: CGA, CG-ALPHA, FSHA, GPHA1, GPHa, HCG, LHA, TSHA, Chorionic gonadotropin alpha, glycoprotein hormones, alpha polypeptide, Alpha subunit of glycoprotein hormones, GPA1
- External IDs: OMIM: 118850; MGI: 88390; GeneCards: CGA
Available structures
PDB	Ortholog search: PDBe RCSB
PDB	List of PDB id codes 1DZ7, 1E9J, 1FL7, 1HCN, 1HD4, 1HRP, 1QFW, 1XWD, 4AY9, 4MQW

Gene location (Human)
Chr.	Chromosome 6 (human)
Band	6q14.3	Start	87,085,498 bp
Band	6q14.3	End	87,095,106 bp

Gene location (Mouse)
Chr.	Chromosome 4 (mouse)
Band	4 A5|4 16.86 cM	Start	34,893,779 bp
Band	4 A5|4 16.86 cM	End	34,907,370 bp
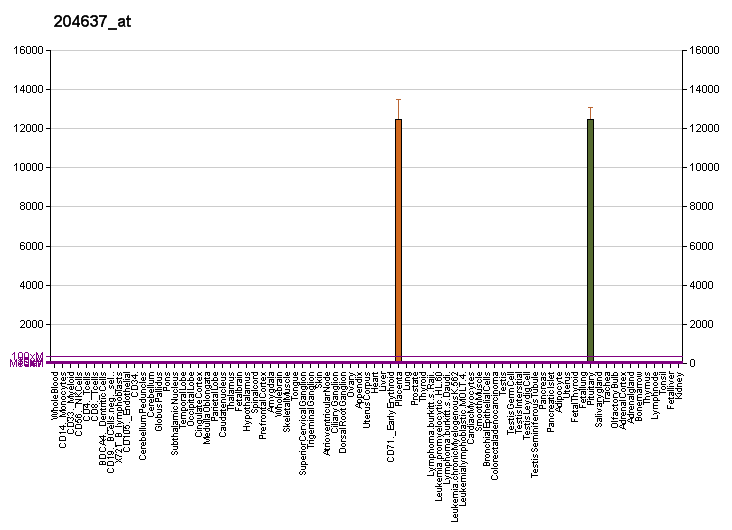
RNA expression pattern
Bgee	Human / Mouse (ortholog); Top expressed in: anterior pituitary; placenta; buccal mucosa cell; testicle; tail of epididymis; gonad; amniotic fluid; decidua; islet of Langerhans; hair follicle / Top expressed in: pituitary gland; median eminence; anterior pituitary; pars tuberalis; arcuate nucleus; pars distalis of adenohypophysis; morula; embryo; outer nuclear layer; blastocyst; More reference expression data
BioGPS	More reference expression data
Gene ontology
Molecular function	protein binding; hormone activity; follicle-stimulating hormone activity
Cellular component	Golgi lumen; extracellular region; extracellular space; follicle-stimulating hormone complex
Biological process	cell-cell signaling; peptide hormone processing; positive regulation of cell population proliferation; positive regulation of transcription by RNA polymerase II; signal transduction; positive regulation of cell migration; regulation of transcription by RNA polymerase II; regulation of signaling receptor activity; G protein-coupled receptor signaling pathway; positive regulation of steroid biosynthetic process; thyroid hormone generation
Sources:Amigo / QuickGO
Orthologs
Databases	NCBI: entry; OMA: entry
Species	Human	Mouse
Entrez	1081	12640
Ensembl	ENSG00000135346	ENSMUSG00000028298
UniProt	P01215	P01216
RefSeq (mRNA)	NM_001252383; NM_000735	NM_009889
RefSeq (protein)	NP_000726; NP_001239312	NP_034019
Location (UCSC)	Chr 6: 87.09 – 87.1 Mb	Chr 4: 34.89 – 34.91 Mb
PubMed search
- Wikidata
View/Edit Human	View/Edit Mouse

Glycoprotein hormones, alpha polypeptide is a protein that in humans is encoded by the CGA gene.

Thyroid-stimulating hormone (TSH) and the gonadotropin hormones human chorionic gonadotropin (hCG), luteinizing hormone (LH), and follicle-stimulating hormone (FSH) are heterodimers consisting of alpha and beta subunits (also called chains) that are associated non-covalently. The alpha subunits of these four human glycoprotein hormones are identical; however, their beta chains are unique and confer biological specificity. The protein encoded by this gene is the alpha subunit and belongs to the glycoprotein hormones alpha chain family. CGA levels are regulated by ELAVL1/HuR, and the small molecule Eltrombopag, which targets HuR/RNA interactions, has been shown to reduce CGA levels in human cultured cells.
