= Luteinizing hormone =

Gonadotropin secreted by the adenohypophysis

Chorionic Luteinizing hormone alpha
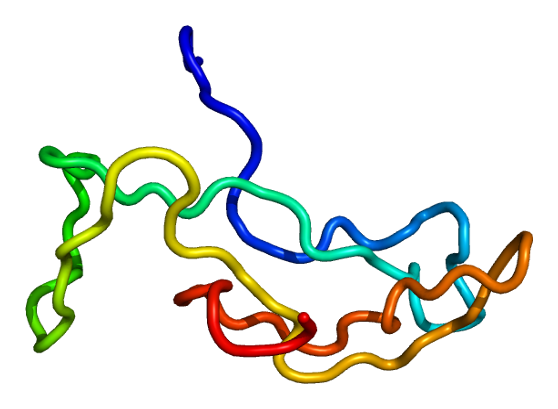

Identifiers
- Symbol: CGA
- Alt. symbols: HCG, GPHa, GPHA1
- NCBI gene: 1081
- HGNC: 1885
- OMIM: 118850
- RefSeq: NM_000735
- UniProt: P01215

Other data
- Locus: Chr. 6 q14-q21
Search for
- Structures: Swiss-model
- Domains: InterPro

Luteinizing hormone beta polypeptide

Identifiers
- Symbol: LHB
- NCBI gene: 3972
- HGNC: 6584
- OMIM: 152780
- RefSeq: NM_000894
- UniProt: P01229

Other data
- Locus: Chr. 19 q13.3
Search for
- Structures: Swiss-model
- Domains: InterPro

Luteinizing hormone (LH, also known as luteinising hormone, lutropin and sometimes lutrophin) is a hormone produced by gonadotropic cells in the anterior pituitary gland. The production of LH is regulated by gonadotropin-releasing hormone (GnRH) from the hypothalamus. In females, an acute rise of LH known as an LH surge, triggers ovulation and development of the corpus luteum. In males, where LH had also been called interstitial cell stimulating hormone (ICSH), it stimulates Leydig cell production of testosterone. It acts synergistically with follicle-stimulating hormone (FSH).

== Etymology ==
The term luteinizing comes from the Latin "luteus", meaning "yellow". This is in reference to the corpus luteum, which is a mass of cells that forms in an ovary after an ovum (egg) has been discharged. The corpus luteum is so named because it often has a distinctive yellow color. The process of forming the corpus luteum is known as "luteinization", and thus the hormone that triggers this process is termed the "luteinizing" hormone.

== Structure ==
LH is a heterodimeric glycoprotein. Each monomeric unit is a glycoprotein molecule; one alpha and one beta subunit make the full, functional protein.

Its structure is similar to that of the other glycoprotein hormones, follicle-stimulating hormone (FSH), thyroid-stimulating hormone (TSH), and human chorionic gonadotropin (hCG). The protein dimer contains 2 glycopeptidic subunits (labeled alpha- and beta- subunits) that are non-covalently associated:

- The alpha subunits of LH, FSH, TSH, and hCG are identical, and contain 92 amino acids in human but 96 amino acids in almost all other vertebrate species (glycoprotein hormones do not exist in invertebrates).
- The beta subunits vary. LH has a beta subunit of 120 amino acids (LHB) that confers its specific biologic action and is responsible for the specificity of the interaction with the LH receptor. This beta subunit contains an amino acid sequence that exhibits large homologies with that of the beta subunit of hCG and both stimulate the same receptor. However, the hCG beta subunit contains an additional 24 amino acids, and the two hormones differ in the composition of their sugar moieties.

The different composition of these oligosaccharides affects bioactivity and speed of degradation. The biologic half-life of LH is 20 minutes, shorter than that of FSH (3–4 hours) and hCG (24 hours). The biological half-life of LH is 23 hours subcutaneous or terminal half life of 10-12 hours.

== Genes ==
The gene for the alpha subunit is located on chromosome 6q12.21.

The luteinizing hormone beta subunit gene is localized in the LHB/CGB gene cluster on chromosome 19q13.32. In contrast to the alpha gene activity, beta LH subunit gene activity is restricted to the pituitary gonadotropic cells. It is regulated by the gonadotropin-releasing hormone from the hypothalamus. GnRH activates Egr1 which interacts with transcription factors NR5A1 and PITX1 at the gene promoter to up-regulate LHB transcription.

== Function ==
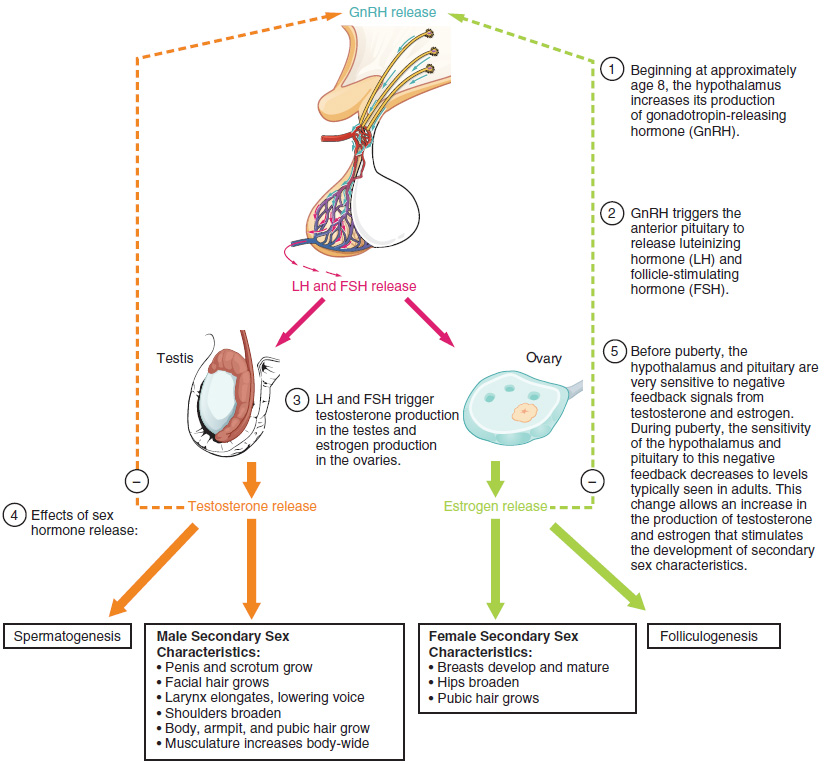
Effects of LH on the bodyErrata: LH promotes the growth of body, armpit, and pubic hair in both males and females.

In both males and females, LH works upon endocrine cells in the gonads to produce androgens.

=== Effects in females ===
LH supports theca cells in the ovaries that provide androgens and hormonal precursors for estradiol production. At the time of menstruation, FSH initiates follicular growth, specifically affecting granulosa cells. With the rise in estrogens, LH receptors are also expressed on the maturing follicle, which causes it to produce more estradiol. Eventually, when the follicle has fully matured, a spike in 17α-hydroxyprogesterone production by the follicle inhibits the production of estrogens. Previously, the preovulatory LH surge was attributed to a decrease in estrogen-mediated negative feedback of GnRH in the hypothalamus, subsequently stimulating the release of LH from the anterior pituitary. Some studies, however, attribute the LH surge to positive feedback from estradiol after production by the dominant follicle exceeds a certain threshold. Exceptionally high levels of estradiol induce hypothalamic production of progesterone, which stimulates elevated GnRH secretion, triggering a surge in LH. The increase in LH production only lasts for 24 to 48 hours. This "LH surge" triggers ovulation, thereby not only releasing the egg from the follicle, but also initiating the conversion of the residual follicle into a corpus luteum that, in turn, produces progesterone to prepare the endometrium for a possible implantation. LH is necessary to maintain luteal function for the second two weeks of the menstrual cycle. If pregnancy occurs, LH levels will decrease, and luteal function will instead be maintained by the action of hCG (human chorionic gonadotropin), a hormone very similar to LH but secreted from the new placenta.

Gonadal steroids (estrogens and androgens) generally have negative feedback effects on GnRH-1 release at the level of the hypothalamus and at the gonadotropes, reducing their sensitivity to GnRH. Positive feedback by estrogens also occurs in the gonadal axis of female mammals and is responsible for the midcycle surge of LH that stimulates ovulation. Although estrogens inhibit kisspeptin (Kp) release from kiss1 neurons in the ARC, estrogens stimulate Kp release from the Kp neurons in the anteroventral periventricular nucleus (AVPV). As estrogens' levels gradually increase the positive effect predominates, leading to the LH surge. GABA-secreting neurons that innervate GnRH-1 neurons also can stimulate GnRH-1 release. These GABA neurons also possess ERs and may be responsible for the GnRH-1 surge. Part of the inhibitory action of endorphins on GnRH-1 release is through inhibition of these GABA neurons. Rupture of the ovarian follicle at ovulation causes a drastic reduction in estrogen synthesis and a marked increase in secretion of progesterone by the corpus luteum in the ovary, reinstating a predominantly negative feedback on hypothalamic secretion of GnRH-1.

=== Effects in males ===
LH acts upon the Leydig cells of the testis and is regulated by gonadotropin-releasing hormone (GnRH). The Leydig cells produce testosterone under the control of LH. LH binds to LH receptors on the membrane surface of Leydig cells. Binding to this receptor causes an increase in cyclic adenosine monophosphate (cAMP), a secondary messenger, which allows cholesterol to translocate into the mitochondria. Within the mitochondria, cholesterol is converted to pregnenolone by CYP11A1. Pregnenolone is then converted to dehydroepiandrosterone (DHEA). DHEA is then converted to androstenedione by 3β-hydroxysteroid dehydrogenase (3β-HSD) and then finally converted to testosterone by 17β-hydroxysteroid dehydrogenase (HSD17B). The onset of puberty is controlled by two major hormones: FSH initiates spermatogenesis and LH signals the release of testosterone, an androgen that exerts both endocrine activity and intratesticular activity on spermatogenesis.

LH is released from the pituitary gland, and is controlled by pulses of gonadotropin-releasing hormone. When bloodstream testosterone levels are low, the pituitary gland is stimulated to release LH. As the levels of testosterone increase, it will act on the pituitary through a negative feedback loop and inhibit the release of GnRH and LH consequently. Androgens (including testosterone and dihydrotestosterone) inhibit monoamine oxidase (MAO) in the pineal gland, leading to increased melatonin and reduced LH and FSH by melatonin-induced increase of gonadotropin-inhibitory hormone (GnIH) synthesis and secretion. Testosterone can also be aromatized into estradiol (E2) to inhibit LH. E2 decreases pulse amplitude and responsiveness to GnRH from the hypothalamus onto the pituitary.

Changes in LH and testosterone blood levels and pulse secretions are induced by changes in sexual arousal in human males.

=== Effects in the brain ===
Luteinizing hormone receptors are located in areas of the brain associated with cognitive function. The role of LH role in the central nervous system (CNS) may be of relevance to understanding and treating post-menopausal cognitive decline.

Some research has observed an inverse relationship between circulating LH and CNS LH levels. After ovariectomy (a procedure used to mimic menopause) in female mice, circulating LH levels surge while CNS levels of LH fall. Treatments that lower circulating LH restore LH levels in the CNS.

== Normal levels ==
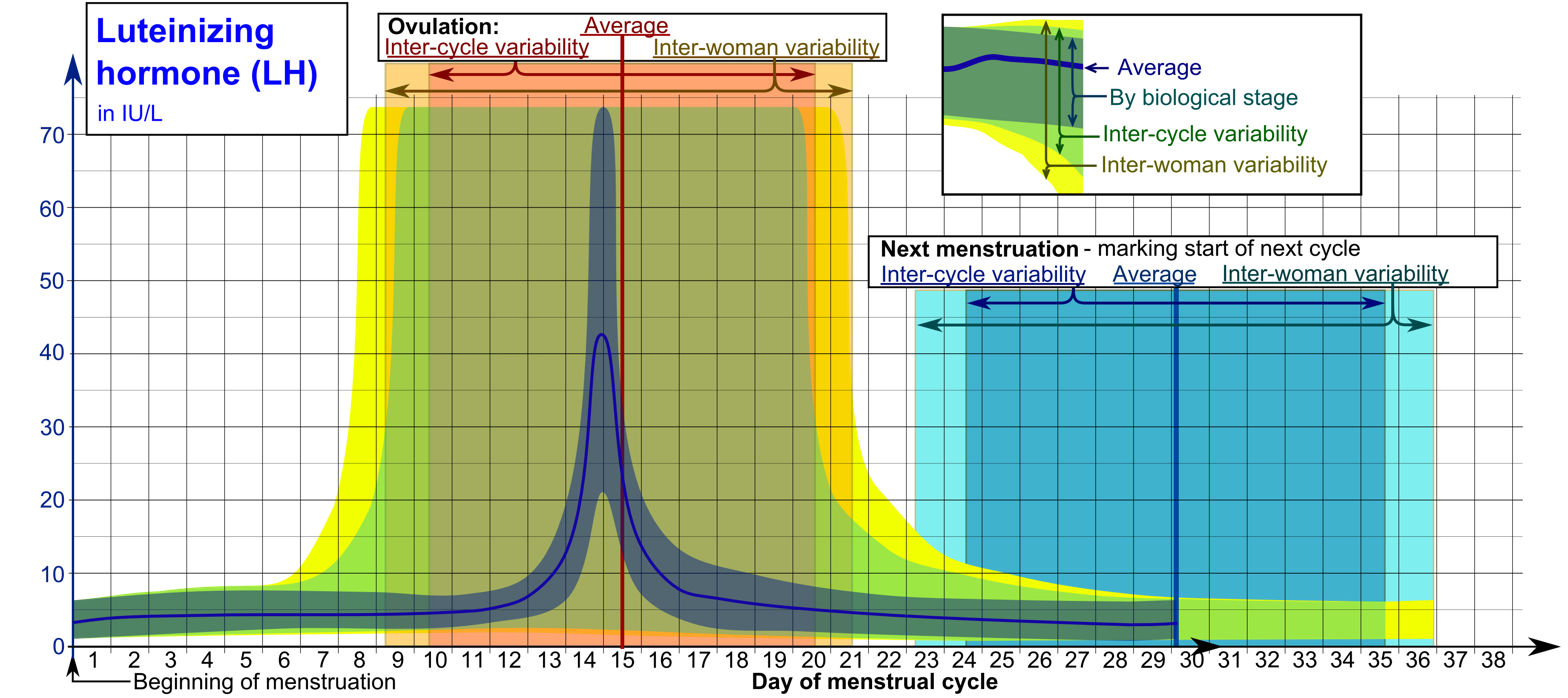
Reference ranges for the blood content of luteinizing hormone (LH) during the menstrual cycle.: The ranges denoted By biological stage may be used in closely monitored menstrual cycles in regard to other markers of its biological progression, with the time scale being compressed or stretched to how much faster or slower, respectively, the cycle progresses compared to an average cycle.; The ranges denoted Inter-cycle variability are more appropriate to use in non-monitored cycles with only the beginning of menstruation known, but where the woman accurately knows her average cycle lengths and time of ovulation, and that they are somewhat averagely regular, with the time scale being compressed or stretched to how much a woman's average cycle length is shorter or longer, respectively, than the average of the population.; The ranges denoted Inter-woman variability are more appropriate to use when the average cycle lengths and time of ovulation are unknown, but only the beginning of menstruation is given.

LH levels are normally low during childhood and in women, high after menopause. Since LH is secreted as pulses, it is necessary to follow its concentration over a sufficient period of time to get proper information about its blood level.

During reproductive years, typical levels are between 1 and 20 IU/L. Physiologic high LH levels are seen during the LH surge (v.s.) and typically last 48 hours.

In males over 18 years of age, reference ranges have been estimated to be 1.8–8.6 IU/L.

LH is measured in international units (IU). When quantifying the amount of LH in a sample in IUs, it is important to know which international standard your lot of LH was calibrated against since they can vary broadly from year to year. For human urinary LH, one IU is defined as 1/189th of an ampule denoted 96/602 and distributed by the NIBSC, corresponding to approximately 0.04656 μg of LH protein for a single IU, but older standard versions are still widely in use.

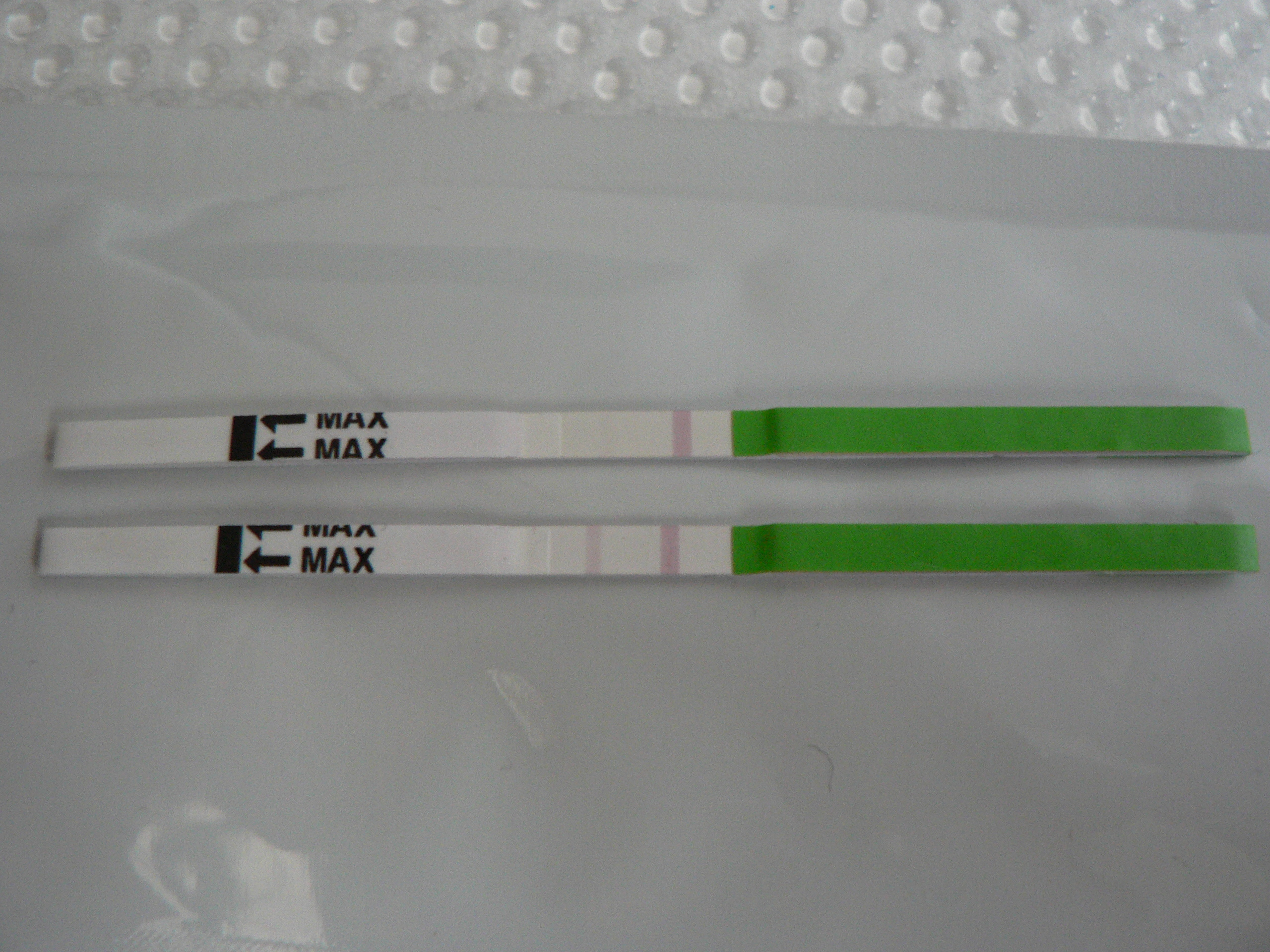
Lateral flow test strip for urine LH, used to predict ovulation

== Predicting ovulation ==
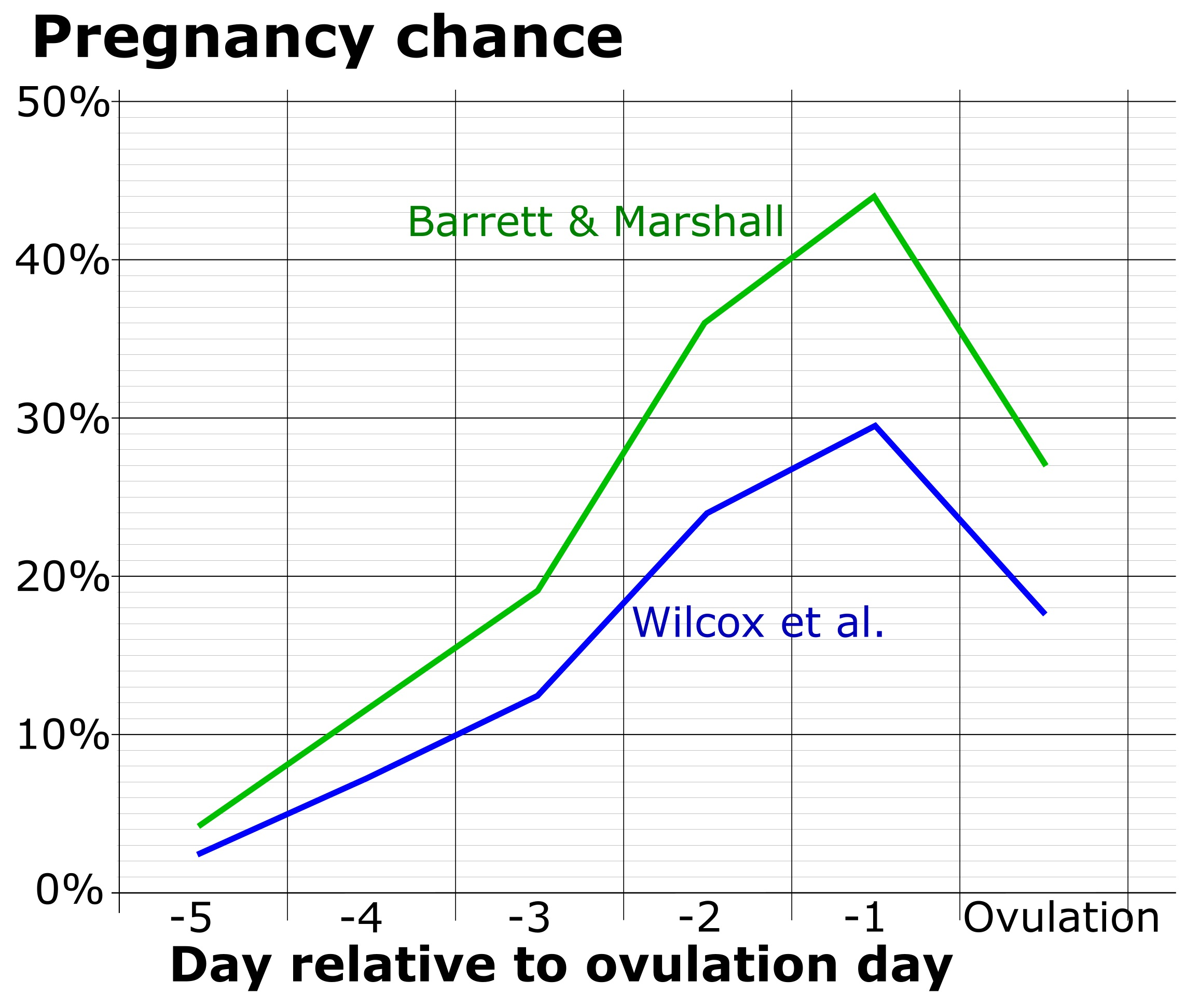
Chance of pregnancy by menstrual cycle day of insemination relative to ovulation

The detection of a surge in release of luteinizing hormone indicates impending ovulation. LH can be detected by urinary ovulation predictor kits (OPK, also LH-kit) that are performed, typically daily, around the time ovulation may be expected. A conversion from a negative to a positive reading would suggest that ovulation is about to occur within 24–48 hours, giving women two days to engage in sexual intercourse or artificial insemination with the intention of conceiving.

The recommended testing frequency differs between manufacturers. For example, the Clearblue test is taken daily, and an increased frequency does not decrease the risk of missing an LH surge. On the other hand, the Chinese company Nantong Egens Biotechnology recommends using their test twice per day. If testing once per day, no significant difference has been found between testing LH in the morning versus in the evening, in relation to conception rates, and recommendations of what time in the day to take the test varies between manufacturers and healthcare workers. Tests may be read manually using a color-change paper strip, or digitally with the assistance of reading electronics.

Tests for luteinizing hormone may be combined with testing for estradiol in tests such as the Clearblue fertility monitor.

The sensitivity of LH tests are measured in milli international unit, with tests commonly available in the range 10–40 m.i.u. (the lower the number, the higher the sensitivity).

As sperm can stay viable in the woman for several days, LH tests are not recommended for contraceptive practices, as the LH surge typically occurs after the beginning of the fertile window.

== Disease states ==
=== Excess ===
In children with precocious puberty of pituitary or central origin, LH and FSH levels may be in the reproductive range instead of the low levels typical for their age.

During the reproductive years, relatively elevated LH is frequently seen in patients with polyendocrine metabolic ovarian syndrome; however, it would be unusual for them to have LH levels outside of the normal reproductive range.

Persistently high LH levels are indicative of situations where the normal restricting feedback from the gonad is absent, leading to a pituitary production of both LH and FSH. While this is typical in menopause, it is abnormal in the reproductive years. There it may be a sign of:

1. Premature menopause
2. Gonadal dysgenesis, Turner syndrome, Klinefelter syndrome
3. Castration
4. Swyer syndrome
5. Polyendocrine metabolic ovarian syndrome
6. Certain forms of congenital adrenal hyperplasia
7. Testicular failure
8. Pregnancy – BetaHCG can mimic LH so tests may show elevated LH

Note: A medical drug for inhibiting luteinizing hormone secretion is butinazocine.

=== Deficiency ===
Diminished secretion of LH can result in failure of gonadal function (hypogonadism). This condition is typically manifest in males as failure in production of normal numbers of sperm. In females, amenorrhea is commonly observed. Conditions with very low LH secretions include:

1. Pasqualini syndrome
2. Kallmann syndrome
3. Hypothalamic suppression
4. Hypopituitarism
5. Eating disorder
6. Female athlete triad
7. Hyperprolactinemia
8. Hypogonadism
9. Gonadal suppression therapy
  1. GnRH antagonist
  2. GnRH agonist (inducing an initial stimulation (flare up) followed by permanent blockage of the GnRH pituitary receptor)

== As a medication ==
Luteinizing hormone INN: lutropin alfa
Clinical data
- ATC code: G03GA07 (WHO)

Legal status
- Legal status: EU: Rx-only

Identifiers
- CAS Number: 152923-57-4
- UNII: 3JGY52XJNA
- ECHA InfoCard: 100.029.680

Luteinizing hormone is available mixed with FSH in the form of menotropin, and other forms of urinary gonadotropins. More purified forms of urinary gonadotropins may reduce the LH portion in relation to FSH. Recombinant luteinizing hormone is available as lutropin alfa (Luveris).

== Role in phosphorylation ==
Phosphorylation is a biochemical process that involves the addition of phosphate to an organic compound. Steroidogenesis entails processes by which cholesterol is converted to biologically active steroid hormones. A study shows that LH via a PKA signaling pathway regulates the phosphorylation and localization of DRP1 within mitochondria of the steroidogenic cells of the ovary.
