= Falsifiability =

Property of a statement that can be logically contradicted

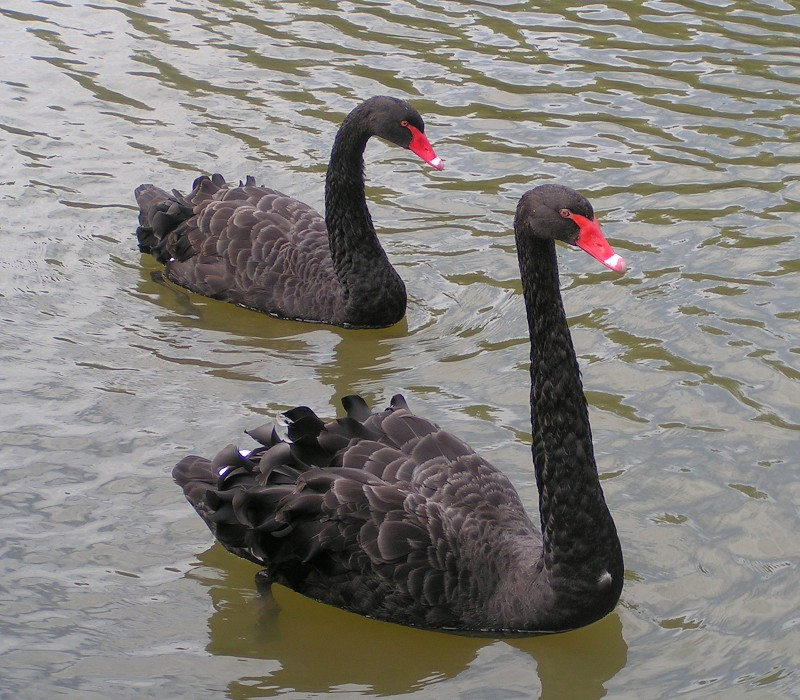
Here are two black swans, but even with no black swans, "All swans are white" would still be shown falsifiable by "Here is a black swan"—it would still be a valid observation statement in the empirical language, even if empirically false.

Falsifiability is a standard of evaluation of scientific statements, including theories and hypotheses. A statement is falsifiable if it belongs to a language or logical structure capable of describing an empirical observation that contradicts it.

In the case of a theory, falsifiability requires that, given an initial condition, the theory must theoretically exclude some observations, that is, it must make formal predictions. It was introduced by the philosopher of science Karl Popper in his book The Logic of Scientific Discovery (1934). (Note: Popper wanted the main text of the 1959 English version, The Logic of Scientific Discovery, to conform to the original and therefore refused to make substantial corrections, but only added notes and appendices and marked them with an asterisk. See Popper 2002, Translators' note) Popper emphasized that the contradiction is to be found in the logical structure alone, without having to worry about methodological considerations external to this structure. He proposed falsifiability as the cornerstone solution to both the problem of induction and the problem of demarcation.

Popper also emphasized the related asymmetry created by the relation of a universal law with basic observation statements and contrasted falsifiability with the intuitively similar concept of verifiability that was then current in the philosophical discipline of logical positivism. He argued that the only way to verify a claim such as "All swans are white" would be if one could empirically observe all swans, which is not pragmatically possible. On the other hand, the observation of a single black swan is enough to refute this claim.

This asymmetry can only be seen rigorously when methodological falsification issues are put aside. Otherwise, a stated observation of one or even more black swans constitutes at best a problematic refutation of the claim. Accordingly, to be rigorous, falsifiability is a logical criterion within an empirical language that is accepted by convention and allows these methodological considerations to be avoided. Only then are the asymmetry and falsifiability rigorous. Popper argued that it should not be conflated with falsificationism, which is a methodological approach where scientists actively try to find evidence to disprove theories. Falsifiability is distinct from Lakatos' falsificationism. Its purpose is to make theory predictive, testable and useful in practice.

By contrast, the Duhem–Quine thesis says that definitive experimental falsifications are impossible and that no scientific hypothesis is by itself capable of making predictions, because an empirical test of the hypothesis requires background assumptions, which acceptations are methodological decisions in Lakatos' falsificationism.

Popper's response was that falsifiability is a logical criterion. Experimental research has the Duhem problem and other problems, such as the problem of induction, but, according to Popper, logical induction is a fallacy and statistical tests, which are possible only when a theory is falsifiable, are useful within a critical discussion.

Popper's distinction between logic and methodology has not allowed falsifiability to escape some criticisms aimed at methodology. For example, Popper's rejection of Marxism as unscientific because of its resistance to negative evidence is a methodological position, but the problems with this position are nevertheless presented as a limitation of falsifiability. Others, despite the unsuccessful proposals of Russell, the Vienna Circle, Lakatos, and others to establish a rigorous way of justifying scientific theories or research programs and thus demarcating them from non-science and pseudoscience, criticize falsifiability for not following a similar proposal and for supporting instead only a methodology based on critical discussion.

As a key notion in the separation of science from non-science and pseudoscience, falsifiability has featured prominently in many controversies and applications, used as legal precedent.

== Induction and demarcation ==
One concern about the scientific method is how to move from observations to scientific laws. This is the problem of induction. Considering the hypothesis that all swans are white, given an observation of a white swan, there is no logical path from "here is a white swan" to "all swans are white"; doing so would involve a logical fallacy such as, for example, affirming the consequent.

Popper's idea to solve this problem was that while it is impossible to verify that every swan is white, finding a single black swan shows that not every swan is white. Such falsification uses the valid inference modus tollens: if, from a law $L$, $Q$ can be logically deduced, but $\neg Q$ is observed, $L$ is false. Thus, given $L =$ "all swans are white", $Q =$ "the specific swan here is white", but if what is observed is $\neg Q =$ "the observed swan is not white", then "all swans are white" is false. More precisely, the deducible statement $Q$ can be broken into an initial condition and a prediction as in $C \Rightarrow P$ in which $C =$ "the thing here is a swan" and $P =$ "the thing here is a white swan". If what is observed is C being true while P is false (formally, $C \wedge \neg P$), the law is false by modus tollens.

Popper claimed that induction is not needed in science, that is, he rejected that we learn by the repetition of observations and considered that logical induction was a fallacy. Instead, laws are conjectured in a non-logical manner on the basis of expectations and predispositions and trials continue as long as there are problems. This led Popper's student and collaborator David Miller to write "the mission is to classify truths, not to certify them". In contrast, the logical empiricism movement, led by philosophers such as Moritz Schlick, Rudolf Carnap, Otto Neurath, and A. J. Ayer, wanted to formalize the idea that, for a law to be scientific, it must be possible to argue on the basis of observations in favor of its truth or falsity. No consensus emerged about how to achieve that, but the thought expressed by Mach's dictum that "where neither confirmation nor refutation is possible, science is not concerned" was accepted as a scientific precept.

Popper said that a demarcation criterion for the laws of science was possible, but that what matters is the logical possibility of falsification of these laws, which is falsifiability. He cited his encounter with psychoanalysis in the 1910s, especially with Alfred Adler. It did not matter what observation was presented, psychoanalysis could explain it. The reason it could explain everything is that it did not exclude anything. Popper claimed that this was a failure, because it meant that the criterion could not lead to a prediction. From a logical standpoint, observations that do not contradict a law does not mean that the law is true. A verification has no value in itself. But, if a hypothesis makes risky predictions and these are corroborated, Popper stated, that was a reason to prefer this hypothesis over others that makes less risky predictions or no predictions at all. In the definition of falsifiability, contradictions with observations are not used to support falsifications, but for logical "falsifications" that show that the law makes risky predictions.

Popper said that some philosophers of the Vienna Circle had conflated two problems, that of meaning and that of demarcation, and had proposed in verificationism a single solution to both: a statement that could not be verified was considered meaningless. Popper instead said that meaningful non-scientific theories exist, and that, accordingly, a criterion of meaningfulness does not coincide with a criterion of demarcation.

=== Hume's problem ===
The problem of induction is often called Hume's problem. David Hume studied how human beings obtain new knowledge that goes beyond known laws and observations, including how to discover new laws. He understood that deductive logic could not explain this learning process and argued in favour of a mental or psychological process of learning that would not require deductive logic. He argued that this learning process cannot be justified by any general rules, deductive or not. Popper accepted Hume's argument and therefore viewed progress in science as the result of quasi-induction, which is induction without inference rules and which he also called the "path of science".

Philip N. Johnson-Laird agreed with Hume that no general method of justification for induction is possible but that induction does not require justification. Instead, these steps use patterns of induction, which are not expected to have a general justification: they may or may not be applicable depending on context.

[P]hilosophers have worried about which properties of objects warrant inductive inferences. The answer rests on knowledge: we don't infer that all the passengers on a plane are male because the first ten off the plane are men. We know that this observation doesn't rule out the possibility of a woman passenger.

Johnson-Laird's view was that "induction is just something that animals, including human beings, do to make life possible".

Popper accepted the possibility of a psychological explanation for the learning process, especially when psychology is seen as an extension of biology, but claimed that biological explanations were not within the scope of epistemology. In line with Johnson-Laird's view, Popper proposed an evolutionary mechanism to explain science's success, but he did not consider it part of his epistemology. He referred to this as psychologism. He wrote that his interest was mainly in the logic of science and that epistemology should be concerned with logical aspects only. Instead of asking why science succeeds, he considered induction pragmatically. He asked what methodology should be used to accept one among multiple hypotheses. He proposed that it be the one that was the most tested: "the one, which in the light of our critical discussion, appears to be the best so far". By his own account, because only a negative approach was supported by logic, Popper adopted a negative methodology to prevent the "policy of immunizing our theories against refutation". It also supported a "dogmatic attitude" in defending theories against criticism, because this would allow the process to be more complete. This view was much criticized.

=== A different notion of induction ===
In practice, some steps based on observations can be justified under assumptions. For example, Bayesian inductive logic is justified by theorems that make explicit assumptions. These theorems are obtained with deductive logic. They are sometimes presented as supporting steps of induction, because they refer to laws of probability, even though they do not extend beyond deductive logic. This is a different notion of induction, which overlaps with deductive logic in the sense of being supported by it. Hume's argument does not reject the possibility of a general procedure that relies on hypotheses to explain the progress of science, but it says the problem of how to choose the initial hypotheses and prove their validity creates an infinite regress.

== Logic of science versus applied methodology ==
Popper distinguished the logic of science from its applied methodology. For example, the falsifiability of Newton's law of gravitation, as defined by Popper, depends purely on the logical relation it has with a statement such as "The brick fell upwards when released". A brick that falls upwards would not alone falsify Newton's law of gravitation. The capacity to verify the absence of conditions such as a hidden string attached to the brick is also needed for this state of affairs to eventually falsify Newton's law of gravitation. However, these applied methodological considerations are irrelevant in falsifiability, because it is a logical criterion. The empirical requirement on the potential falsifier, also called the material requirement, is only that it is communicable inter-subjectively. The potential falsifier is not required to actually show the law to be false. The purely logical contradiction, together with the material requirement, are sufficient. The logical part consists of theories, statements, and their logical relationship together with this material requirement, which is needed for a connection with the methodological part.

The methodological part consists, in Popper's view, of informal rules, which are used to formulate hypotheses, accept observations as factual, etc. These include statistical tests: Popper is aware that observation statements are accepted with the help of statistical methods and that these involve methodological decisions. When this distinction is applied to the term "falsifiability", it corresponds to a distinction between two different meanings of the term. The same is true for the term "falsifiable". Popper said that he only uses "falsifiability" or "falsifiable" in reference to the logical side and that, when he refers to the methodological side, he speaks instead of "falsification" and its problems.

Popper said that methodological problems require methodology rules. One such rule is that, refusing to go along with falsifications is equivalent to retiring from science. The logical side has no such methodological problems, in particular with regard to the falsifiability of a theory, because basic statements are not required to be possible. Methodological rules are only needed in the context of actual falsifications.

So observations have two purposes. On the methodological side, observations can show that a law is false. On the logical side, observations, which are purely logical constructions, contradict a law to show its falsifiability. Unlike falsifications and free from the problems of falsification, these contradictions establish the value of the law, which may eventually be corroborated.

Popper wrote that an entire literature exists because this distinction between the logical and the methodological was not observed. This survives in later literature. For example, in their 2019 article "Evidence based medicine as science", Vere and Gibson wrote "[falsifiability has] been considered problematic because theories are not simply tested through falsification but in conjunction with auxiliary assumptions and background knowledge."

According to Thornton, Popper's distinction between logic and methodology did not allow falsifiability, even when presented as a logical criterion, to escape criticism aimed at methodology. For example, the dismissal of Marxism as unscientific because it was not abandoned despite the evidence was a methodological position adopted by Popper, and problems with this position have been presented by Lakatos and others as a limitation of his criterion of demarcation.

=== Practical value of a logical criterion ===
The fact that science must be based on empirical evidence does not mean that a logical criterion fails to address the real concerns of science. As explained by Thornton, there is no methodological falsifications in the process of science except in those tests that compare the theory with factual observations, but in these tests too the procedure is mostly logical and involves observations that are only logical constructions. Popper distinguishes four different lines along which the testing of a theory could be carried out. First there is the logical comparison of deduced statements by which the internal consistency of the system is tested. Second, there is the determination whether it has the character of an empirical or scientific theory, or whether it is, for example, tautological, as required by the falsifiability criterion. Third, there is the comparison with other theories to determine whether the theory would constitute a scientific advance if not empirically rejected. Finally and most importantly, there is the testing of the theory by way of empirical applications of the conclusions which can be derived from it, which would not be possible without falsifiability. Here, too, the testing procedure turns out to require deductive logic, essentially because it is needed to properly conceive, implement, and interpret observations. The logical aspect of the criterion makes it practical, because it goes along the usual activities in science.

== Basic statements ==
In Popper's view, observation statements can be analyzed within a logical structure independent of factual observations. The set of all purely logical observations that are considered constitutes the empirical basis. Popper calls them the basic statements or test statements. They can be used to show the falsifiability of a theory. Popper says that basic statements do not have to be possible. It is sufficient that they are accepted by convention as belonging to the empirical language, a language that "must be testable by intersubjective observation (the material requirement)".

When there is a technological advance, a technology that was previously only hypothetical, for example, the use of a rocket to examine the hidden surface of the moon, might become available with all the details known. This has led Herbert Keuth to write: "a hypotheses that was first untestable may become testable later on." Formally, though, one might counter argue that it's not the same theory, because the basic statements are interpreted slightly differently with the actual details.

In The Logic of Scientific Discovery, Popper discusses informally which statements among those that are considered in the logical structure are basic statements. A logical structure uses universal classes to define laws. For example, in the law "all swans are white" the concept of swans is a universal class. It corresponds to a set of properties that every swan must have. It is not restricted to the swans that exist, existed or will exist. Informally, a basic statement is simply a statement that concerns only a finite number of specific instances in universal classes. In particular, an existential statement such as "there exists a black swan" is not a basic statement, because it is not specific about the instance. On the other hand, "this swan here is black" is a basic statement. Popper says that it is a singular existential statement or simply a singular statement. So, basic statements are singular (existential) statements.

== Definition of falsifiability ==
Thornton says that basic statements correspond to particular "observation-reports". He then gives Popper's definition of falsifiability:

A theory is scientific if and only if it divides the class of basic statements into the following two non-empty sub-classes: (a) the class of all those basic statements with which it is inconsistent, or which it prohibits—this is the class of its potential falsifiers (i.e., those statements which, if true, falsify the whole theory), and (b) the class of those basic statements with which it is consistent, or which it permits (i.e., those statements which, if true, corroborate it, or bear it out).

As in the case of actual falsifiers, decisions must be taken by scientists to accept a logical structure and its associated empirical basis, but these are usually part of a background knowledge that scientists have in common and, often, discussion is not necessary. The first decision described by Lakatos is implicit in this agreement, but the other decisions are not needed. The agreement exists only in principle. This is where the logical/methodological distinction becomes important. When an actual falsifier is proposed, the technology used is considered in detail and an actual agreement is needed. This may require using a deeper empirical basis, to make sure that the properties or values used in the falsifier were obtained correctly.

Popper says that despite the fact that the empirical basis can be shaky, the above definition is simply the formalization of a natural requirement on scientific theories, without which the whole logical process of science would not be possible.

=== Initial condition and prediction in falsifiers of laws ===
In his analysis of universal laws, Popper conclusion was that laws must "allow us to deduce, roughly speaking, more empirical singular statements than we can deduce from the initial conditions alone." A singular statement that has only one part cannot contradict a universal law. To contradict a universal law, a falsifier must have two parts: the initial condition and the singular statement that contradicts the prediction as in $C \Rightarrow P$ in which $C =$ "the thing here is a swan" and $P =$ "the thing here is a white swan".

However, falsifiers need not have two parts in the definition itself. In this way, the definition is more general and allows basic statements to be falsifiable. For example, "the thing here is a black swan" is falsifiable, because it is contradicted by the falsifier "the thing here is a white swan". Popper wrote that criteria that require that a law must be predictive, just as is required by falsifiability when applied to laws, "have been put forward as criteria of the meaningfulness of sentences (rather than as criteria of demarcation applicable to theoretical systems) again and again after the publication of my book, even by critics who pooh-poohed my criterion of falsifiability."

=== Necessity to strengthen laws to make them falsifiable ===
Grover Maxwell discussed statements such as "All men are mortal." This is not falsifiable, because it does not matter how old a man is, he might die next year. Maxwell said that this statement is nevertheless useful, because it is often corroborated. He coined the term "corroboration without demarcation". Popper's view is that it is indeed useful, because he considers that metaphysical statements can be useful, but also because it is indirectly corroborated by its agreement with the falsifiable law "All men die before the age of 150." For Popper, if no such falsifiable law exists, then the metaphysical law is less useful, because it is not indirectly corroborated by a stronger law, a law that prohibits more. This kind of non-falsifiable statements in science was noticed by Carnap as early as 1937.

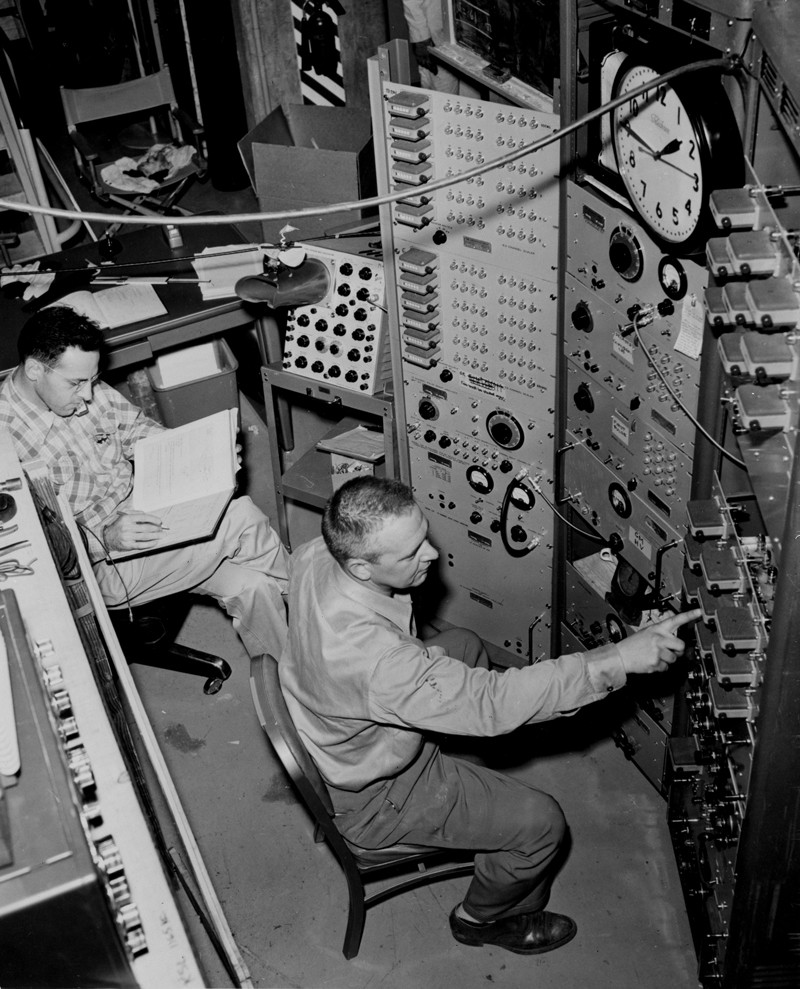
Clyde Cowan conducting the neutrino experiment (1956)

Maxwell also used the example "All solids have a melting point." This is not falsifiable, because maybe the melting point will be reached at a higher temperature. The law is falsifiable and more useful if we specify an upper bound on melting points or a way to calculate this upper bound.

Another example from Maxwell is "All beta decays are accompanied with a neutrino emission from the same nucleus." This is also not falsifiable, because maybe the neutrino can be detected in a different manner. The law is falsifiable and much more useful from a scientific point of view, if the method to detect the neutrino is specified. Maxwell said that most scientific laws are metaphysical statements of this kind, which, Popper said, need to be made more precise before they can be indirectly corroborated. In other words, specific technologies must be provided to make the statements inter-subjectively-verifiable, i.e., so that scientists know what the falsification or its failure actually means.

In his critique of the falsifiability criterion, Maxwell considered the requirement for decisions in the falsification of both the emission of neutrinos and the existence of the melting point. For example, he pointed out that had no neutrino been detected, it could have been because some conservation law is false. Popper did not argue against the problems of falsification per se. He always acknowledged these problems. His response was at the logical level. For example, he pointed out that, if a specific way is given to trap the neutrino, then, at the level of the language, the statement is falsifiable, because "no neutrino was detected after using this specific way" formally contradicts it (and it is inter-subjectively-verifiable—people can repeat the experiment).

=== Falsifiability in model theory ===
Herbert A. Simon studied the semantic aspects of falsifiability. There it is proposed that two formal requirements govern a formally defined and stringent falsifiability that a theory must satisfy to qualify as scientific: that they be finitely and irrevocably testable. These studies were done in the perspective that a logic is a relation between formal sentences in languages and a collection of mathematical structures, each of which is considered a model within model theory. The relation, usually denoted ${\mathfrak A} \models \phi$, says the formal sentence $\phi$ is true when interpreted in the structure ${\mathfrak A}$—it provides the semantic of the languages. (Note: This perspective can be found in any text on model theory. For example, see Ebbinghaus 2017.) According to Rynasiewicz, in this semantic perspective, Popperian falsifiability means that in some observation structure (in the collection) there exists a set of observations which refutes the theory.

A stronger notion of falsifiability was considered, which requires that all structures in the collection that cannot be expanded to a structure that satisfies $\phi$ contain such a contradicting set of observations. This stronger definition makes sense, because it says that we want a falsifier whenever the theory is actually false. It also implies other interesting properties, but it is not the usual falsifiability. For example, « all swans are white and there exists a white raven » is falsifiable in the usual sense, but not strongly falsifiable, because in the case where all swans are white and all ravens are black we cannot find a falsifier. The fact that all ravens are black contradicts the theory, but it is not a singular statement, not a possible observation.

== Examples ==
=== Newton's theory ===
Lakatos suggested that Isaac Newton's law of universal gravitation was as difficult to show to be falsifiable as Sigmund Freud's theory of psychoanalysis. To refute this, Popper gave the example of an apple that moves from the ground up to a branch and then starts to dance from branch to branch. According to Popper's definition, this is a basic statement and a potential falsifier for Newton's theory, because the position of the apple at different times can be measured. This appears controversial, because Newtonian physics does not deny that forces stronger than Earth's gravity can act on the apple. However, the definition of falsifiability only asserts the well-established fact that Newton's law is predictive, that is, it prohibits certain states of affairs. To this end, it restricts itself to what the law formally says about the basic statements, just as when theoretical physicists compute the direction of a rocket and ignore all methodological considerations that are not a part of the initial conditions that they decided to consider, including unexpected extra forces. It is possible that some unexpected phenomena invalidate their prediction, but that does not concern falsifiability. Methodological considerations have been known since at least Duhem to imply the impossibility of predictions, but falsifiability is a logical criterion.

=== Equivalence principle ===
Another example of a basic statement is "The inert mass of this object is ten times larger than its gravitational mass." This is a basic statement because the inert mass and the gravitational mass can both be measured separately, even though it never happens that they are different. It is, as described by Popper, a valid falsifier for the equivalence principle, a concept associated with Albert Einstein.

=== Evolution ===
==== Industrial melanism ====
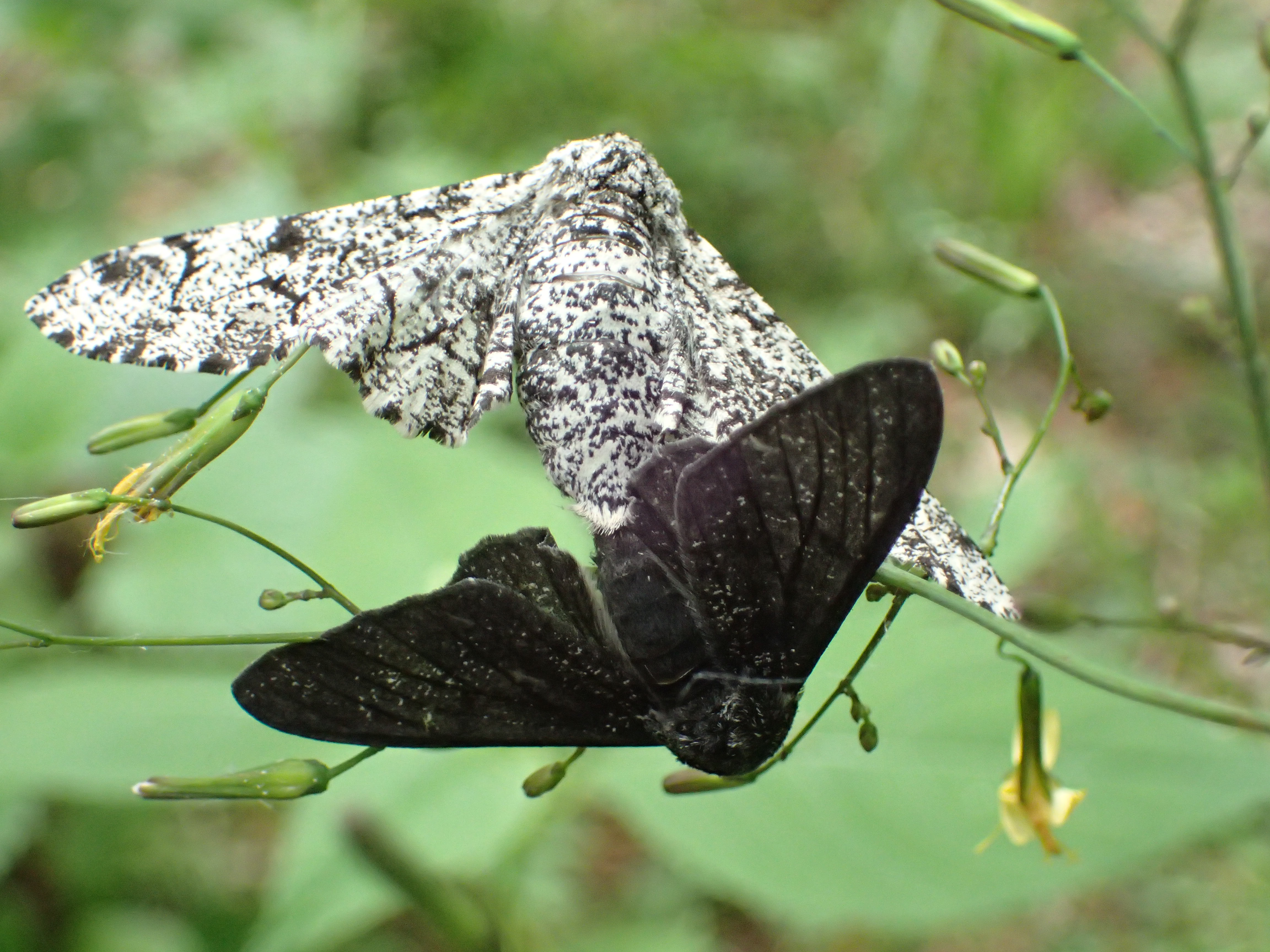
A black-bodied and white-bodied peppered moth

In a discussion of the theory of evolution, Popper mentioned industrial melanism as an example of a falsifiable law. A corresponding basic statement that acts as a potential falsifier is "In this industrial area, the relative fitness of the white-bodied peppered moth is high." Here "fitness" means "reproductive success over the next generation". It is a basic statement, because it is possible to separately determine the kind of environment, industrial vs natural, and the relative fitness of the white-bodied form (relative to the black-bodied form) in an area, even though it never happens that the white-bodied form has a high relative fitness in an industrial area.

==== Precambrian rabbit ====
A famous example of a basic statement from J. B. S. Haldane is "[These are] fossil rabbits in the Precambrian era." This is a basic statement because it is possible to find a fossil rabbit and to determine that the date of a fossil is in the Precambrian era, even though it never happens that the date of a rabbit fossil is in the Precambrian era. This shows the scientific character of paleontology, because it contradicts the hypothesis in paleontology that all mammals existed in a much more recent era, despite opinions to the contrary. Richard Dawkins adds that any other modern animal, such as a hippo, would suffice.

=== Unfalsifiable statements ===
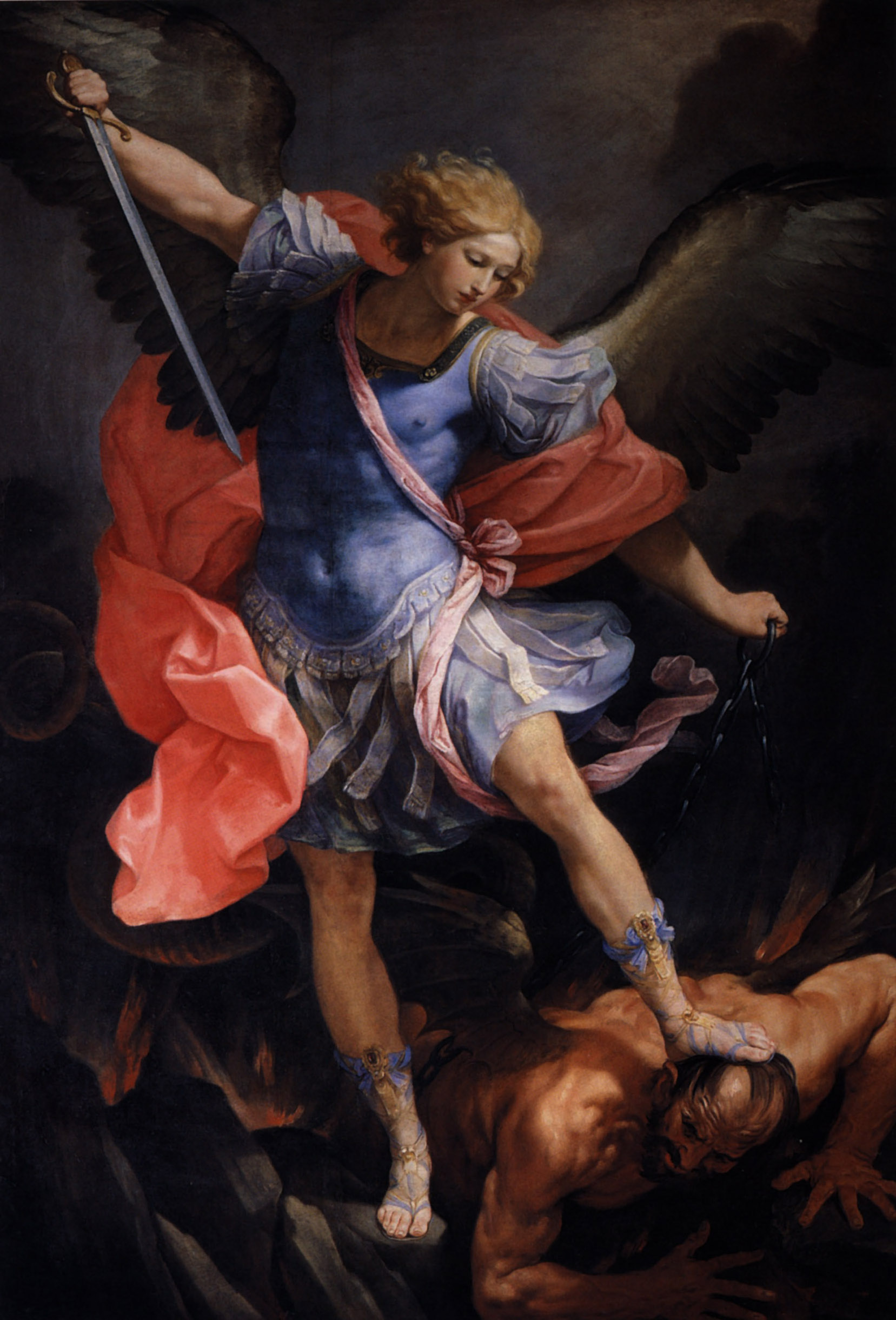
Even if it is accepted that angels exist, "All angels have large wings" is not falsifiable, because no technology exists to identify and observe angels.

A simple example of a non-basic statement is "This angel does not have large wings." It is not a basic statement, because though the absence of large wings can be observed, no technology (independent of the presence of wings) exists to identify angels. Even if it is accepted that angels exist, the sentence "All angels have large wings" is not falsifiable.

Another example from Popper of a non-basic statement is "This human action is altruistic." It is not a basic statement, because no accepted technology allows us to determine whether or not an action is motivated by self-interest. Because no basic statement falsifies it, the statement that "All human actions are egotistic, motivated by self-interest" is thus not falsifiable.

=== Omphalos hypothesis ===
Some adherents of young-Earth creationism make an argument (called the Omphalos hypothesis after the Greek word for navel) that the world was created with the appearance of age; e.g., the sudden appearance of a mature chicken capable of laying eggs. This ad hoc hypothesis introduced into young-Earth creationism is unfalsifiable because it says that the time of creation (of a species) measured by the accepted technology is illusory and no accepted technology is proposed to measure the claimed "actual" time of creation. Moreover, if the ad hoc hypothesis says that the world was created as we observe it today without stating further laws, by definition it cannot be contradicted by observations and thus is not falsifiable. This is discussed by Dienes in the case of a variation on the Omphalos hypothesis, which, in addition, specifies that God made the creation in this way to test our faith.

=== Natural selection ===
In the 5th and 6th editions of On the Origin of Species, following a suggestion of Alfred Russel Wallace, Darwin used "Survival of the fittest", an expression first coined by Herbert Spencer, as a synonym for Natural Selection. Popper and others said that the most widely accepted definition of "fitness" in modern biology, namely reproductive success, the expression "survival of the fittest" is a tautology.

Darwinist Ronald Fisher used mathematical theorems to provide explanations for natural selection. Popper and others did not accept these, saying that no falsifiable law of natural selection had been offered, because these tools apply only to certain rare traits. Popper instead asserts that the work of Fisher and others on natural selection is part of an important and successful metaphysical research program.

=== Mathematics ===
Popper said that some unfalsifiable statements may be useful to science. Mathematical statements are good examples. Like all formal sciences, mathematics is not concerned with the validity of theories based on observations in the empirical world, but rather, mathematics is the study of abstract topics such as quantity, structure, space and change. Mathematical methods are, however, applied in constructing and testing models dealing with observable reality. Albert Einstein wrote, "One reason why mathematics enjoys special esteem, above all other sciences, is that its laws are absolutely certain and indisputable, while those of other sciences are to some extent debatable and in constant danger of being overthrown by newly discovered facts."

=== Historicism ===
Popper distinguished the original theory of Marx and what came to be known as Marxism. He claimed that the original theory contained genuine scientific laws. Though they could not make preordained predictions, these laws constrained how changes occur in society. One of them was that changes cannot "be achieved by the use of legal or political means". In Popper's view, this was both testable and subsequently falsified. "Yet instead of accepting the refutations", Popper wrote, "the followers of Marx re-interpreted both the theory and the evidence in order to make them agree. ... They thus gave a 'conventionalist twist' to the theory; and by this stratagem, they destroyed its much advertised claim to scientific status." Popper's attacks were not directed toward Marxism, or Marx's theories, which were falsifiable, but toward Marxists who he considered to have ignored the falsifications which had happened. Popper more fundamentally criticized 'historicism' in the sense of any preordained prediction of history, given what he saw as human's right, ability and responsibility to control its destiny.

== Courts of law ==
Falsifiability was used in the McLean v. Arkansas case (in 1982), the Daubert case (in 1993) and other cases. A survey of 303 federal judges conducted in 1998 (Note: Surveys were mailed to all active U.S. district court judges in November 1998 (N = 619). 303 usable surveys were obtained for a response rate of 51%. See Krafka 2002, p. 9 in archived pdf.) found that "[P]roblems with the nonfalsifiable nature of an expert's underlying theory and difficulties with an unknown or too-large error rate were cited in less than 2% of cases."

=== McLean v. Arkansas case ===
In the McLean v. Arkansas case, Judge William Overton used falsifiability as a criterion to determine that "creation science" was not scientific and should not be taught in Arkansas public schools as such (it can be taught as religion). In his testimony, philosopher Michael Ruse defined the characteristics which constitute science as:

- It is guided by natural law;
- It has to be explanatory by reference to natural law;
- It is testable against the empirical world;
- Its conclusions are tentative, i.e., are not necessarily the final word; and
- It is falsifiable.

In his conclusion related to this criterion Judge Overton stated:

While anybody is free to approach a scientific inquiry in any fashion they choose, they cannot properly describe the methodology as scientific, if they start with the conclusion and refuse to change it regardless of the evidence developed during the course of the investigation.

— William Overton

=== Daubert standard ===
In several cases, the United States Supreme Court described scientific methodology using the five Daubert factors, which include falsifiability. (Note: The Daubert case and subsequent cases that used it as a reference, including General Electric Co. v. Joiner and Kumho Tire Co. v. Carmichael, resulted in an amendment of the Federal Rules of Evidence). The Kumho Tire Co. v. Carmichael case and other cases considered the original Daubert factors, but the amended rule, rule 702, even though it is often referred to as the ''Daubert'' standard, does not include the original Daubert factors or mention falsifiability or testability and neither does the majority opinion delivered by William Rehnquist in the General Electric Co. v. Joiner case.) The Daubert case cited Popper and other philosophers of science:

Ordinarily, a key question to be answered in determining whether a theory or technique is scientific knowledge that will assist the trier of fact will be whether it can be (and has been) tested. Scientific methodology today is based on generating hypotheses and testing them to see if they can be falsified; indeed, this methodology is what distinguishes science from other fields of human inquiry. Green 645. See also Carl Hempel, Philosophy of Natural Science 49 (1966) ([T]he statements constituting a scientific explanation must be capable of empirical test); Karl Popper, Conjectures and Refutations: The Growth of Scientific Knowledge 37 (5th ed. 1989) ([T]he criterion of the scientific status of a theory is its falsifiability, or refutability, or testability) (emphasis deleted).

— Harry Blackmun

David H. Kaye (Note: Not to be confused with David Kaye (law professor), United Nations special rapporteur. David H. Kaye is distinguished professor of law at Penn State Law.) said that references to the Daubert majority opinion confused falsifiability and falsification and that "inquiring into the existence of meaningful attempts at falsification is an appropriate and crucial consideration in admissibility determinations."

== Statistical theories and falsifiability ==
Considering the specific detection procedure that was used in the neutrino experiment, without mentioning its probabilistic aspect, Popper wrote, "it provided a test of the much more significant falsifiable theory that such emitted neutrinos could be trapped in a certain way". Popper was not concerned with the probabilistic aspect of the experiment. Together with Maxwell, who raised the problems of falsification, he was aware that some convention must be adopted to fix what it means to detect or not detect a neutrino. This is Lakatos' third kind of decision. For Popper and most philosophers, some theory underpins observations. The theory that justifies that we conventionally accept the potential falsifier "no neutrino was detected" is statistical. In statistical language, the potential falsifier that can be not rejected statistically is typically the null hypothesis, as understood even in popular accounts on falsifiability.

Statisticians use various techniques to draw conclusions about hypotheses on the basis of available evidence. Fisher, Neyman, and Pearson proposed approaches that require no prior probabilities. In contrast, Bayesian inference emphasizes the importance of prior probabilities. Any approach that provides a way to accept or reject a potential falsifier can be used, including Bayes' theorem and estimates of prior probabilities that are made using critical discussions and reasonable assumptions taken from background knowledge. No general rule considers a hypothesis with small Bayesian revised probability to be falsified, because the individual outcomes described will have small probabilities under available evidence without qualifying as genuine anomalies (Mayo and Popper). Nevertheless, Mayo added, "they can indirectly falsify hypotheses by adding a methodological falsification rule". In general, Bayesian statistics can play a role in the context of inductive logic, which is said to be inductive because implications are generalized to conditional probabilities. According to Popper and others such as Colin Howson, Hume's argument precludes inductive logic, but only when the logic makes no use "of additional assumptions: in particular, about what is to be assigned positive prior probability". Inductive logic is not precluded, especially not when it is a deductively valid application of Bayes' theorem that is used to evaluate the probability of the hypotheses using the observed data and what is assumed about the priors. Gelman and Shalizi mentioned that Bayes' statisticians do not have to disagree with the non-inductivists.

Because statisticians often associate statistical inference with induction, Popper's philosophy is often said to have a hidden form of induction. Mayo wrote "The falsifying hypotheses ... necessitate an evidence-transcending (inductive) statistical inference. This is hugely problematic for Popper". Yet, also according to Mayo, Popper [as a non-inductivist] acknowledged the useful role of statistical inference in the falsification problems: she mentioned that when Popper wrote her "I regret not studying statistics", her thought was "not as much as I do".

== Lakatos's falsificationism ==
Imre Lakatos divided the problems of falsification into two categories. The first corresponds to decisions that must be agreed upon by scientists before they can falsify a theory. The other is the use of falsifications and corroborations to explain progress in science. Lakatos described four kinds of falsificationisms:

- Dogmatic falsificationism – ignores both types of problems.
- Methodological falsificationism – addresses the first type of problem by accepting that decisions must be taken by scientists.
- Naive methodological falsificationism or naive falsificationism – does not do anything to address the second type of problems.
- Sophisticated falsificationism – attempts to address both problems.

Lakatos used dogmatic and naive falsificationism to describe how Popper changed over time and viewed sophisticated falsificationism as his refinement, but also said that Popper sometimes presents as a sophisticated falsificationist. Popper responded that Lakatos was misrepresenting his intellectual history.

=== Dogmatic falsificationism ===
A dogmatic falsificationist rejects that every observation is theory-impregnated, which means that it goes beyond direct experience. For example, the statement "Here is a glass of water" goes beyond experience, because the concepts of glass and water "denote physical bodies which exhibit a certain law-like behaviour" (Popper). This leads to the critique that it is unclear which theory is falsified: the one under study or the one behind the observation. This is sometimes called the 'Duhem–Quine problem'.

An example is Galileo's refutation of the theory that celestial bodies are faultless crystal balls. Many claimed that the optical theory of the telescope was false, not the reigning theory of celestial bodies. Another example is the theory that neutrinos are emitted in beta decays. Had they not been observed in the Cowan–Reines neutrino experiment, many would have considered that the strength of the beta-inverse reaction used to detect the neutrinos was not sufficiently high. At the time, Grover Maxwell wrote that the possibility that this strength was sufficiently high was a "pious hope".

A dogmatic falsificationist ignores the role of auxiliary hypotheses. The assumptions or auxiliary hypotheses of a particular test are all the hypotheses that must be correct in order for the test to perform as expected. The predicted observation that is contradicted depends on the theory and these auxiliary hypotheses. Therefore, whether it is the theory or an auxiliary hypothesis that is falsified by the observation is undetermined. Lakatos gives the example of the path of a planet. If the path contradicts Newton's law, it is not clear what should be rejected: Newton's law or the hypothesis that no other body influenced the path. A dogmatic falsificationist would ignore that and consider that Newton's law is falsified.

Lakatos says that Popper's solution to these criticisms of the dogmatic falsificationist requires relaxing the assumption that an observation can show a theory to be false:

If a theory is falsified [in the usual sense], it is proven false; if it is 'falsified' [in the technical sense], it may still be true.

— Imre Lakatos

Popper's solution, in his own words, is to distinguish between states of affairs as logical falsifications and actual methodological falsifications. Popper never relaxed the notion that logical falsifications show that a theory is falsifiable. He always accepted the existence of methodological problems. He always maintained that actual falsifications are not possible. He wrote that one should nor read Lakatos to understand his intellectual history.

=== Methodological falsificationism ===
Methodological falsificationism replaces the usual notion of contradicting observation in a falsification with a new notion of 'contradicting observation' (now in quotes), a convention that requires four kinds of decisions with accompanying goals:

- selecting all basic statements (statements that correspond to logically possible observations),
- selecting the accepted basic statements among those basic statements,
- making statistical laws falsifiable and
- applying the refutation to the specific theory (instead of an auxiliary hypothesis).

The experimental falsifiers and falsifications thus depend on decisions in view of accepted technology and associated theory. A fifth decision is mentioned by Lakatos to allow even more theories to be falsified.

=== Naive falsificationism ===
According to Lakatos, naive falsificationism is the claim that methodological falsifications can by themselves explain scientific progress. Very often a theory is still useful and used even after it is found in contradiction with some observations. Also, when scientists deal with two or more competing theories which are both corroborated, considering only falsifications, it is not clear why one theory is chosen above the other, even when one is corroborated more often than the other. In fact, a stronger version of the Quine-Duhem thesis says that it is not always possible to rationally pick one theory over another using falsifications. Considering only falsifications, it is not clear why a corroborating experiment should be seen as progress. Lakatos described Popper as being in part a naive falsificationist and in part a sophisticated falsificationist." In his own words, Popper's critical rationalism used both falsifications and the value of a theory in practice to explain progress.

Popper distinguishes between the creative, informal process from which accepted basic statements and accepted theories emerge, and the logical, formal process that compares all theories to all basic statements and defines falsifiability without saying how to methodologically accept basic statements and theories. The main issue addressed by Lakatos is whether the methodological side could be made more formal, in particular, whether the decision to select one among competing theories in the light of falsifications and corroborations could be justified using a formal logic. Such logic would be inductive: it justifies a universal law in view of instances. Lakatos and many others claimed that the decision should be so justified. In contradistinction, for Popper, the creative and informal part is guided by methodological rules, which naturally favour theories that are corroborated and have shown their merit over those that are falsified, but this methodology cannot be made rigorous.

Popper's way to analyze progress was through verisimilitude, a way to define how close a theory is to the truth, which he did not consider significant, except as an attempt to describe a concept already accepted in practice. Later, it was shown that the specific definition proposed by Popper cannot distinguish two false theories, as is the case for all theories in the history of science.

=== Sophisticated falsificationism ===
Hume explained induction with a theory of the mind that was in part inspired by Newton's theory of gravitation. Popper rejected Hume's explanation and proposed his own mechanism: science progresses by trial and error within an evolutionary epistemology. Hume believed that his psychological induction process follows laws of nature, but that this does not imply the existence of a method of justification based on logical rules. In fact, he argued that any induction mechanism, including the one his theory described could not be justified logically. Similarly, Popper adopted an evolutionary epistemology that implies that some laws explain progress, but insists that the process of trial and error is not rigorous and that an element of irrationality is unavoidable.

Though they be rational, these explanations cannot be turned into methods of justification. This was insufficient for philosophers such as Bertrand Russell, who once expressed the view that if Hume's problem cannot be solved, "there is no intellectual difference between sanity and insanity" and discussed what is needed for induction to be possible. He argued that for induction to be possible, a law to make inferences from matters of fact is needed and such law, unlike the principles of deductive logic, must be synthetic. He said "the only alternative to this hypothesis is complete scepticism". Lakatos approved Russell's justificationist view. His proposal of sophisticated falsificationism was natural in that context.

Therefore, Lakatos urged Popper to find an inductive principle behind the trial and error learning process and sophisticated falsificationism was his own approach to this challenge. Kuhn, Feyerabend, Musgrave and others mentioned and Lakatos himself acknowledged that this attempt failed, because no normative methodology existed—Lakatos' methodology was anarchy in disguise.

=== Popperian falsificationism ===
Popper's philosophy is sometimes said to fail to recognize the Quine-Duhem thesis, which would make it a form of dogmatic falsificationism. For example, Watkins wrote "apparently forgetting that he had once said 'Duhem is right [...]', Popper set out to devise potential falsifiers just for Newton's fundamental assumptions". But, Popper's philosophy is not always qualified of falsificationism in the pejorative manner associated with dogmatic or naive falsificationism. The problems of falsification are acknowledged by the falsificationists. For example, Chalmers pointed out that falsificationists freely admit that observation relies on theory. Thornton, referring to Popper, says that the predictions inferred from conjectures are not directly compared with the facts simply because all observation statements are theory-laden. For the critical rationalists, the problems of falsification are not an issue, because they do not try to make experimental falsifications logical or to logically justify them, nor to use them to logically explain progress. Instead, they rely on critical discussions around experimental falsifications. Lakatos made a distinction between a "falsification" (with quotation marks) in Popper's philosophy and a falsification (without quotation marks) that can be used in a systematic methodology where rejections are justified. He knew that Popper's philosophy had never been about this kind of justification, but claimed that it should have been. Sometimes, Popper and other falsificationists said that when a theory is falsified it is rejected (dogmatic falsificationism), but they said that in the general context of critical rationalism, in which all decisions are open to critical discussions and can be revised. Popper complained that his discussions of rejection are often taken out of context.

== Controversies ==
=== Creativity versus induction ===
As discussed in the section § Naive falsificationism, Lakatos and Popper agreed that universal scientific laws cannot be derived logically, except from broader laws that encompass them. However, unlike Popper, Lakatos believed that induction was the only alternative to deduction. He encouraged Popper to explicitly adopt an inductive approach and sought such an inductive method. However, Lakatos' method never provided precise inductive rules. In response to critiques from Thomas Kuhn, Paul Feyerabend, and Alan Musgrave, Lakatos admitted that his methodology relied on scientists' judgment. Feyerabend, in Against Method, argued that Lakatos' methodology was essentially epistemological anarchism in disguise, a view echoed by Musgrave. Later, Feyerabend noted that Lakatos proposed rules, but these rules did not specify when they must be applied and Feyerabend maintained his position.

Popper also proposed a methodology with rules, but these were non-inductive, as they did not independently confirm the validity of scientific laws. Instead, they relied on scientists' creativity or judgment to determine which theories to study, identify significant problems, and propose testable hypotheses. Citing Einstein, Popper argued that this creative process eliminated the need for an inductive methodology or a logical pathway to discover scientific laws.

=== Ahistorical versus historiographical ===
Lakatos' methodology built significantly on Popper's by incorporating a historical perspective. Lakatos supported his methodology with examples from the history of science. He defined what he called research programmes, that can be either pursued or abandoned. Research programmes are classified as progressive or degenerative; the latter are eventually abandoned. Lakatos claimed that this classification is largely supported by historical evidence. In contrast, Popper did not design his methodology to rigorously analyze the history of science. However, he occasionally called on historical examples. For instance, he noted that highly successful scientific theories were often disproven. He also introduced, before Lakatos, the notion of metaphysical research programs. He never intended to use them in a rigorous inductive methodology, but in a text that inspired Lakatos he discussed how they change over time. Later, he compared them to Kuhn's paradigms. Lakatos removed the "metaphysical" part and sought rigorous inductive rules. Later, he abandoned this research and adopted rules that require judgment. According to Eli Zahar, Lakatos "admitted that the difference between his position and Popper's was so small as to become purely verbal".

=== State of affairs as falsifier versus actual falsification ===
In 1974, Lakatos challenged Popper to demonstrate that his theory of falsifiability was itself falsifiable, asking, "Under what conditions would you abandon your demarcation criterion?" Popper responded, "I shall abandon my theory if Professor Lakatos succeeds in showing that Newton's theory is no more falsifiable by observable states of affairs than Freud's." In Popper's terminology, a "falsifier" is not an actual observation, but instead a hypothetical situation, a state of affairs, a logical concept that as such is not open to evasive methodological explanations. For example, Newton's law of gravitation states that a brick falls downward. A hypothetical observation that the brick falls upward is a falsifier (demonstrating falsifiability) even if something else such as strings attached to the brick could explain the observation.

In 1982, David Stove criticized Popper, claiming that Lakatos' challenge was successful. Stove contended that any observation appearing to contradict Newtonian physics could be explained by other laws or mechanisms, suggesting no truly "non-Newtonian" behavior was possible. Stove claimed that Popper's counterexamples, such as missiles following a "non-Newtonian trajectory" or objects not falling due to obvious counteracting forces, were either flawed (e.g., begging the question) or consistent with Newtonian physics. Popper reiterated that his falsifiability criterion was a purely logical concept, distinct from the practical ability to disprove a theory. He wrote, "An entire literature rests on the failure to observe this distinction."

=== Routine versus revolutionary science ===
Kuhn examined periods of normal science and the transitions (revolutions), that separate them. Popper was interested only in revolutions. He claimed that the purpose of science, mathematics, and metaphysics–all forms of knowledge—is to address and solve problems. Kuhn noted that during periods of normal science, scientists use established theories to routinely solve problems, questioning their validity only when the theory fails. This perspective aligns with Popper's view of problem solving, but places more emphasis on solving routine problems that do not challenge the underlying theory. Kuhn claimed that Popper focused too heavily on formal or logical falsifications and did not adequately explain the social and informal aspects of scientific progress.

=== Unfalsifiability versus falsity of astrology ===
Popper often used astrology as an example of a pseudoscience. He says that it is not falsifiable because both the theory itself and its predictions are too imprecise. Kuhn remarked that many predictions made by astrologers were quite precise and were often falsified.

=== Epistemological anarchism vs the scientific method ===
Feyeraband entirely rejected prescriptive methodology, including Lakatos' argument for ad hoc hypotheses, arguing that science could not have progressed without making use of every available method. He rejected reliance on a scientific method, along with any special authority for science that might derive from such a method. He said that the only possible universally valid methodological rule was epistemological anarchism (anything goes) was the only candidate. Ultimately, he claimed that science's special status derives from the value of the results rather than its method.

=== Sokal and Bricmont ===
In Fashionable Nonsense, physicists Alan Sokal and Jean Bricmont criticise falsifiability on several grounds but especially for its disregard of the importance of predictions:

...the history of science teaches us that scientific theories come to be accepted above all because of their successes. For example, on the basis of Newtonian mechanics, physicists have been able to deduce a great number of both astronomical and terrestrial motions, in excellent agreement with observations. Moreover, the credibility of Newtonian mechanics was reinforced by correct predictions such as the return of Halley's comet in 1759 and by spectacular successes such as finding Neptune in 1846 where Le Verrier and Adams predicted it should be.

Sokal and Bricmont also argue that the problems of falsifiability gave "rise to a strongly irrationalist reaction" of postmodernist epistemological relativism.

== Falsification and open science ==
=== Falsifiability and research integrity ===
At the core of Popper's falsification principle, Karl Popper's principle of falsification centers on figuring out what specific observation would prove a hypothesis wrong, and then trying to find it. The research process, therefore, is ideally structured to test a hypothesis by seeking the specific result that would falsify it. If a prediction is observed, the hypothesis is corroborated (supported); repeated failures to observe the predicted result may lead to its rejection in a critical discussion.

=== Compromised methodology ===
However, numerous authors have highlighted that due to the reproducibility crisis, the rejection is compromised by poor practices through the research process, including vague or ill-defined hypotheses, inadequate or under-reported data processing, and problematic data analysis. The issue is that the methodology maybe negatively influenced by the researcher degrees of freedom in which the procedures are carried out.

=== Open science solutions ===
The Open Science movement has introduced valuable tools and practices aimed at mitigating these biases and restoring the integrity required for meaningful falsification. By increasing transparency and rigor, Open Science measures help to reduce researcher degrees of freedom and improve rejection of wrong hypotheses. Key tools and practices include:

- Pre-registration: researchers commit to their hypotheses, methods, and analysis plans before data collection. This eliminates the possibility of post hoc (after the fact) changes and prevents the selective reporting of results, known as cherry picking.
- Open data and open methods: the sharing of data and materials facilitate independent attempts to replicate findings, which directly tests the robustness and potential falsity of previous results and help contribute to reduce biases for assessing biases.
- Reporting standards: checklists and standardized guidelines improve the quality and completeness of research reports, ensuring all procedural steps and data analyses are transparently detailed, allowing others to fully assess the study's adherence to falsification standards.

== See also ==
- Black swan theory – Theory of response to surprise events
- Contingency (philosophy) – Possible truths which are not necessary
- Defeasible reasoning – Reasoning that is rationally compelling, though not deductively valid
- Deniable encryption – Encryption where existence of a plaintext is difficult to proof - claim that a ciphertext decrypts to a particular plaintext can be falsified by possible decryption to another potential plaintext
- Fallibilism – Philosophical principle
- Metaphysical solipsism – Variety of philosophical idealism
- Methodological solipsism – Term in epistemology and philosophy of mind
- Not even wrong – English phrase
- Philosophical razor – Principle that allows one to eliminate unlikely explanations
  - Mike Alder § Newton's Flaming Laser Sword
  - Occam's razor – Philosophical problem-solving principle
- Philosophy of mathematics
- Plausible deniability – Ability to credibly deny responsibility or involvement
- Pragmatic maxim – Maxim of logic formulated by Charles Sanders Peirce
- Precambrian rabbit – Evolutionary biology hypothetical posed by J. B. S. Haldane
- Raven paradox – Paradox arising from the question of what constitutes evidence for a statement
- Russell's teapot – Analogy devised by Bertrand Russell
- Scientific method – Interplay between observation, experiment, and theory in science
  - Adversarial collaboration – Method of research
  - Experimentum crucis – Critical experiment
  - Explanatory power – Ability of a theory to explain a subject
  - Hypothetico-deductive model – Proposed description of the scientific method
  - Models of scientific inquiry
  - Predictive power – Ability of a scientific theory to generate testable predictions
  - Reproducibility – Aspect of scientific research
  - Statistical hypothesis testing – Method of statistical inference
  - Superseded scientific theories – Obsolete theories in natural history and natural philosophy
  - Theory-ladenness – Degree to which an observation is affected by one's presuppositions
- Scientific skepticism – Questioning of claims lacking empirical evidence
- Superdeterminism – Class of theories in quantum mechanics
- Tautology (logic) – In logic, a statement which is always true
- Trial and error – Method of problem-solving
