= Project on Scientific Knowledge and Public Policy =

The Project on Scientific Knowledge and Public Policy (SKAPP), based at the George Washington University in Washington, D.C., examines the nature of science and the ways in which it is both used and misused in government decision-making and legal proceedings. Through empirical research, conversations among scholars, and publications, SKAPP aims to enhance understanding of how knowledge is generated and interpreted. SKAPP's mission is to promote transparent decision-making based on the best available science in order to promote public safety and health.

SKAPP provides information about the impacts of existing legislation and regulation on drug safety, occupational health and safety, and environmental health. It has examined the use of science in regulation of specific hazards, including bisphenol A, beryllium, hexavalent chromium, and the butter-flavoring chemical diacetyl.

Support for SKAPP is provided by the George Washington University School of Public Health and Health Services, the Open Society Institute, and the Rockefeller Family Fund. Past support has been provided by the Common Benefit Trust, a fund established pursuant to a court order in the Silicone Gel Breast Implant Products Liability litigation; the Alice Hamilton Fund; and the Bauman Foundation.

== Scientific evidence and the law ==
The Supreme Court of the United States has issued three rulings which greatly impact the role scientists may play in providing expert testimony. These rulings are Daubert v. Merrell Dow Pharmaceuticals, General Electric v. Joiner, and Kumho Tire Co. v. Carmichael. Each address the "gatekeeper" role of the judge in determining the admissibility of expert testimony, with considerable implications for tort litigation.

== See also ==
Daubert v. Merrell Dow Pharmaceuticals

Daubert Standard

Kumho Tire Co. v. Carmichael
