= John Bruce Wallace =

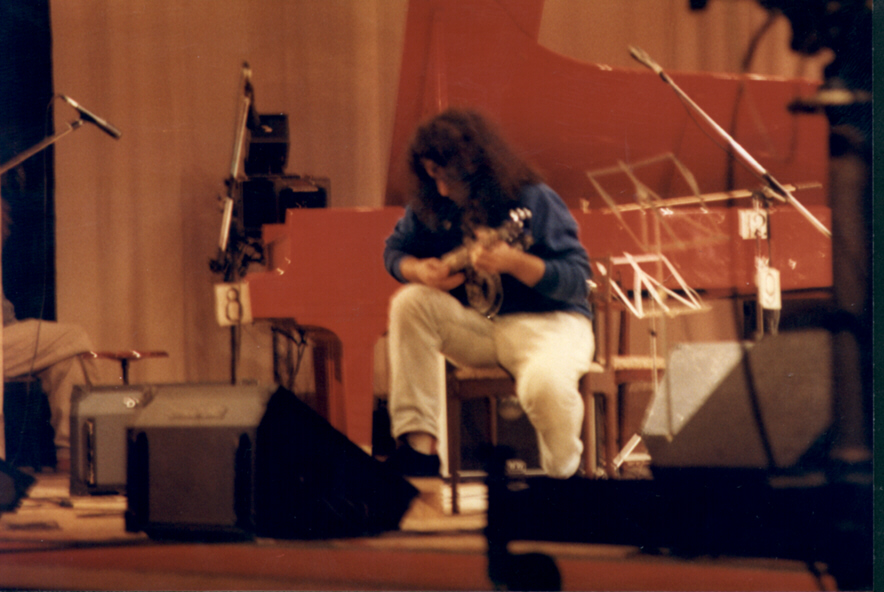

Background information
- Born: February 6, 1950; Calais, Maine, United States
- Genres: Avant-rock, experimental, free improvisation, free jazz, industrial, Avant-garde, Progressive Metal
- Occupation: Musician
- Instrument: Guitar
- Years active: 1966–present
- Label: Waving Bye
- Website: jacewbal.wixsite.com/mysite

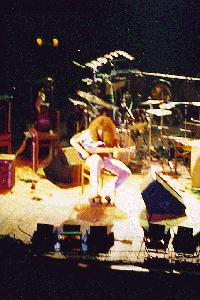
John Bruce Wallace in concert

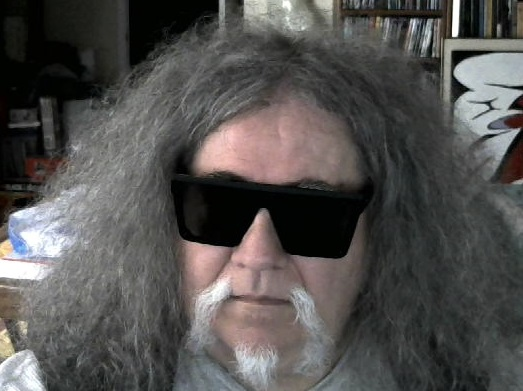
Personal Photo Shot

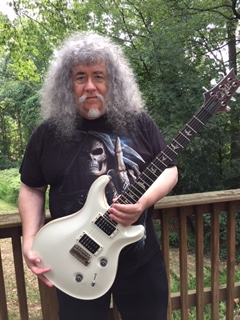
John Bruce Wallace Promo

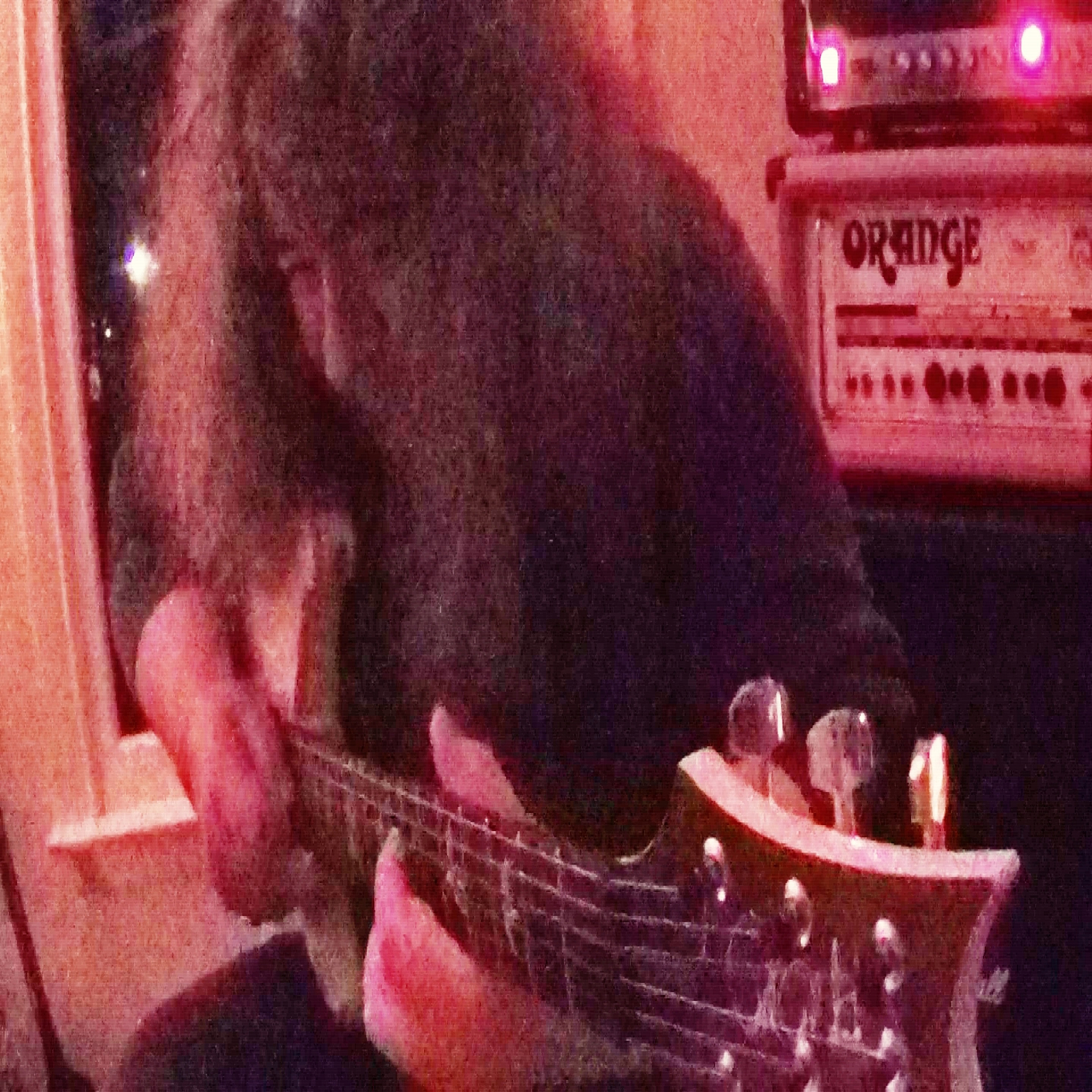
Improformence John Bruce Wallace

John Bruce Wallace is an American composer and avant-garde, free jazz, fusion, experimental, improvisational progressive metal guitarist.

== Early life ==
John Bruce Wallace a/k/a jacewbal was born February 6, 1950, in Calais, Maine, United States. John exhibited an affinity for the performing arts at an early age, first in acting, playing the lead roles in grade school plays, later he expanded his interests to include singing solo for his grade school classmates. Encouraged by his father to take up trumpet, he began studying clarinet while in grade school. By high school John had found "the Guitar" and would perform almost daily during summers on his family's front porch for the traffic passing by. Bands formed during this time were all short lived usually breaking up due to disagreements over the musical direction that the group members wanted to go in. John's early influences included Sun Ra, Pink Floyd, Frank Zappa, Rahsaan Roland Kirk, and Jimi Hendrix. After high school, John moved to Portland, Maine, to pursue music. He started several groups which all failed due to musical differences, although one failed after the band's equipment was stolen. However, during this time he would fill in on guitar for a number of traveling bands that were performing in night clubs in Portland. He was also at this time becoming more influenced by Experimental music, Progressive Metal, Avant garde, Rock, and Jazz.

On an invite to come to New York City to further develop musically, John gained insight into the inner musical culture opening potential doorways to pathways for future exploration. This move focused John's attention more closely at free improvisation, jazz, and 'free jazz' as practiced in Europe, by established artists such as Ornette Coleman, Anthony Braxton, Sun Ra, Cecil Taylor, Derek Bailey, and by certain young artists at the time beginning to work in Alphabet City on New York's lower East Side.

== Career ==
Being recognized for developing a new approach to electric guitar, the prime focus of his musical work is the expansion of the voicings of the electric guitar through improvised compositions. A free jazz solo performer interested in freely improvised music with a focus on generating extended sound statements within the options afforded through solo performance. His approach incorporates totally improvised sound expressions with emphasis on deconstruction of structure and pattern - while generating a narrative of the moment. His improvised compositions often incorporate multi-tonal qualities, dense, interwoven passages embellished with harmonic and micro-tonal sound statements, or silence further defined by irregular syntaxed rhythms and primitive beats. These extempore compositions incorporate complex musical riddles wherein are displayed the qualities of multiple instrument arrangements. His music was invited for performance consideration at the American Pavilion during the 1991 São Paulo Art Biennial, in São Paulo, Brazil. His recordings and performances have received reviews in leading foreign and domestic trade journals and publications as well as online media. In the independent music magazine Forced Exposure it was written about John,"For a guy whose list of desert islands discs contains works by Scelsi, Globokar, Kagel, Xenakis & others of the same ilk, it's interesting to hear such a loud, aggressively rock-like, feedback laden approach to solo...electric guitar."

Tours have included festivals in Russia and Lithuania, at the Vilnius Jazz Festival. In his Jazz Podium review of the Vilnius Festival Bernd Jahnke wrote "Solo guitarist John Bruce Wallace, in free improvisation, revamped the modern guitar tradition and, using the technical possibilities of his instrument, transferred it into an individual sound language."

In a 1994 review of Wallace's improvisational album Loud Noises in a Corner: Engagements on Urban Terrain, Mark Jenkins wrote in Washington City Paper "Wallace is a lot less predictable than that of many guitar warriors, and the best of it has a savage beauty that Eddie Van Halen couldn't achieve with six months of overdubs."

His recordings have received radio and Internet airplay across the United States, Canada, Europe, Russia, Central and South America, Australia, and Asia.

With the release of the album Taming The Day he joined the roster of Throne of Bael Records an experimental record label in the United Kingdom and has made his Discography available via Internet media services. He has recorded collaborations with Wilfried Hanrath (Hauchzart Ensemble), Pete Swinton, Antonella Eye Porcelluzzi, Vaders Orchestra (Ewald Wöstefeld), Siegfried Grundmann, and M. Nomized. In addition to his solo recordings, John has had compositions included in two compilations on Throne of Bael Records.

== Recent Single Video and Audio Recordings ==
- After Tones Of Propaganda 2021
- Ablated Musings After Sundown 2021
- Isolated Aspirations 2021
- Call of Anxiety on Evening Debate 2020
- Interrogative 2020
- The Pundit's Them 2019
- Loss At The Scales Of Non-Such 2018
- Non-Such And Pretenders 2018
- Aural Parables From Mountain Tops and Valleys 2018
- Improv For The Children 1991/2018
- Incantations And Redemptions 2018
- At The Druid's Feast 2018
- Imperious Inferences 2018
- Quantum Occlusion of Time 2018
- Temporal Fazia 2018
- Solitary Midnight Vespers 2018
- Night Cries of Soulful Reckoning 2017
- 2:30 am Prelude to Angst 2017
- Talisman 2017
- Was Was Not 2017
- Memories 2004 - 2016

== Collaborations and contributions ==
- midnightradio compilation 112 - (Comlipation by Midnightradio: "Shoals of Lost Care" by John Bruce Wallace) 2022
- midnightradio compilation 111 - (Comlipation by Midnightradio: "Without Clear Insight" by John Bruce Wallace) 2022
- midnightradio compilation 110 - (Comlipation by Midnightradio: "Escape From Yesterday" by John Bruce Wallace) 2022
- midnightradio compilation 109 - (Comlipation by Midnightradio: "Retreat from the Egress" by John Bruce Wallace) 2021
- midnightradio compilation 108 - (Comlipation by Midnightradio: "The Jagged Edge of Tomorrow" by John Bruce Wallace) 2021
- midnightradio compilation 107 - (Comlipation by Midnightradio: "Corrosive Brainstorming" by John Bruce Wallace) 2021
- midnightradio compilation 106 - (Comlipation by Midnightradio: "Symphonic Mesoscale Convective Inversion" by John Bruce Wallace) 2021
- midnightradio compilation 105 - (Comlipation by Midnightradio: "Demurred Interjections" by John Bruce Wallace) 2021
- Electronic Breakdown In The Morning - (John Bruce Wallace & Siegfried Grundmann Collaboration on Basetrack: 'Uebermensch' by John Bruce Wallace: E-Guitar and Effects, Siegfried Grundmann: Arrangement, Electronics and Effects) 2020
- Attenuated Lifeforce Articulation - (Collaboration on ORGASMUSLIEDER by ORGASMUSLIEDER Antonella Eye Porcelluzzi "Attenuated Lifeforce Articulation" by John Bruce Wallace) 2020
- Panic Virus (COVID - 19) (Usa) - (ANDREAS N°24 - Virus - Compilation - FRACTION STUDIO (M. Nomized) COMPILATION - 2020) 2020
- J M Basquiat Emotive Stroke - (A collaborative track based on For JM Basquiat by SRIGALA (Pete Swinton)) 2020
- Unscheduled Clarity In Flashes Of Not - VadersOrchestra Collaboration and rework with Vaders Orchestra (Ewald Wöstefeld) on John Bruce Wallace composition "Unscheduled Clarity in Flashes of Not". 2019
- Portland - Waiting In Phase - (John Bruce Wallace Collaboration on Portland a Wilfried Hanrath composition for open collaboration) 2019
- Memories - (by John Bruce Wallace and VadersOrchestra (Ewald Wöstefeld)) 2019
- Liber Limbia Vol. 516 Chapter 1: Secret light holt black. Future rich under opus fire.(Talisman - John Bruce Wallace aka jacewbal contribution to Liber Limbia Podcast) 2019

== Discography ==
- Grail 2023
- Divisive 2022
- Angst At Noon 2022
- Time Cutouts 2021
- Threadbare Meanings 2021
- Sometime In The Year 2021 2021
- No Name Yet! Come Back Tomorrow! 2021
- Hindsight At A Paused Moment Of Reflection 2021
- Waiting For The Rapture OR Pancake Breakfast 2020
- What Its Come Too 2020
- And The Gods Told Jokes 2020
- Tales From The Street 2020
- Disturbance 2020
- Can This Be Real 2020
- Retreat From The Egress 2020
- Threadbare Sexuality in Regalia 2020
- Collaborations 2020
- Cruzing The Seventieth Level 2020
- So Say Us 2020
- Saints of Later Day Politics 2019
- Zarathustra's Retreat From Plato's Cave 2019
- Under Armor of Cloistral Aspirations 2019
- Taming The Day 2018
- Choice Cuts 2018
- The Boundary Of Time's Sway 2018
- Shredding The Cultural Fabric 2018
- Battle of Betwixt and Between 2018
- A Long Way For Not 2018
- Aural Parables From Mountain Tops And Valleys 2018
- Lost To The Myths Of Idolatry 2018
- Society: A tonal Improvisation Played Out In Nine Parts 2018
- Society Shamans and Wizards 2018
- At The Druid's Feast 2018
- The Anguished Cries Of Discarded Souls 2018
- Land O Goshen 2018
- Illusion of Immanence 2018
- Sirens of A Distance Shore 2018
- Once This Way Has Passed 2018
- Chapel of Lost Soli 2018
- Angst After Evermore 2018
- Watching Time Disappear 2018
- Along Came Yesterday 2018
- Energized Exchange 2018
- Reflections 2017
- Impaled Dreams of the Believer 2000
- Riding the Cusp of Time 2000
- Electro Static Time Line 2000
- Loud Noises in a Corner: Engagements On Urban Terrain 1994
- John Bruce Wallace in Russia 1991
- Plumbing the Depths of Reason 1989
- Krank Cauls Disturb My Sleep 1988

== Personal life ==
John finds supplemental expression through painting and computer generated art. The need to express graphically traces back to when he was in grade school. As with his musical sound statements the concern is with the human condition and how we find ourselves in an alienating environment. Figurative images have explored the emotional aspects of the human experience, painted in oil done in a style that incorporated the use of his fingers in lieu of brushes; abstract images have explored the definition of the surface, as–well-as color. He has exhibited in several shows in New York City and Washington, DC, as-well-as, shows in Chicago, Minneapolis, Missouri, Maryland, Maine, and Virginia.

He also holds degrees in Philosophy from the University of Southern Maine (USM) and Information Systems Management from the University of Maryland University College (UMUC), a Certificate in Information Management from UMUC, and a Certificate in Legal Studies from Antioch School of Law. He studied philosophy at the University of Oregon. He has published a monograph in philosophy on Solipsism titled Genesis: Involvement: Generation "Deals with the philosophical issues concerning the problems of solipsism: the search for the 'self' and its relation to the world. Addressing such traditional questions as the nature of epistemological certainty, metaphysics, and the adequacy of logic and science as foundations of thought, the author expands his investigation to include an examination of the individual and the social sciences. The author draws upon the thought of various philosophers, contending that both metaphysical solipsism and epistemological solipsism are faulty notions seeded in an equally faulty endeavor The Quest for Certainty, concluding that it is necessary to return to the Socratic maxim, 'Know Thyself', as a pluralistic field of consciousness.", as well as papers on Artificial Intelligence and Consciousness, and Information Systems Management.

In the early 1990s John was diagnosed with Ménière's disease/syndrome a long term, progressive vestibular condition affecting the balance and hearing parts of the inner ear. Symptoms are acute attacks of vertigo (severe dizziness), fluctuating tinnitus, increasing deafness. As it progresses the vertigo may be less severe; however there may be periods of imbalance, adding to the distress. In the later stages tinnitus is more prominent and fluctuating hearing loss worsens. There is permanent damage to the balance organ and significant balance problems are common, presenting unique challenges to performances and recording. To overcome the hearing loss John has developed an increase in the finger sensations of how each note and cord vibrates, relying as much on the characteristic vibration of each tone as the aural/sonic identity of that tone. In 2010 his right hand was severely mangled by a dog bite, again presenting unique challenges for John since his playing style incorporates use of fingers, pick, and various other sections of the right hand in bringing forth the tones he prefers.
