= Atlantic Legal Foundation =

American nonprofit organization

- Founded: 1977
- Type: 501(c)(3) organization
- Tax ID no.: 23-2022920
- Purpose: Constitutional Issues, Corporate Governance, Property Rights, School Choice, Sound Science
- Location: Larchmont, New York
- Region served: United States
- Website: www.atlanticlegal.org

Established in 1977, Atlantic Legal Foundation, also known as ALF, is a 501(c)(3) nonprofit, nonpartisan public interest law firm that litigates individual liberty, deregulation, free enterprise, and private property rights. The foundation was started to pursue a “deep commitment to redressing the bias against business which manifests itself in favor of narrow ‘consumer’ or ‘environmental’ concerns.” ALF has argued against environmental and worker regulations promulgated by federal agencies and works to promote “school-choice”. Atlantic Legal provides legal representation, without fee, to certain individuals, corporations, trade associations, parents, scientists, and educators.

The Foundation frequently files amicus curiae briefs in high-profile court cases before state supreme courts, federal circuit courts, and the United States Supreme Court.

Atlantic Legal is overseen by a board of directors composed of corporate executives, partners of major law firms, and current and retired corporate chief legal officers. The Board reviews and decides the cases in which Atlantic Legal will participate. The Foundation also has an Advisory Council, which consists of attorneys, scientists, medical doctors, and educators.

ALF is funded by a variety of individuals and organizations. Major donors have included the Koch Brothers' Claude R. Lambe Foundation, Sarah Scaife Foundation, ExxonMobil, Chevron, DuPont, and the Joyce and Donald Rumsfeld Association.

== Programs ==
=== Constitutional issues ===
Atlantic Legal has participated in cases involving a broad range of state and federal constitutional law issues. The Foundation has filed briefs in cases concerning free speech, equal protection, due process, federalism, separation of powers, property rights, and international law.

ALF filed amicus briefs in high-profile U.S. Supreme Court cases such as

- Rumsfeld v. FAIR (arguing withholding federal funds from colleges that refused to permit military recruiters on campus did not violate the First Amendment);
- Crawford v. Marion County Election Board (submitting an amicus brief on behalf of the Conservative Party of New York State arguing that a Voter ID law did not violate the First or Fourteenth Amendments); and
- Wal-Mart v. Dukes (submitting an amicus brief in support of Walmart arguing for increased scrutiny of class certification, i.e., that courts should be more skeptical of expert testimony supporting the commonality of class-plaintiffs).
- In Crosby v. National Foreign Trade Council, a Supreme Court case involving a state law barring state agencies from doing business with Myanmar (formerly Burma), Atlantic Legal submitted a brief on behalf of former President Gerald R. Ford as well as a group of former Secretaries of State, Defense, Treasury, and Commerce, former National Security Advisors, former presidential chiefs of staff, and senior members of Congress.

The Foundation has recently filed briefs in the Supreme Court of the United States challenging the constitutionality of the President's recess appointments to the National Labor Relations Board in NLRB v. Noel Canning.

In 2013, ALF filed an amicus brief in the United States Supreme Court urging the court to side with the petitioners in Daimler AG v. Bauman. At issue in that case was the conduct of a U.S.-owned corporation in Argentina during the Dirty War. a labor dispute developed at the Mercedes-Benz plant in González Catán. Mercedes-Benz reported the labor leaders as "subversives" to the right-wing military junta, had junta forces stationed within the factory, and allowed the junta to conduct raids on workers. During the dispute, twenty-two labor leaders were kidnapped, tortured, and murdered. Afterwards, Mercedes-Benz Argentina provided the police chief responsible for the "disappearances" with legal defense against human rights abuse accusations. ALF argued that DaimlerChrysler AG could not be held liable for the conduct of its Argentinian subsidiary and because a German Corporation had more interest in the suit's resolution.

=== “Sound science” ===
Atlantic Legal's “sound science” program advocates for the admissibility of medical testimony in toxic tort, product liability, and other types of litigation. This program aligns with their resolve to "redress[] the bias against business which manifests itself in favor of narrow ‘consumer’ or ‘environmental’ concerns.” Atlantic Legal challenges the admissibility of "junk science" in the courtroom. ALF has authored amicus briefs on behalf of scientists and scholars, including two dozen Nobel Laureates. The Foundation claims it has "successfully challenged bogus theories of medical causation" in toxic tort cases involving asbestos and other hazardous substances.

In the Supreme Court case Daubert v. Merrell Dow Pharmaceuticals, a decision that set evidentiary standards for expert witness testimony, the Court's majority opinion cited the Foundation's amicus curiae brief as part of its analysis. Other important Supreme Court cases where Atlantic Legal's legal briefs have affected the outcome include Joiner v. General Electric and Kumho Tire Co. v. Carmichael (in which the Foundation's amicus brief was also cited), which, in conjunction with Daubert, comprise the so-called "Daubert trilogy" of cases that lay out the ''Daubert'' standard for expert witness testimony in federal courts.

In all three cases ALF persuaded the Court to tighten evidentiary standards for plaintiff experts and "succeed[ed] in having plaintiff’s scientific experts deemed unsuitable".

Much of ALF's recent efforts in the “sound science” arena have involved challenging toxic tort claims against manufacturers and producers of asbestos products, efforts that have rewarded those corporations with favorable decisions in several state courts.

=== Corporate governance ===
ALF's corporate governance program was established to advocate against ‘intrusive regulation of business’ and to foster corporate governance. ALF states that "corporate accountability is best secured by the personal choices of customers and investors, not by ineffective regulators or activist courts."

ALF works to defend corporations from class action lawsuits. Such cases include the Supreme Court's landmark curtailment of class actions in Wal-Mart v. Dukes, where Atlantic Legal filed briefs in support WalMart, asking the Court to toss-out Betty Dukes' sex-discrimination case against Walmart.

=== School choice ===
ALF's work in education focuses on supporting charter schools, including launching a website dedicated to defending charter schools from their detractors. A major part of this effort is publishing a series of state-specific union-busting guides titled "Leveling the Playing Field", which inform charter school leaders how to combat labor union organizing campaigns.

ALF also evaluated and proposed reforms to New York's charter renewal procedures and has counseled individual charter schools.

=== Position papers ===
ALF regularly publishes papers considering legal issues of public concern including those concerning charter schools and has previously published papers advocating for deregulation of the environment.

== Funding ==
ALF is a non-profit 501(c)(3) foundation that relies on grants from corporations, private foundations, law firms, and individuals. The Foundation has received an estimated $3.9 million in contributions since 1985.

=== Ties to the Koch Brothers ===
The Claude R. Lambe Foundation—a Foundation of the Koch Brothers—made a $20,000 contribution to ALF in 2002. ALF has submitted briefs in a number of cases with other legal foundations and organizations that have funding connections with the Kochs, including the Mackinac Center for Public Policy, Citizens United, the Goldwater Institute, the Cato Institute, and the National Federation of Independent Business.

=== Sarah Scaife Foundation ===
ALF has received the majority of its funding—$2.53 million—from the Sarah Scaife Foundation that was founded by the late-conservative billionaire Richard Mellon Scaife. In addition to ALF, the Sarah Scaife Foundation donates tens of millions of dollars annually to conservative and business-friendly lobbying groups, foundations, and non-profits including the American Legislative Exchange Council (ALEC) (~$100,000), the Heritage Foundation ($15 million), and the American Enterprise Institute (AEI) ($4.4 million).

=== Corporations ===
While individual donors and non-profit organizations comprise the majority of ALF's funding, the Foundation has also received contributions from corporations such as the oil company ExxonMobil. Exxon (and the ExxonMobil Foundation) contributed $39,000 to ALF since 2001.
