= Expert shopping =

Practice of finding an expert who supports a certain claim

Expert shopping or witness shopping or expert mining is the practice of finding an authority on a given subject whose professional opinion is skewed toward the answer that the searching party already prefers. In civil and criminal litigation, expert shopping occurs when, having received an unfavourable opinion from one expert, a litigant seeks opinions from one or more other experts, until he finds an expert whose opinion is favourable to his case. Expert shopping may result in a battle of the experts.

An expert witness can be paid to testify in favor of one side of the case. In this case, the expert witnesses on each side may have totally different opinions. This use is well-known use.

Certain news media have been accused of "expert shopping" in relation to their news reports.

== History ==
Expert shopping in litigation began in the nineteenth century.
