= Davie v Magistrates of Edinburgh =

Davie v Magistrates of Edinburgh 1953 S.C. 34. encapsulates the Scots law position regarding the role of expert witnesses in providing their opinion to the court in criminal and civil proceedings.

== Case ==
In Davie v Magistrates of Edinburgh, an expert witness gave evidence concerning the effect of shock waves in blasting operations and referred to a specific section of a pamphlet that allegedly supported his opinion. The Court of Session disproved of the Lord Ordinary's action of adopting other parts of the pamphlet that the expert had not made reference to.

" The Court cannot...rely upon such works for the purpose of displacing or criticising the witness's testimony." - at 41.

== Law ==
Lord President Cooper stated that "their duty is to furnish the judge or jury with the necessary scientific criteria for testing the accuracy of their conclusions, so as to enable the Judge or jury to form their own independent judgment by the application of these criteria to the facts proved in evidence." Therefore, an expert witness should only offer their opinion as to the facts that have already been established in court, and "should not hinder the trier of fact's duty by telling them how to assess the evidence that they have heard". The weight to be given to the evidence provided by the expert witness is a matter for the judge (in civil, or summary criminal proceedings) or jury (in solemn criminal proceedings) alone.

The court also stated that "expert witnesses are only required in order that certain facts can be assessed and understood in their specialist/scientific context".

Moreover, in this case it was held that "in some situations, the scientific knowledge that an expert witness claims to have must be proved in court", such as in Hewat v Edinburgh Corporation 1974 S.C. 30. This is to prevent false claims of credentials that may affect the reliability of the opinion advanced by the expert witness.

As a result of this case, only the extracts of any literature relied upon by an expert witness whilst giving their testimony may be used against them to challenge their opinion. The remainder of any texts/journals is not admissible and thus cannot be relied upon by the expert or any other party to the proceedings.

== Notes ==
- apt.rcpsych.org
- www.swarb.co.uk
- Raitt, F, Evidence: Principles, Policy and Practice, Edinburgh: W. Green, 2008
