= Kumho Tire Co. v. Carmichael =

1999 United States Supreme Court case

- Supreme Court of the United States

Argued December 7, 1998 Decided March 23, 1999
- Full case name: Kumho Tire Company, Ltd., et al. v. Patrick Carmichael et al.
- Citations: 526 U.S. 137 (more) 119 S. Ct. 1167; 143 L. Ed. 2d 238; 1999 U.S. LEXIS 2189; 67 U.S.L.W. 4179; 50 U.S.P.Q.2D (BNA) 1177; 50 Fed. R. Evid. Serv. (Callaghan) 1373; Prod. Liab. Rep. (CCH) ¶ 15,470; 99 Cal. Daily Op. Service 2059; 29 ELR 20638; 1999 Colo. J. C.A.R. 1518; 12 Fla. L. Weekly Fed. S 141
- Argument: Oral argument

Case history
- Prior: Motions to exclude testimony & for summary judgment granted, Carmichael v. Samyang Tires, Inc., 923 F.Supp. 1514 (S.D. Ala. 1996).; Reversed, 131 F.3d 1433 (11th Cir. 1997).; Petition for writ of certiorari granted, Kumho Tire Co., Ltd. v. Carmichael, 524 U.S. 936 (1998).

Holding
- The Daubert standard governs the admission of expert testimony from non-scientist expert witnesses in federal courts.

Court membership
- Chief Justice William Rehnquist Associate Justices John P. Stevens · Sandra Day O'Connor; Antonin Scalia · Anthony Kennedy; David Souter · Clarence Thomas; Ruth Bader Ginsburg · Stephen Breyer

Case opinions
- Majority: Breyer, joined by Rehnquist, O'Connor, Scalia, Kennedy, Souter, Thomas, Ginsburg
- Concurrence: Scalia, joined by O'Connor, Thomas
- Concur/dissent: Stevens

Laws applied
- Federal Rule of Evidence 702

Kumho Tire Co. v. Carmichael, 526 U.S. 137 (1999), is a United States Supreme Court case which held that the Daubert standard applies to expert testimony from non-scientists. The opinion also clarified that the standard's application in part depends on the facts of the case and of the particular nature of the expert.

The Daubert standard was first articulated by the Court in Daubert v. Merrell Dow Pharmaceuticals, Inc. (1993) and describes how federal courts should determine whether to admit expert testimony. The Daubert standard directs lower courts to examine a witness's methodology and qualifications for relevance and reliability based on a non-exhaustive list of factors. However, the Court's initial description of the Daubert standard focused on testimony from scientists and involving scientific methodologies, and until Kumho Tire, it remained unclear whether and how the standard applied to non-scientist experts like engineers. Kumho Tire resolved this by holding that, while the larger requirements that expert testimony be relevant and reliable were universal, a court in evaluating an expert may consider any number of factors, including those not listed in the original Daubert opinion, depending on the case. The immediate case revolved around a tire failure analyst's method for distinguishing between tire blowouts caused by manufacturing defect and blowouts caused by improper usage, with the Court approving a federal judge's decision to not admit the analyst's testimony due to lack of reliability.

Legal experts generally classify Kumho Tire as closing a trilogy of expert-witness cases additionally comprising Daubert and General Electric Co. v. Joiner. Kumho Tire has been the subject of analysis from both practical litigation perspectives and epistemological studies. Although Kumho Tire itself only applies to federal courts, some states have incorporated the ruling into their own rules of evidence.

== Legal background ==
In the American legal system, parties to litigation may sometimes prepare expert witnesses to testify concerning technical or scientific matters. At the time of Kumho Tire, Federal Rule of Evidence 702 described the standard for admitting expert witnesses to testify in federal court as so:

If scientific, technical, or other specialized knowledge will assist the trier of fact to understand the evidence or to determine a fact in issue, a witness qualified as an expert by knowledge, skill, experience, training, or education, may testify thereto in the form of an opinion or otherwise.

For many decades, including before the Federal Rules of Evidence were passed, courts admitted expert witnesses based on whether their methods were generally accepted in their discipline, in what was known as the Frye standard. Following an increase in toxic tort and medical litigation in the 1980s and a concomitant increase in expert testimony, some of which was considered dubious, legal experts began to call for more stringent requirements for the admission of experts. Some courts began to adopt stricter standards in response, though other courts maintained a relatively low level of scrutiny.

In 1993, the Supreme Court decided Daubert v. Merrell Dow Pharmaceuticals, Inc., which purported to settle the debate by overruling the Frye standard in favor of a new "Daubert standard." Daubert emphasized that judges served a "gatekeeping function" with regard to evidence and should scrutinize purported expert testimony for relevance and reliability before admitting it. The Court identified four non-exhaustive factors to use when determining whether scientific expert testimony is admissible: "whether the theory or technique can be and has been tested, whether it has been subjected to peer review and publication, the known or potential error rate, the existence and maintenance of standards controlling the technique’s operation, and whether it is generally accepted in the scientific community." The Court further reinforced Daubert in the 1997 case General Electric Co. v. Joiner, where it held that a trial court's application of the Daubert standard could only be reversed on appeal if it constituted an abuse of discretion.

Although the Supreme Court stated in Daubert that the standard and factors governed the admissibility of "scientific" experts who base their expertise on the scientific method and related principles, it also declined to discuss the standard for admitting "non-scientific" experts like engineers, who base their expertise on their technical knowledge and experience. Thus, in the years after Daubert, the courts of appeals split not only on what kinds of experts the Daubert standard governed, but also how the standard would apply to a non-scientific expert, particularly with regard to which if any of the four Daubert factors to use.

== Facts and initial procedural history ==
On July 6, 1993, a minivan transporting eight members of the Carmichael family, including the driver, experienced a rear tire blowout and overturned on a road in Alabama. One passenger died, while everyone else inside the vehicle was injured. The Carmichaels subsequently sued Samyang Tires, the manufacturer and distributor of the blown-out tire, alleging that it was defective. Crucial to the Carmichaels' strategy was a tire failure analyst named Dennis Carlson, who provided deposition testimony opining that, based on certain observations he had made of the tire's remains, the cause of the blowout was likely a manufacturing defect rather than improper inflation or misuse. Carlson's method for determining whether blowouts were caused by manufacturing defect or user error rested on visually examining tire remains for the presence of four signs of defective manufacture; Carlson claimed that the tire was defective because it exhibited two of the four signs. Carlson's knowledge on the subject came from his past experience designing tires for Michelin, as well as a master's degree in mechanical engineering from Georgia Tech.

Samyang moved to exclude Carlson's testimony, arguing that his methodology for assessing the causes of tire failure failed the Daubert standard. A federal judge of the Southern District of Alabama agreed and granted the motion; because Carlson's testimony was the sole evidence the Carmichaels had that the tire was defective, the judge also granted summary judgment and threw out the case. The Eleventh Circuit Court of Appeals reversed the ruling on the basis that Carlson was not a scientist, nor was his method for examining tires scientific in nature. Rather, his qualifications as an expert came from his experience, and thus his methods and testimony were not governed by the Daubert standard. Samyang appealed and the Supreme Court granted certiorari on June 22, 1998.

By the time the case reached the Supreme Court, Samyang had changed its name to Kumho Tire, hence the present name of the case.

== Supreme Court ==
=== Briefs and oral arguments ===
Due to concerns about the case's potential impact on the admissibility of evidence in both criminal and civil trials, several organizations filed "friend of the court" briefs, with nineteen such briefs in total. A group of law enforcement organizations filed a brief arguing that the methods used to gather forensic evidence in crime scene investigations should be exempt from the Daubert standard. Briefs favoring Kumho Tire were submitted by the Justice Department and several prominent legal organizations, such as the Atlantic Legal Foundation, Washington Legal Foundation, and United States Chamber of Commerce, as well as groups associated with the tort, automotive, and engineering sectors, such as the American Tort Reform Association, Rubber Manufacturers Association, and National Association of Manufacturers; while briefs supporting the Carmichaels were submitted by the Association of Trial Lawyers of America, Center for Auto Safety, and Public Citizen, among other advocacy groups.

The Court held oral arguments on December 7, 1998. In an article reflecting on the decision, the lawyer representing Kumho Tire at the oral arguments characterized the justices as largely sympathetic to his case, excepting Stephen Breyer, who "appeared equally testy for both sides;" John Paul Stevens, who "seemed uncommitted;" and Clarence Thomas, who did not ask any questions at all.

=== Decision ===
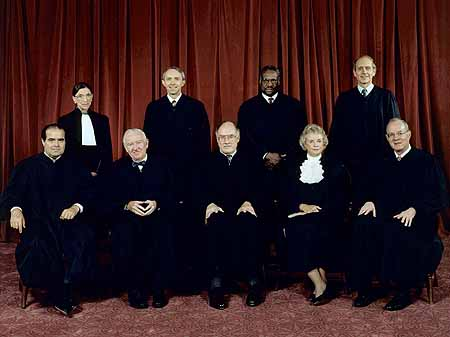
The Supreme Court justices in 1998. Stephen Breyer, the author of Kumho Tire, is standing furthest to the right. Antonin Scalia and John Paul Stevens, who wrote separately, are seated furthest and second-furthest to the left, respectively.

The Court delivered its decision on March 23, 1999. Justice Breyer wrote the majority opinion, which reversed the appeals court and held that the Daubert standard applied to all expert testimony, scientific or otherwise, with the caveat that which Daubert factors to consider depended on the expert.

As an initial matter, Breyer's opinion noted that Rule 702 refers to knowledge and expertise generically, and thus rejected the idea that Rule 702 prescribed different standards for scientific and non-scientific expert testimony. He also wrote that such a distinction was untenable because science and technology heavily overlap. With regard to the Daubert factors in particular, Breyer stated that they were "general observations" intended to guide a court's analysis, not a "definitive checklist or test." Breyer thus wrote that in applying the Daubert standard to gauge experts for reliability, a court has "broad latitude," "considerable leeway," and "discretionary authority" to apply factors of their choosing, though expert witnesses were expected to have "the same level of intellectual rigor that characterizes the practice of an expert in the relevant field." He also warned courts that this flexibility did not justify admitting testimony based on unreliable or pseudoscientific disciplines like astrology or necromancy.

Having justified the application of Daubert to the present situation, Breyer proceeded to apply it to Carlson's methods. He stated that the crux of a Daubert analysis was whether an expert's methods were relevant and reliable as applied to the particular case, not generally. Thus, the question that mattered with regard to Carlson was whether he "could reliably determine the cause of [the Carmichael's] tires' separation." Recalling Joiner's standard of review, Breyer concluded that the Alabama federal judge did not abuse his discretion in excluding Carlson's testimony. Carlson's method, according to Breyer, raised reliability concerns because it relied on a largely subjective assessment, the basic premise underlying Carlson's four-factor test was not generally accepted, and Carlson had made certain questionable statements during his deposition; he was unable to identify how many miles the blown-out tire had traveled for, and conceded that it exhibited some minor signs of misuse.

Justice Stevens disagreed with the Court's decision to apply the Daubert standard themselves, and wrote a partial dissent stating that the Court should have remanded the decision back to the court of appeals for fresh reconsideration. Antonin Scalia also wrote separately to remark that, although lower courts maintained some discretion over when and how to apply the Daubert factors, they could not "abandon the gatekeeping function" and unreasonably apply the factors. Sandra Day O'Connor and Justice Thomas joined the concurrence.

== Analysis ==
Authors often consider Kumho Tire to be the last case in a "Daubert trilogy" additionally consisting of Daubert and Joiner. Some authors also suggest connections between the three cases and other decisions. A 2000 survey indicated that the courts of appeals had developed different ways of applying Kumho Tire. Joëlle Anne Moreno, an assistant professor at New England School of Law, argued that Kumho Tire was a major revision of Daubert that was motivated by Justice Breyer's pragmatist judicial philosophy, as well as his concerns with how lower courts were applying Daubert; she pointed to changes in how lower courts utilized the Daubert standard after Kumho Tire as indicating a significant change.

In 2000, Congress amended Rule 702 to more clearly reflect the Daubert standard, including the developments in Kumho Tire. In particular, the revised Rule 702 requires expert testimony to be "the product of reliable principles and methods" that are "reliably applied [...] to the facts of the case." The Uniform Rules of Evidence, a model law for states, was also revised in 1999 in light of Kumho Tire. Although the Daubert trilogy defines the federal standard for admitting expert witness, some states have incorporated the Daubert trilogy into their state evidence rules. The level to which state courts have adopted Kumho Tire in particular is somewhat controversial. A 2004 survey found that sixteen states had done so. A 2012 article stated that "at least" nine states had adopted Kumho Tire.

Kumho Tire received a mixed reception from the legal community. Marcy Hogan Greer, a lawyer for Fulbright & Jaworski, referred to the decision as a "landmark opinion." D. Michael Risinger, a law professor at Seton Hall University, wrote that Kumho Tire "was a great opinion, much more so than Daubert itself," praising it for clarifying the scope and function of the reliability determination under Daubert. However, he believed that many attorneys and judges, particularly in criminal cases, had poorly applied the case. Edward D. Cavanagh, a law professor at St. John's University, remarked that the decision was unsurprising, though disappointing in that the Court did not do more to curtail "satellite litigation" on expert witness admissibility. Attorneys Mark Lewis & Mark Kitrick criticized the opinion as over-expanding judges' roles in examining expert testimony, at the expense of the jury's role. Authors have discussed Kumho Tire's implications for a variety of specific litigation topics, ranging from aviation to psychology.

Aside from practical litigation matters, Kumho Tire has also been examined for its epistemological stances. In a 2014 book and 2015 article, philosopher Susan Haack argued that, while Daubert placed emphasis on the philosophy of science via references to Karl Popper and Carl Hempel, Kumho Tire deemphasized the importance of science in favor of reliable knowledge. One article claimed that Kumho Tire reflected a "realist-constructivist" view, as it "implicitly accept[ed] the notion that expert knowledge is influenced by the social, economic, and political situation of the expert and expert communities," but refused to consider such knowledge to be wholly socially constructed. In an article which engaged in both legal and philosophical discussion, Joseph Sanders, a law professor at the University of Houston, wrote that Kumho Tire is best read as requiring "judges to assess non-scientific testimony in, as nearly as possible, the same way that they currently assess scientific testimony."

== See also ==
- Barefoot v. Estelle (1983), concerning constitutional issues in expert testimony
- Diaz v. United States (2024), concerning limitations on the content of expert testimony
