= Frye standard =

U.S. legal test on the admissibility of scientific evidence

In United States law, the Frye standard, Frye test, or general acceptance test is a judicial test used in some U.S. state courts to determine the admissibility of scientific evidence. It provides that expert opinion based on a scientific technique is admissible only when the technique is generally accepted as reliable in the relevant scientific community. In Daubert v. Merrell Dow Pharmaceuticals, 509 U.S. 579 (1993), the U.S. Supreme Court held that the Federal Rules of Evidence superseded Frye as the standard for admissibility of expert evidence in federal courts. Some states, however, still adhere to the Frye standard.

== History ==
This standard comes from Frye v. United States, 293 F. 1013 (D.C. Cir. 1923), a case discussing the admissibility of systolic blood pressure deception test as evidence. The Court in Frye held that expert testimony must be based on scientific methods that are sufficiently established and accepted. The court wrote:

Just when a scientific principle or discovery crosses the line between the experimental and demonstrable stages is difficult to define. Somewhere in this twilight zone the evidential force of the principle must be recognized, and while the courts will go a long way in admitting expert testimony deduced from a well-recognized scientific principle or discovery, the thing from which the deduction is made must be sufficiently established to have gained general acceptance in the particular field in which it belongs. (Emphasis added.)

In many but not all jurisdictions, the Frye standard has been superseded by the Daubert standard. States still following Frye include: California, Illinois, Minnesota, New York, Pennsylvania, and Washington. New Jersey follows a model that closely resembles Daubert for civil, criminal and quasi-criminal.

== Definition ==
The court must determine that the scientific evidence is "generally accepted" by a significant portion of the relevant scientific community in order for it to satisfy the Frye standard. This pertains to any methods, ideas, or strategies that could be used during a court case.

In practical application of this standard, those who were proponents of a widely disputed scientific issue had to provide a number of experts to speak to the validity of the science behind the issue in question.

Novel techniques, placed under the scrutiny of this standard, forced courts to examine papers, books and judicial precedents on the subject at hand to make determinations as to the reliability and "general acceptance."

== Commentary ==
While Daubert has superseded Frye, the standard of Daubert is not substantially different. While the focus of the inquiry has changed, the result rarely does. Accordingly, the Daubert standard has been described as "Frye in drag."

As an alternative to this standard, the courts have generally adopted Rule 702 of the Federal Rules of Evidence, as the primary for expert testimony and scientific evidence.

== See also ==
- Daubert standard, a later precedent for the admissibility of expert testimony
- Objective historian
