= Epistemological solipsism =

In epistemology, epistemological solipsism is the claim that one can only be sure of the existence of one's mind. The existence of other minds and the external world is not necessarily rejected but one can not be sure of its existence.

== Overview ==
Epistemological solipsists claim that realism begs the question: assuming there is a universe that is independent of the agent's mind, the agent can only ever know of this universe through the agent's senses. How is the existence of the independent universe to be scientifically studied? If people set up a camera to photograph the moon when they are not looking at it, then at best they determine that there is an image of the moon in the camera when they eventually look at it. Logically, this does not assure that the moon itself (or even the camera) existed at the time the photograph is supposed to have been taken. To establish that it is an image of an independent moon requires many other assumptions that amount to begging the question.

This relates to Kantian transcendental aspects of the world, in which a new factor can be included, if the current axioms neither validate nor invalidate it. The continuum hypothesis and the axiom of choice are examples of possible transcendental decision points. Solipsism in its weak form is characterized by the repeated decision to not accept transcendental factors, a logical minimalism. In its strong form, the denial of the existence of an argument for the existence of an independent universe may be justified in principle in an empirical manner. Whether the nonexistence of a proof means the nonexistence of the entity is a transcendental choice.

== See also ==
- Metaphysical solipsism
- Methodological solipsism
