= Daubert standard =

Expert witness evidence rule in American law

In United States federal law, the Daubert standard (/ˈdɔːbərt/ DAW-bərt) is a rule of evidence regarding the admissibility of expert witness testimony. A party may raise a Daubert motion, a special motion in limine raised before or during trial, to exclude the presentation of unqualified evidence to the jury. The Daubert trilogy are the three United States Supreme Court cases that articulated the Daubert standard:

- Daubert v. Merrell Dow Pharmaceuticals, Inc. (1993), which held that Rule 702 of the Federal Rules of Evidence did not incorporate the Frye standard as a basis for assessing the admissibility of scientific expert testimony, but that the rule incorporated a flexible reliability standard instead;
- General Electric Co. v. Joiner (1997), which held that a district court judge may exclude expert testimony when there are gaps between the evidence relied on by an expert and that person's conclusion, and that an abuse-of-discretion standard of review is the proper standard for appellate courts to use in reviewing a trial court's decision of whether it should admit expert testimony;
- Kumho Tire Co. v. Carmichael (1999), which held that the judge's gatekeeping function identified in Daubert applies to all expert testimony, including that which is non-scientific.

Important appellate-level opinions that clarify the standard include Judge Alex Kozinski's opinion in Daubert on remand, and Judge Edward Becker's opinion.

== Definition ==
In Daubert, seven members of the court agreed on the following guidelines for admitting scientific expert testimony:

- Judge is gatekeeper: Under Rule 702 of the Federal Rules of Evidence, the task of "gatekeeping", or assuring that scientific expert testimony truly proceeds from "scientific knowledge", rests on the trial judge.
- Relevance and reliability: This requires the trial judge to ensure that the expert's testimony is "relevant to the task at hand" and that it rests "on a reliable foundation". Daubert v. Merrell Dow Pharms., Inc., 509 U.S. 579, 584-587. Concerns about expert testimony cannot be simply referred to the jury as a question of weight. Furthermore, the admissibility of expert testimony is governed by Rule 104(a), not Rule 104(b); thus, the judge must find it more likely than not that the expert's methods are reliable and reliably applied to the facts at hand.
- Scientific knowledge = scientific method/methodology: A conclusion will qualify as scientific knowledge if the proponent can demonstrate that it is the product of sound "scientific methodology" derived from the scientific method.
- Illustrative factors: The court defined "scientific methodology" as the process of formulating hypotheses and then conducting experiments to prove or falsify the hypothesis, and provided a set of illustrative factors (i.e., not a "test") in determining whether these criteria are met:
  1. Whether the theory or technique employed by the expert is generally accepted in the scientific community;
  2. Whether it has been subjected to peer review and publication;
  3. Whether it can be and has been tested;
  4. Whether it has a known error rate; and
  5. Whether the research was conducted independent of the particular litigation or dependent on an intention to provide the proposed testimony.

In 2000, the Federal Rules of Evidence, Rule 702 was amended in an attempt to codify and structure elements embodied in the "Daubert trilogy".

== Use ==
Although the Daubert standard is now the law in federal court and over half of the states, the Frye standard remains the law in some jurisdictions including California, Illinois, Pennsylvania, and Washington. Florida passed a bill to adopt the Daubert standard as the law governing expert witness testimony, which took effect on July 1, 2013. On May 23, 2019, the Florida Supreme Court accepted the Daubert standard. On August 28, 2020, The Maryland Court of Appeals adopted the Daubert standard.

Although trial judges have always had the authority to exclude inappropriate testimony, prior to Daubert, trial courts often preferred to let juries hear evidence proffered by both sides. Once certain evidence has been excluded by a Daubert motion because it fails to meet the relevancy and reliability standard, it will likely be challenged when introduced again in another trial. Even though a Daubert motion is not binding to other courts of law, if something was found untrustworthy by one court, other judges may choose to follow that precedent. Of course, a decision by an appellate court that a piece of evidence is inadmissible under Daubert would be binding on district courts within that court's jurisdiction. An evidentiary hearing on the motion may not be necessary if the court finds that it would not assist the court in ruling on any of the matters in the motion.

=== Timing ===
To attack expert testimony as inadmissible, counsel may bring pretrial motions, including motions in limine. (Note: The third circuit has emphasized the importance of conducting in limine hearings under Fed. R. Evid. 104 (resolution of preliminary questions) when making reliability determinations required by Fed. R. Evid. 702 and Daubert v. Merrell Dow Pharmaceuticals, Inc., 509 U.S. 579, 113 S. Ct. 2786, 125 L. Ed. 2d 469 (1993). See Padillas v. Stork-Gamco, Inc., 186 F.3d 412, 417 (3d Cir. 1999); Voilas v. General Motors Corp., 73 F. Supp. 2d 452, 455 (D.N.J. 1999) (not holding hearing in this case, however). See also 1 Weinstein's Federal Evidence, Ch. 104, Preliminary Questions (Matthew Bender 2d ed.); Edward J. Imwinkelried & David A. Schlueter, Federal Evidence Tactics, Ch. 1, Article I: General Provisions, § 1.04 (Matthew Bender).) The motion in limine may be brought prior to trial, although counsel may bring the motion during trial as well. A motion attacking expert testimony should be brought within a reasonable time after the close of discovery if the grounds for the objection can be reasonably anticipated. The hearing should be made well in advance of the first time a case appears on a trial calendar.

In one case where a Daubert hearing was conducted on the day of the trial, in which the district court excluded all plaintiff's expert testimony, resulting in the dismissal of all claims, the appellate court remanded the case because of multiple irregularities and a defective record of lower court proceedings. The appellate court noted that in cases that rely heavily on expert testimony, a district court should set a discovery and trial schedule that realistically provides both sides with an adequate opportunity to introduce necessary evidence. The application of Federal Rule of Evidence 702 to proposed expert testimony can often be an uncertain process and is best conducted in such a manner that litigants have a reasonable opportunity to locate experts who meet the rule's requirements.

In another case in which the defendant was apparently at fault for filing a motion to exclude expert testimony one week before the trial date, the district court denied the motion on that ground, but it advised the defendant that it might conduct its own voir dire of the expert in question before he testified. The district court preliminarily found that defendant's motion was predicated on a ruling made almost three months earlier by a district court in another state, and that defendant had shown no good cause for waiting to file the motion. The defendant ultimately lost that case, following the admission of the disputed expert testimony, and ultimately failed in its appeal.

== History ==
Prior to Daubert, relevancy in combination with the Frye standard were the dominant standards for determining the admissibility of scientific evidence in Federal courts. Frye is based on a 1923 Federal Court of appeals ruling involving the admissibility of polygraph evidence. Under Frye, the court based the admissibility of testimony regarding novel scientific evidence on whether it has "gained general acceptance in the particular field in which it belongs". The trial court's gatekeeper role in this respect is typically described as conservative, thus helping to keep pseudoscience out of the courtroom by deferring to those in the field.

In Daubert, the Supreme Court ruled that the 1923 Frye standard was superseded by the 1975 Federal Rules of Evidence, specifically Rule 702 governing expert testimony. Rule 702 originally stated (in its entirety),

If scientific, technical, or other specialized knowledge will assist the trier of fact to understand the evidence or determine a fact in issue, a witness qualified as an expert by knowledge, skill, experience, training, or education, may testify thereto in the form of an opinion or otherwise.

In Daubert, the court ruled that nothing in the Federal Rules of Evidence governing expert evidence "gives any indication that 'general acceptance' is a necessary precondition to the admissibility of scientific evidence. Moreover, such a rigid standard would be at odds with the Rules' liberal thrust and their general approach of relaxing the traditional barriers to 'opinion' testimony." By requiring experts to provide relevant opinions grounded in reliable methodology, proponents of Daubert were satisfied that these standards would result in a fair and rational resolution of the scientific and technological issues which lie at the heart of product liability adjudication. Daubert has not appeared to further the Federal Rules philosophy of admitting generally all relevant testimony, and specifically of relaxing the traditional barriers to 'opinion' testimony. The Daubert decision has instead been heralded by some political commentators as one of the most important Supreme Court decisions in imposing higher barriers for toxic tort and product liability cases, by allegedly reducing the volume of so-called junk science in the court room.

According to a 2002 RAND study, following Daubert, the percentage of expert testimony by scientists that was excluded from the courtroom significantly rose. This rise likely contributed to a doubling in successful motions for summary judgment in which 90% were against plaintiffs. Beyond this study, there is little empirical evidence of the impact of Daubert. However, some critics argue that Daubert has disrupted the balance between plaintiffs and defendants: "The exclusion of expert testimony affects plaintiffs far more than defendants because plaintiffs may then not be able to meet their required burden of proof. Furthermore, there is little point in plaintiffs going to the expense of Daubert motions to exclude defendant's experts until they know if their case will proceed. So if more experts are now being excluded, then Daubert has undoubtedly shifted the balance between plaintiffs and defendants and made it more difficult for plaintiffs to litigate successfully." Similarly, Daubert hearings can be subject to various abuses by attorneys attempting to bolster a weak case. These tactics can range from simply attempting to delay the case to driving up the costs of the litigation forcing settlement.

A different pattern has emerged in criminal cases. In criminal cases, the prosecution has the burden of proof and uses a host of forensic science methods as evidence to prove their case; but Daubert motions are rarely made by criminal defendants and when they do, they lose a majority of the challenges. Some critics of the use of unreliable science in court argue that Daubert has had beneficial effects in civil litigation, but fails to address the underlying pathologies of the forensic science system that leads to dubious verdicts in criminal cases.

Some commentators believe that Daubert caused judges to become—in the phrase used in Chief Justice William Rehnquist's dissent in Daubert—amateur scientists, many lacking the scientific literacy to effectively fulfill their role as gatekeeper of scientific evidence. Although "science for judges" forums have emerged in the wake of Daubert in order to educate judges in a variety of scientific fields, many are still skeptical about the usefulness of the Daubert standard in discerning valid science. The responsibility to assess scientific relevance has shifted from highly trained expert witnesses to judges deficient in science education. The Daubert ruling furthermore admits the possible introduction of non-peer reviewed data and conclusions. This increasingly shifts the burden of scientific judgement onto judges who have not had an education which would enable them to properly evaluate such data.

Pursuant to Rule 104(a), in Daubert the U.S. Supreme Court suggested that the following factors be considered:

1. Has the technique been tested in actual field conditions (and not just in a laboratory)?
2. Has the technique been subject to peer review and publication?
3. What is the known or potential rate of error?
4. Do standards exist for the control of the technique's operation?
5. Has the technique been generally accepted within the relevant scientific community?

The Supreme Court explicitly cautioned that the Daubert list should not be regarded by judges as "a definitive checklist or test". Yet in practice, judges have judged the admissibility of scientific evidence using the "Daubert factors" as a checklist; for example, the trial court judge in Kumho admitted to erroneously treating the factors as mandatory.

== International influence ==
The Canadian Supreme Court expressly discussed the Daubert standard in R. v. J.-L.J., [2000]. In J.-L.J., the court took a look at the development of U.S. law in this regard, noting the U.S. Supreme Court's rejection of the Frye standard and its replacement with the Daubert standard. While the court did note that "Daubert must be read in light of the specific text of the Federal Rules of Evidence, which differs from our own procedures", the court also stated in the same sentence that "the U.S. Supreme Court did list a number of factors that could be helpful in evaluating the soundness of novel science." The court then incorporated elements from the Daubert standard in their decision regarding the Quebec Court of Appeal ruling while ultimately rejecting the lower court's decision and reinstating the defendant's conviction.

Later, in 2016, the Supreme Court of Canada in White Burgess Langille Inman v. Abbott and Haliburton Co. [2015] 2 SCR 182 endorsed the parts of R v. J.-L.J. that cited Daubert, saying: "in the case of an opinion based on novel or contested science or science used for a novel purpose, the reliability of the underlying science for that purpose: J. (J.-L.), at paras. 33, 35–36 and 47". This suggests that reliability using the Daubert factors should be assessed when novel or contested science is adduced.

Additionally, in 2005, the Science and Technology Select Committee of the United Kingdom House of Commons recommended the creation of a Forensic Science Advisory Council to regulate forensic evidence in the UK and observed that:

The absence of an agreed protocol for the validation of scientific techniques prior to their being admitted in court is entirely unsatisfactory. Judges are not well-placed to determine scientific validity without input from scientists. We recommend that one of the first tasks of the Forensic Science Advisory Council be to develop a "gate-keeping" test for expert evidence. This should be done in partnership with judges, scientists and other key players in the criminal justice system, and should build on the US Daubert test.

The Law Commission for England and Wales proposed a consultation paper (No.190) to adopt a criterion like the Daubert standard to help reform the law of evidence in regards to the admissibility of scientific evidence.

== See also ==
- Frye standard
