= Expert witness =

Person whose opinion is accepted by the judge as an expert

An expert witness, particularly in common law countries such as the United Kingdom, Australia, and the United States, is a person whose opinion by virtue of education, training, certification, skills or experience, is accepted by the judge as an expert. The judge may consider the witness's specialized (scientific, technical or other) opinion about evidence or about facts before the court within the expert's area of expertise, to be referred to as an "expert opinion". Expert witnesses may also deliver "expert evidence" within the area of their expertise. Their testimony may be rebutted by testimony from other experts or by other evidence or facts.

== History ==
The forensic expert practice is an ancient profession. For example, in ancient Babylonia, midwives were used as experts in determining pregnancy, virginity and female fertility. Similarly, the Roman Empire recognized midwives, handwriting experts and land surveyors as legal experts.

The codified use of expert witnesses and the admissibility of their testimony and scientific evidence has developed significantly in the Western court system over the last 250 years. The concept of allowing an expert witness to testify in a court setting and provide opinionated evidence on the facts of other witnesses was first introduced by Lord Mansfield in the case of Folkes v. Chadd in 1782. In this particular case, the court was hearing litigation regarding the silting of Wells Harbor in Norfolk and allowed leading civil engineer, John Smeaton, to provide scientific rationale behind the proposed legislation. The decision by the English Court to allow for an expert to provide contextual background and detail on a case is often cited as the root of modern rules on expert testimony.

== Role ==
Expert witnesses are called upon in the court system to serve as an objective party to the lawsuit and never function as an advocate for one side or the other. Expert witnesses are present in litigation to explain complicated scientific issues, not to influence the jury or judge with fervor. The main responsibilities of expert witnesses are to evaluate potential problems, defects, deficiencies, or errors only when able to fully appreciate a process or system. Expert witnesses are obligated to study the processes prior to making a survey or postpone the assignment prior to potentially missing the target due to lack of specific condition understanding. They are called to testify under the assumption that all the preparation required for a competent evaluation of the process has been made.

Typically, experts are relied on for opinions on severity of injury, degree of sanity, cause of failure in a machine or other device, loss of earnings and associated benefits, care costs, and the like. In an intellectual property case an expert may be shown two music scores, book texts, or circuit boards and asked to ascertain their degree of similarity. In the majority of cases, the expert's personal relation to the defendant is considered and usually adjudged to be irrelevant.

The tribunal itself, or the judge, can in some systems call upon experts to technically evaluate a certain fact or action, in order to provide the court with a complete knowledge on the fact/action it is judging. The expertise has the legal value of an acquisition of data. The results of these experts are then compared to those by the experts of the parties.

The expert has a great responsibility, and especially in penal trials, and perjury by an expert is a severely punished crime in most countries. The use of expert witnesses is sometimes criticized in the United States because in civil trials, they are often used by both sides to advocate differing positions, and it is left up to a jury to decide which expert witness to believe. Although experts are legally prohibited from expressing their opinion of submitted evidence until after they are hired, sometimes a party can surmise beforehand, because of reputation or prior cases, that the testimony will be favorable regardless of any basis in the submitted data; such experts are commonly disparaged as "hired guns."

=== Qualifications ===
An expert witness at the time of trial is qualified by the court and must be re-qualified each time that person comes to trial for the offering of opinions. The qualification is given by each trial judge and takes place regardless of prior appearances by a particular expert witness. Expert witnesses are those whom the court has deemed qualified to speak on a topic to provide background to anyone on a lay jury.

=== Duties in United States courts ===
In high stakes cases, multiple experts across several topics are often retained by each party. Although it is still relatively rare, the court itself may also retain its own independent expert.In all cases, fees paid to an expert may not be contingent on the outcome of the case.

Expert evidence is often the most important component of many civil and criminal cases today. Fingerprint examination, blood analysis, DNA fingerprinting, and forensic firearm examination are common kinds of expert evidence heard in serious criminal cases. In civil cases, the work of accident analysis, forensic engineers, and forensic accountants is usually important, the latter to assess damages and costs in long and complex cases. Intellectual property and medical negligence cases are typical examples.

Electronic evidence has also entered the courtroom as critical forensic evidence. Audio and video evidence must be authenticated by both parties in any litigation by a forensic expert who is also an expert witness who assists the court in understanding details about that electronic evidence.

Voice-mail recordings and closed-circuit television systems produce electronic evidence often used in litigation, more so today than in the past. Video recordings of bank robberies and audio recordings of life threats are presented in court rooms by electronic expert witnesses.

=== Rules of evidence and code of procedure ===
==== Hearsay rule ====
One important rule that applies to the expert witness but not the percipient witness is the exception to the hearsay rule. A percipient witness tells only what he/she actually knows about a case and nothing more. Percipient witnesses cannot give opinions nor conjecture regarding a hypothetical set of conditions. Conversely, the court does allow an expert to testify about issues that may not be personally known by them. This allows the expert to rely upon scientific articles, discussions with colleagues on the subject, testimony read in preparation for testimony in the case and similar pieces of information not personally known to the expert.

==== Chain of custody ====
It is important that expert witnesses who handle evidence maintain a proper chain of custody such that they are able to authenticate the evidence, prove that it is what they represent it to be, when testifying at trial. Most notably in the context of a criminal prosecution, an expert witness who evaluates or examines an item pertinent to an investigation or case evaluation may add an entry to a "chain of custody" document, a form that contains the item's description, the time and date of release for all prior custodians of the item, and the time and date of release to the witness.

==== Weight of testimony ====
In the case of an expert witness, the weight of his/her evidence depends heavily on the foundation support established prior to an opinion being given. Examples include educational background, review of scholarly works, field studies and trainings which all lead up to developing a foundation of knowledge for credibility of a testimony. Before trial, all experts must prepare a report summarizing their analysis and conclusions and share the report with all other parties. This allows other parties to effectively cross-examine the expert.

== Types ==
=== Testifying experts ===
If the witness needs to testify in court, the privilege is no longer protected. The expert witness's identity and nearly all documents used to prepare the testimony will become discoverable. Usually an experienced lawyer will advise the expert not to take notes on documents because all of the notes will be available to the other party.

An expert testifying in a United States federal court must satisfy the requirements of Fed. R. Evid. 702. Generally, under Rule 702, an expert is a person with "scientific, technical, or other specialized knowledge" who can "assist the trier of fact," which is typically a jury. A witness who is being offered as an expert must first establish his or her competency in the relevant field through an examination of his or her credentials. The opposing attorney is permitted to conduct a voir dire of the witness in order to challenge that witness' qualifications. If qualified by the court, then the expert may testify "in the form of an opinion or otherwise" so long as: "(1) the testimony is based upon sufficient facts or data, (2) the testimony is the product of reliable principles and methods, and (3) the witness has applied the principles and methods reliably to the facts of the case."

Although experts can testify in any case in which their expertise is relevant, criminal cases are more likely to use forensic scientists or forensic psychologists, whereas civil cases, such as personal injury, may use forensic engineers, forensic accountants, employment consultants or care experts. Senior physicians – UK, Ireland, and Commonwealth consultants, U.S. attending physicians – are frequently used in both the civil and criminal courts.

The Federal Court of Australia has issued guidelines for experts appearing in Australian courts. This covers the format of the expert's written testimony as well as their behaviour in court. Similar procedures apply in non-court forums, such as the Australian Human Rights and Equal Opportunity Commission.

==== Educating witness ====
The educating witness teaches the fact-finder (jury or, in a bench trial, judge) about the underlying scientific theory and instrument implementing theory. This witness is an expert witness, called to elicit opinions that a theory is valid and the instruments involved are reliable. The witness must be qualified as an expert witness, which may require academic qualifications or specific training.

==== Reporting witness ====
Called after teaching witness leaves stand. Usually the laboratory technician who personally conducted the test. Witness will describe both the test and the results. When describing test, will venture opinions that proper test procedures were used and that equipment was in good working order.

=== Non-testifying experts ===
In the U.S., a party may hire experts to help them evaluate a given case. For example, a car maker may hire an experienced mechanic to decide if its cars were built to specification. This kind of expert opinion will be protected from discovery by the opposing party. In other words, if the expert finds evidence against their client, the opposite party will not automatically gain access to it. This privilege is similar to the work-product doctrine (not to be confused with attorney–client privilege).

The non-testifying expert can be present at the trial or hearing to aid the attorney in asking questions of other expert witnesses. Unlike a testifying expert, a non-testifying expert can be easily withdrawn from a case. It is also possible to change a non-testifying expert to a testifying expert before the expert disclosure date.

== United States ==
In the United States, under the Federal Rule of Evidence 702 (FRE), an expert witness must be qualified on the topic of testimony. In determining the qualifications of the expert, the FRE requires the expert have had specialized education, training, or practical experience in the subject matter relating to the case. The expert's testimony must be based on facts in evidence, and should offer opinion about the causation or correlation to the evidence in drawing a conclusion.

Experts in the U.S. typically are paid on an hourly basis for their services in investigating the facts, preparing a report, and if necessary, testifying during pre-trial discovery, or at trial. Hourly fees range from approximately $200 to $750 or more per hour, varying primarily by the expert's field of expertise, and the individual expert's qualifications and reputation. In several fields, such as handwriting analysis, where the expert compares signatures to determine the likelihood of a forgery, and medical case reviews by a physician or nurse, in which the expert goes over hospital and medical records to assess the possibility of malpractice, experts often initially charge a flat fixed fee for their initial report. As with the hourly fees discussed previously, the amount of that flat fee varies considerably based on the reviewing expert's field, experience and reputation.

In 2017 Kootenai County, Idaho paid nearly $600,000 during the trial over the killing of a Coeur d'Alene police officer, with the public defenders paying approximately $311,000 for seven experts and the prosecutors paying $270,000 for three experts. A 2021 survey conducted by SEAK, Inc., a company that helps professionals serve as expert witnesses, revealed a median hourly rate of $500, $400, and $475 for testifying in court, case preparation, and deposition respectively. As for the highest amount ever billed for a single case, the median was $24,000 and the mean was just over $62,000.

The expert's professional fee, plus his or her related expenses, is generally paid by the party retaining the expert. In some circumstance the party who prevails in the litigation may be entitled to recover the amounts paid to its expert from the losing party.

=== Scientific evidence ===
In law, scientific evidence is evidence derived from scientific knowledge or techniques. Most forensic evidence, including genetic evidence, is scientific evidence.

==== Frye test ====
The Frye test, coming from the case Frye v. United States (1923), said that admissible scientific evidence must be a result of a theory that had "general acceptance" in the scientific community. This test results in uniform decisions regarding admissibility. In particular, the judges in Frye ruled that:

Just when a scientific principle or discovery crosses the line between experimental and demonstrable stages is difficult to define. Somewhere in this twilight zone the evidential force of the principle must be recognized, and while courts will go a long way in admitting expert testimony deduced from a well-recognized scientific principle or discovery, the thing from which the deduction is made must be sufficiently established to have gained general acceptance in the particular field in which it belongs.

In 1923, the case of Frye v. United States instituted significant change to both criminal and civil law by addressing the use of expert witness testimony in conjunction with scientific testimony. In Frye v. United States, the defense team attempted to introduce both the results of a polygraph test administered to Frye to determine Frye's innocence as well as the testimony of an expert witness to verify and explain the results.

However, the court rejected the expert's testimony, ruling that: "While courts will go a long way in admitting expert testimony deduced from a well-recognized scientific principle or discovery, the thing from which the deduction is made must be sufficiently established to have gained general acceptance in the particular field in which it belongs."

Through this ruling, the judge's opinion in Frye v. United States set precedent and the standard by which expert witnesses would be utilized in the court system for decades. In the federal courts, between 1948 and 1975, Frye was cited 55 times; however, the use and application was not consistent. One of the major struggles that came out of this precedent was the application to both civil and criminal cases. Many of the courts and judges had trouble interpreting the "general acceptance" notion of a particular field in a concise and non-arbitrary manner. In 2012, courts in nine states still used the Frye standard when analyzing state expert witness rules.

The Federal Rules of Evidence

In 1975, the United States Congress issued the Federal Rules of Evidence. FRE 702 was issued to provide a standard for expert witness testimony to be upheld by the United States court system. The rule specified that the application of expert witnesses had to be attributed to a person with "scientific or technical knowledge," in conjunction with a list of qualifications that would quality one to be an expert in terms of "knowledge, skill, experience, training or education". This rule thus clarified the acceptable use of expert witnesses in both criminal and civil cases.

However, FRE 702 still left some courts in confusion. The courts who would use this new rule were confused as to whether FRE 702 served to bolster the "general acceptance" ruling in Frye or if FRE 702 was the replacement of this rule. For instance, in U.S. v. Williams (1978), the Second Circuit responded that "the applicable considerations [for expert witness testimony] are 'probativeness, materiality, and reliability of the evidence on the one side, and any tendency to mislead, prejudice or confuse the jury on the other.'" The court appeared to reject the previous precedent set by Frye. The rationale in the Williams case was later adopted by other federal courts, including the Third Circuit which adopted a "reliability" test in 1984. Meanwhile, other federal courts stuck to the Frye precedent, causing a circuit split which would not be solved until the Supreme Court set a new expert standard in Daubert v. Merrell Dow Pharmaceuticals, Inc. (1993).

==== Daubert standard ====
The Daubert standard arose out of the 1993 U.S. Supreme Court case Daubert v. Merrell Dow Pharmaceuticals, Inc. It provides four factors that courts ought to consider when determining whether expert testimony is admissible under the Federal Rules of Evidence:

1. "Whether the expert's theory or technique can be (and has been) tested"
2. "Whether the theory or technique has an acceptable known or potential rate of error"
3. "The existence and maintenance of standards controlling the technique's operation"
4. "Whether the theory or technique has attained 'general acceptance'"

In 2012, twenty-two states used the Daubert test when analyzing their own expert witness rules.

== United Kingdom ==
=== England and Wales ===
In England and Wales, under the Civil Procedure Rules (CPR), an expert witness is required to be independent and address his or her expert report to the court. A witness may be jointly instructed by both sides if the parties agree to this, especially in cases where the liability is relatively small.

Under the CPR, expert witnesses may be instructed to produce a joint statement detailing points of agreement and disagreement to assist the court or tribunal. The meeting is held quite independently of instructing lawyers, and often assists in resolution of a case, especially if the experts review and modify their opinions. When this happens, substantial trial costs can be saved when the parties to a dispute agree to a settlement. In most systems, the trial (or the procedure) can be suspended in order to allow the experts to study the case and produce their results. More frequently, meetings of experts occur before trial. Experts charge a professional fee which is paid by the party commissioning the report (both parties for joint instructions) although the report is addressed to the court. The fee must not be contingent on the outcome of the case. Expert witnesses may be subpoenaed (issued with a witness summons), although this is normally a formality to avoid court date clashes.

=== Scotland ===
In Scots law, Davie v Magistrates of Edinburgh (1953) provides authority that where a witness has particular knowledge or skills in an area being examined by the court, and has been called to court in order to elaborate on that area for the benefit of the court, that witness may give evidence of his/her opinion on that area.

== Comparison of English and US law ==
=== Similarities ===
==== Purpose ====
- England and Wales: Expert evidence is to furnish the judge or jury with necessary scientific criteria for testing the accuracy of their conclusions
- United States: Expert evidence is admissible on the basis that the knowledge will help the trier of fact to understand the evidence or to determine a fact in issue

==== Qualification ====
- England and Wales: Expert witness is qualified to give evidence, where the court itself cannot form an opinion and special study, skill or experience is required for the purpose
- United States: An expert witness is qualified by knowledge, skill, experience or education

==== Admissibility of evidence ====
- England and Wales: Expert evidence must be provided in as much detail as possible in order to convince the judge that the expert's opinions are well founded
- United States: Expert testimony is to be based on sufficient facts, data or products of a credible source of test and tried principles and methods

=== Differences ===
==== Conduct ====
- England and Wales: Expert's "duties to the Court override any obligation to the person from whom they have received instructions or have been paid by"
- United States: Expert's duty is not formally defined under the Federal Rules of Civil Procedure / Evidence

==== Depositions ====
- England and Wales: Expert evidence is examined before the judge (or arbitrator)
- United States: Expert evidence can be compelled to deposition

==== Ultimate issue ====
- England and Wales: Expert opinion on the ultimate issue is not admissible
- United States: Expert opinion on the ultimate issue is admissible

== Turkey ==
During a Erdoğan-Gollum comparison trial, a panel of expert witnesses had to decide on the character of Gollum.

== See also ==
- Ambush defence
- Daubert standard and Daubert v. Merrell Dow Pharmaceuticals, Inc.
- Death of an Expert Witness - a novel
- Employment consultant
- Expert shopping
- Forensic accountant
- Forensic economics
- Forensic engineering
- Forensic science
- Forensic psychology
- Forensic video analysis
- Frye standard of evidence
- Gibson's law
- In limine
- Jones v Kaney — English caselaw abolishing witness immunity from civil action for negligence
- Kumho Tire Co. v. Carmichael
- Questioned document examination
- R v Mohan — Canadian case law establishing qualifications for expert witnesses
- Saisie-contrefaçon
- Traffic collision reconstruction
- Ultimate issue

== Bibliography ==
- Bronstein, DA, Law for the Expert Witness, CRC Press,2nd Ed (1999).
- Dwyer, D, The Judicial Assessment of Expert Evidence, Cambridge University Press (2008).
- Federal Judicial Center; National Research Council, eds. (2011). Reference Manual on Scientific Evidence (3rd. ed.). Washington, DC: National Academies Press. doi:10.17226/13163. hdl:2027/hvd.32044032506586. ISBN 978-0-309-21421-6.
- Jasanoff, Sheila, Science at the Bar: Law, Science, and Technology in America (Cambridge, Massachusetts: Harvard University Press, 1997).
- Reynolds, MP and King, PSD, The Expert Witness and his Evidence, Blackwell (1992).
- Smith, D, Being an Effective Expert Witness, Thames Publishing (1993).
