= General Electric Co. v. Joiner =

- Supreme Court of the United States

Argued Oct 14, 1997 Decided Dec 15, 1997
- Full case name: General Electric Company v. Robert Joiner
- Docket no.: 96–188
- Citations: 522 U.S. 136 (more) 118 S. Ct. 512; 139 L. Ed. 2d 508; 1997 U.S. LEXIS 7503

Holding
- Abuse of discretion—the standard ordinarily applicable to review of evidentiary rulings—is the proper standard by which to review a district court's decision to admit or exclude expert scientific evidence.

Court membership
- Chief Justice William Rehnquist Associate Justices John P. Stevens · Sandra Day O'Connor; Antonin Scalia · Anthony Kennedy; David Souter · Clarence Thomas; Ruth Bader Ginsburg · Stephen Breyer

Case opinions
- Majority: Rehnquist, joined by unanimous (parts I, II); O'Connor, Scalia, Kennedy, Souter, Thomas, Ginsburg, Breyer (part III)
- Concurrence: Breyer
- Concur/dissent: Stevens

Laws applied
- Federal Rules of Evidence

General Electric Co. v. Joiner, 522 U.S. 136 (1997), was a Supreme Court of the United States case between Robert Joiner and General Electric Co. that concerned whether the abuse of discretion standard is the correct standard an appellate court should apply in reviewing a trial court's decision to admit or exclude expert testimony. The case is notable for helping articulate the Daubert standard.

== Facts ==
Joiner had worked around transformers as an electrician since 1973. During his electrical work, the dielectric fluid used as a coolant for the transformers got into his eyes and mouth, and stuck to his arms and hands. In 1983, it was discovered that the fluid in some of its transformers contained toxic PCBs. Later, in 1991, Joiner was diagnosed with small cell lung cancer. He sued General Electric, the manufacturer of the transformers and dielectric fluid. Joiner had been a smoker for eight years and there was a history of lung cancer in his family. Joiner alleged that his exposure to PCBs "promoted" his cancer. He claimed that, had it not been for his exposure to these substances, his cancer would not have developed for many years, if at all. General Electric claimed there was no evidence that Joiner suffered significant exposure to PCBs and that there was no admissible scientific evidence that PCBs promoted Joiner's cancer.

== Holding ==
General Electric removed the case to federal court and then moved for summary judgment. The district court ruled that there was no evidence that Joiner had been exposed to PCBs. The district court also held that testimony of Joiner's experts failed to show that there was a link between exposure to PCB and small cell cancer. The case was dismissed. Joiner appealed the ruling and the court of appeals reversed. The Supreme Court of the United States granted certiorari and, after review, reversed the appellate court's ruling and affirmed the district court's ruling.
