= Metaphysical solipsism =

Variety of philosophical idealism

In metaphysics, metaphysical solipsism is the variety of idealism which asserts that nothing exists externally to this one mind, and since this mind is the whole of reality then the "external world" was never anything more than an idea. It can also be expressed by the assertion "there is nothing external to these present experiences", in other words, no reality exists beyond whatever is presently being cognized by that one mind. The aforementioned definition of solipsism entails the non-existence of anything presently unperceived including the external world, causation, other minds (including God's mind or a subconscious mind), the past or future, and a subject of experience. Despite their ontological non-existence, these entities may nonetheless be said to "exist" as useful descriptions of the various experiences and thoughts that constitute 'this' mind.

Metaphysical solipsism differs from Epistemological solipsism in that, Metaphysical Solipsism, and therefore one adhering to it as a position, states that nothing exists externally to this one mind, while Epistemological Solipsism, states that nothing can be known for certain to exist externally to this one mind.

== Overview ==
The solipsistic self is described by Ludwig Wittgenstein in his Tractatus Logico-Philosophicus (TLP): "The self of solipsism shrinks to a point without extension and there remains the reality co-ordinated with it" (TLP 5.64).

There are weaker versions of metaphysical solipsism, such as Caspar Hare's egocentric presentism (or perspectival realism), in which other persons are conscious but their experiences are simply not present. Similarly, J. J. Valberg develops a concept of one's personal horizon and discusses how it is in a sense the (preeminent) horizon, stating that "we are all solipsists" in his sense of solipsism. Vincent Conitzer is another philosopher who has discussed similar ideas, and has argued that the existence of a metaphysical "I" that is privileged from other perspectives is related to the A-theory of time.

Christian List argues that there exists a "quadrilemma" within the metaphysics of consciousness, due to the existence of first-person perspectives and Benj Hellie's vertiginous question. According to List, at least one of the four following metaphysical claims must be false: 'first-person realism', 'non-solipsism', 'non-fragmentation', and 'one world'. Thus, believing in first-person realism and a single, unfragmented world must imply that solipsism is true.

== Arguments for metaphysical solipsism ==
The argument in favor of solipsism:

- The only thing one has direct access to is the contents of one's own mind (one's mental states). What one knows most certainly are one's mental states – one's thoughts, experiences, emotions, and so on.
- Just because one sees an object does not mean that the object exists. One could be dreaming or hallucinating. There is no direct conceptual or logically necessary link between the mental and the physical.
- The experiences of a given person are necessarily private to that person. The contents of one's mind are the only things one has direct access to. One cannot get ‘outside’ of one's mind to encounter any other objects including other persons. Other minds are even more removed.

The basic form of the argument:

- Person's mental states are the only things they have access to.
- One cannot conclude the existence of anything outside of their mental states.
  - Therefore, only their mental states exist.

== Criticism of metaphysical solipsism ==
The basic argument for solipsism is that, because the mind can not conclude the existence of anything external, therefore nothing external exists, only the appearance of it. One reason for the lack of support of this philosophical position is how strange it would be for a solipsist to preach solipsism – as if to convince everyone around them that they are purely a figment of the author's own imagination. The very idea of communicating philosophical ideas would be arbitrary to a true solipsist, as according to them, there is no other mind with whom they would communicate their beliefs.

Russell commented, on the same theme:

"As against solipsism, it is to be said, in the first place, that it is psychologically impossible to believe, and is rejected in fact even by those who mean to accept it. I once received a letter from an eminent logician, Mrs. Christine Ladd-Franklin, saying that she was a solipsist, and was surprised that there were no others. Coming from a logician, this surprised me. The fact that I cannot believe something does not prove that it is false, but it does prove that I am insincere and frivolous if I pretend to believe it." (Russell, p. 180).

This criticism commits the fallacy of argumentum ad lapidem by suggesting that solipsism, being absurd, should be dismissed. It does not take into account the possibility that the concept of self is a product of the imagination, which could explain the desire to advocate for solipsism.

== See also ==
- Actual idealism
- Brain in a vat
- Cartesian skepticism
- Epistemological solipsism
- Methodological solipsism
