= Daubert v. Merrell Dow Pharmaceuticals, Inc. =

Daubert v. Merrell Dow Pharmaceuticals
- Supreme Court of the United States

Argued March 30, 1993 Decided June 28, 1993
- Full case name: William Daubert, et ux., etc., et al., Petitioners v. Merrell Dow Pharmaceuticals, Inc.
- Docket no.: 92-102
- Citations: 509 U.S. 579 (more) 113 S. Ct. 2786; 125 L. Ed. 2d 469; 1993 U.S. LEXIS 4408; 61 U.S.L.W. 4805; 27 U.S.P.Q.2D (BNA) 1200; CCH Prod. Liab. Rep. ¶ 13,494; 93 Cal. Daily Op. Service 4825; 93 Daily Journal DAR 8148; 23 ELR 20979; 7 Fla. L. Weekly Fed. S 632

Case history
- Prior: Summary judgment granted to defendants, 727 F.Supp. 570 (S.D. Cal. 1989); affirmed, 951 F.2d 1128 (9th Cir. 1991); certiorari granted, 506 U.S. 914 (1992)

Holding
- The Federal Rules of Evidence govern the admission of scientific evidence in a trial held in federal court. They require the trial judge to act as a gatekeeper before admitting the evidence, determining that the evidence is scientifically valid and relevant to the case at hand.

Court membership
- Chief Justice William Rehnquist Associate Justices Byron White · Harry Blackmun; John P. Stevens · Sandra Day O'Connor; Antonin Scalia · Anthony Kennedy; David Souter · Clarence Thomas

Case opinions
- Majority: Blackmun, joined by White, O'Connor, Scalia, Kennedy, Souter, Thomas
- Concur/dissent: Rehnquist, joined by Stevens

Laws applied
- Federal Rules of Evidence 104(a), 702, 703
- This case overturned a previous ruling or rulings
- Frye v. United States (1923)

Daubert v. Merrell Dow Pharmaceuticals, Inc. (/ˈdɔːbərt/ DAW-bərt), 509 U.S. 579 (1993), is a United States Supreme Court case determining the standard for admitting expert testimony in federal courts. In Daubert, the Court held that the enactment of the Federal Rules of Evidence implicitly overturned the Frye standard; the standard that the Court articulated is referred to as the Daubert standard.

== Facts ==
Jason Daubert and Eric Schuller were born with serious birth defects. They and their parents sued Merrell Dow Pharmaceuticals Inc., a subsidiary of Dow Chemical Company, in a California District Court, claiming that the drug Bendectin had caused the birth defects. Merrell Dow removed the case to federal court, and then moved for summary judgment because their expert submitted documents showing that no published scientific study demonstrated a link between Bendectin and birth defects in humans. Daubert and Schuller submitted expert evidence of their own that suggested that Bendectin could cause birth defects. Daubert and Schuller's evidence, however, was based on in vitro and in vivo animal studies, pharmacological studies, and reanalysis of other published studies, and these methodologies had not yet gained acceptance within the general scientific community.

The district court granted summary judgment for Merrell Dow, and Daubert and Schuller appealed to the Ninth Circuit. The Ninth Circuit found the district court correctly granted summary judgment because the plaintiffs' proffered evidence had not yet been accepted as a reliable technique by scientists who had had an opportunity to scrutinize and verify the methods used by those scientists. Furthermore, the Ninth Circuit was skeptical of the fact that the plaintiffs' evidence appeared to be generated in preparation for litigation. Without their proffered evidence, the Ninth Circuit doubted that the plaintiffs could prove at a trial that the Bendectin had caused their birth defects.

== Majority opinion ==
=== Prior law ===
In a 1923 case, Frye v. United States, 293 F. 1013 (D.C. Cir. 1923), the D.C. Circuit held that evidence could be admitted in court only if "the thing from which the deduction is made" is "sufficiently established to have gained general acceptance in the particular field in which it belongs." Frye dealt with a systolic blood pressure deception test, a "crude precursor" to the polygraph. In 1923, this blood pressure test was not widely accepted among scientists, and so the Frye court ruled it could not be used in court. Over the years, scholars disputed the proper scope and application of the Frye test.

The plaintiffs successfully argued that after Congress adopted the Federal Rules of Evidence in 1975, Frye was no longer the governing standard for admitting scientific evidence in trials held in federal court. The Supreme Court agreed and had already ruled that where common law rules conflicted with provisions of the Rules, the enactment of the Rules had the effect of supplanting the common law. Frye had remained part of the federal common law of evidence because it was decided almost 50 years before the Rules were enacted, but the text of the Rules did not suggest a congressional intent to keep the Frye rule, so the Court reasoned that Frye was no longer the rule.

Rule 702 of the Federal Rules of Evidence provides (in part):

If scientific, technical, or other specialized knowledge will assist the trier of fact to understand the evidence or to determine a fact in issue, a witness qualified as an expert by knowledge, skill, experience, training, or education, may testify thereto in the form of an opinion or otherwise...

The text of Rule 702 did not make admissibility of expert testimony depend on general acceptance, and there was no evidence that Congress intended to incorporate a general acceptance standard into Rule 702. "Given the Rules' permissive backdrop and their inclusion of a specific rule on expert testimony that does not mention 'general acceptance,' the assertion that the Rules somehow assimilated Frye is unconvincing. Frye made 'general acceptance' the exclusive test for admitting expert testimony. That austere standard, absent from, and incompatible with, the Federal Rules of Evidence, should not be applied in federal trials."

=== The standard governing expert testimony ===
Three key provisions of the Rules governed admission of expert testimony in court. First, scientific knowledge, meaning that the testimony must be scientific in nature and must be grounded in "knowledge." Since science cannot claim absolute certainty, instead representing "a process for proposing and refining theoretical explanations about the world that are subject to further testing and refinement," Rule 702 defines "scientific knowledge" as arising from the scientific method.

Second, the scientific knowledge must assist the trier of fact in understanding the evidence or determining a fact in issue in the case. The trier of fact is often either a jury or a judge; but other fact finders may exist within the contemplation of the federal rules of evidence. To be helpful to the trier of fact, there must be a "valid scientific connection to the pertinent inquiry as a prerequisite to admissibility." For example, although it is within the purview of scientific knowledge, knowing whether the moon was full on a given night does not typically assist the trier of fact in knowing whether a person was sane when he or she committed a given act.

Third, the Rules expressly provided that the judge would make the threshold determination regarding whether certain scientific knowledge would indeed assist the trier of fact in the manner contemplated by Rule 702. "This entails a preliminary assessment of whether the reasoning or methodology underlying the testimony is scientifically valid and of whether that reasoning or methodology properly can be applied to the facts in issue." This preliminary assessment can turn on whether something has been tested, whether an idea has been subjected to scientific peer review or published in scientific journals, the rate of error involved in the technique, and even general acceptance, among other things. It focuses on methodology and principles, not the ultimate conclusions generated.

The Court stressed that the new standard under Rule 702 was rooted in the judicial process and intended to be distinct and separate from the search for scientific truth. "Scientific conclusions are subject to perpetual revision. Law, on the other hand, must resolve disputes finally and quickly. The scientific project is advanced by broad and wide-ranging consideration of a multitude of hypotheses, for those that are incorrect will eventually be shown to be so, and that in itself is an advance." Rule 702 was intended to resolve legal disputes and, thus, had to be interpreted in conjunction with other rules of evidence and with other legal means of ending those disputes.

Cross examination within the adversary process is adequate to help legal decision makers arrive at efficient ends to disputes. "We recognize that, in practice, a gatekeeping role for the judge, no matter how flexible, inevitably on occasion will prevent the jury from learning of authentic insights and innovations. That, nevertheless, is the balance that is struck by Rules of Evidence designed not for the exhaustive search for cosmic understanding but for the particularized resolution of legal disputes."

== Aftermath ==
The Supreme Court reversed, and remanded the case to the Ninth Circuit Court of Appeals. On remand, the court analyzed the case under the new standard, upholding the district court's original grant of summary judgement for the defendant.

After Daubert, it was expected that the range of scientific opinion evidence used in court would be expanded. However, courts have strictly applied the standards in Daubert, and it has generally been successful in excluding "junk science" or "pseudoscience", as well as new or experimental techniques and research that the decision might have been expected to deem admissible.

Discerning between science and "pseudoscience" was the theme of a book by Karl Popper whose summary was quoted in Daubert: "the criterion of the scientific status of a theory is its falsifiability, or refutability, or testability." The book, Conjectures and Refutations: The Growth of Scientific Knowledge (5th ed. 1989), pp. 34–57, explains how psychology is more like astrology than astronomy because it does not make predictions about an individual which are falsifiable. He wrote that "the impressive thing about" Einstein's predictions "is the risk involved...If observation shows that the predicted effect is definitely absent, then the theory is simply refuted." But "it was impossible to describe a human behaviour" which would be accepted as proving psychology false.

The considerations in Daubert do not all have to be met for the evidence to be admitted. It is necessary only that the majority of the tests be substantially complied with.

The principle in Daubert was expanded in Kumho Tire Co. v. Carmichael (1999), where the evidence in question was from a technician and not a scientist. The technician was going to testify that the only possible cause of a tire blowout must have been a manufacturing defect, as he could not determine any other possible cause. The United States Court of Appeals for the Eleventh Circuit had admitted the evidence on the assumption that Daubert did not apply to technical evidence, only scientific evidence. The Supreme Court reversed, saying that the standard in Daubert could apply to merely technical evidence, but that in this case, the evidence of the proposed expert did not meet the standard.

== See also ==
- Bendectin
- Daubert Standard
- Expert witness
- Kumho Tire Co. v. Carmichael (1995)
- Merrell Dow Pharmaceuticals Inc. v. Thompson (1986)
- List of United States Supreme Court cases, volume 509
- List of United States Supreme Court cases by the Rehnquist Court
