= Hyperemesis gravidarum =

Excessive vomitings during pregnancy

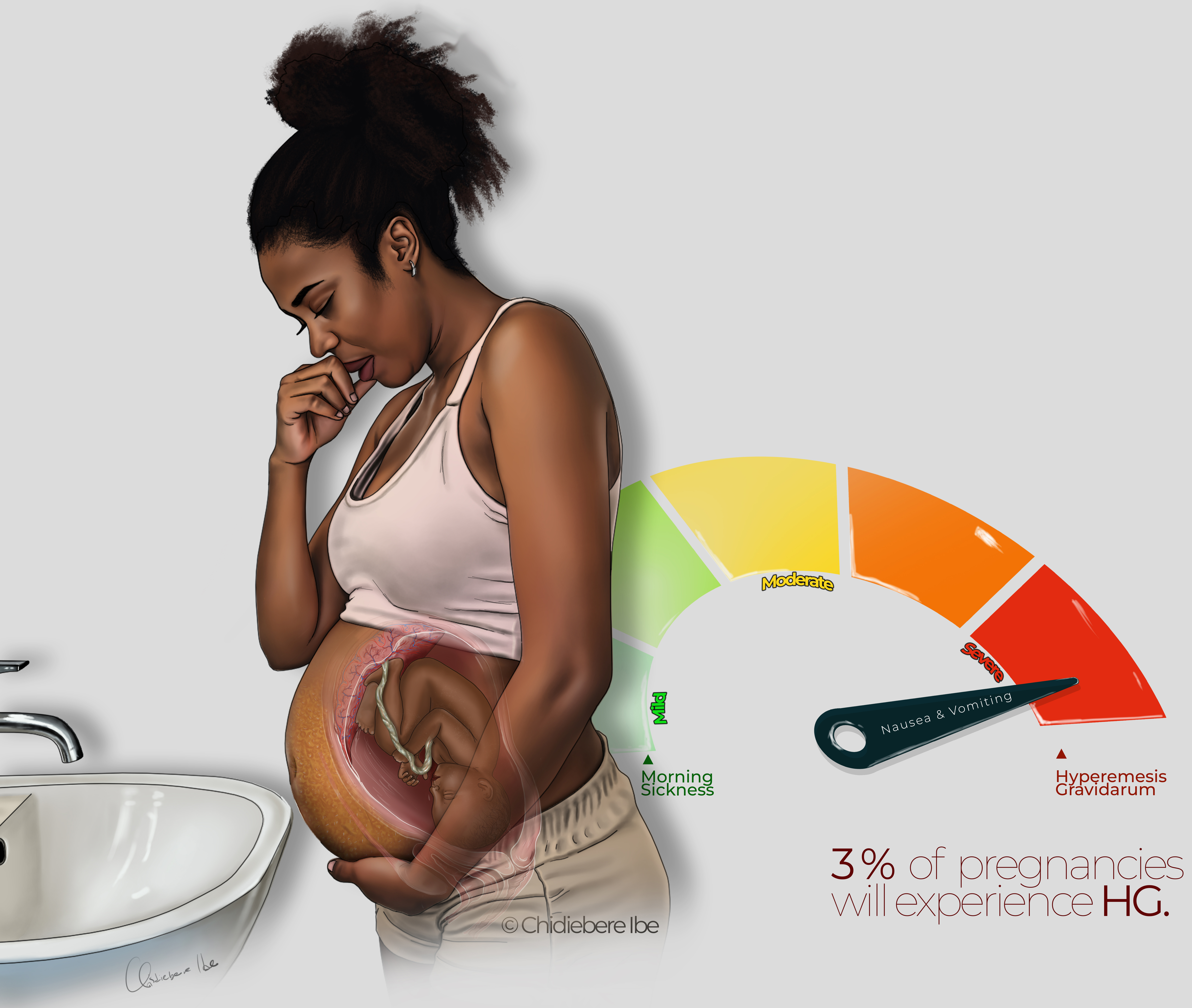
- Specialty: Obstetrics, gastroenterology
- Symptoms: Nausea and vomiting such that weight loss and dehydration occur
- Duration: Often gets better but may last entire pregnancy
- Causes: Unknown
- Risk factors: First pregnancy, multiple pregnancy, obesity, prior or family history of hyperemesis gravidarum, trophoblastic disorder
- Diagnostic method: Based on symptoms
- Differential diagnosis: Urinary tract infection, high thyroid levels
- Treatment: Drinking fluids, bland diet, intravenous fluids
- Medication: Pyridoxine, metoclopramide
- Frequency: ~1% of pregnant women

Hyperemesis gravidarum (HG) is a pregnancy complication that is characterized by severe nausea, vomiting, weight loss, and possibly dehydration. Feeling faint may also occur. It is considered a more severe form of morning sickness. Symptoms often get better after the 20th week of pregnancy but may last the entire pregnancy duration.

The exact causes of hyperemesis gravidarum are unknown. Risk factors include the first pregnancy, multiple pregnancy, obesity, prior or family history of HG, and trophoblastic disorder. A December 2023 study published in Nature indicated a link between HG and abnormally high levels of the hormone GDF15, as well as increased sensitivity to that specific hormone.

Diagnosis is usually made based on the observed signs and symptoms. HG has been technically defined as more than three episodes of vomiting per day, such that weight loss of 5% or three kilograms has occurred and ketones are present in the urine. Other potential causes of the symptoms should be excluded, including urinary tract infection, and an overactive thyroid.

Treatment includes drinking fluids and a bland diet. Recommendations may include electrolyte-replacement drinks, thiamine, and a higher protein diet. Some people require intravenous fluids. With respect to medications, pyridoxine or metoclopramide are preferred. Prochlorperazine, dimenhydrinate, ondansetron (sold under the brand-name Zofran) or corticosteroids may be used if these are not effective. Hospitalization may be required due to the severe symptoms associated. Psychotherapy may improve outcomes. Evidence for acupressure is poor.

While vomiting in pregnancy has been described as early as 2000 BCE, the first clear medical description of HG was in 1852, by Paul Antoine Dubois. HG is estimated to affect 0.3–2.0% of pregnant women, although some sources say the figure can be as high as 3%. While previously known as a common cause of death in pregnancy, with proper treatment this is now very rare. Those affected have a lower risk of miscarriage but a higher risk of premature birth. Some pregnant women choose to have an abortion due to HG symptoms.

== Signs and symptoms ==
When vomiting is severe, it may result in the following:

- Loss of 5% or more of pre-pregnancy body weight
- Dehydration, causing ketosis, and constipation
- Nutritional disorders, such as vitamin B_{1} (thiamine) deficiency, vitamin B_{6} (pyridoxine) deficiency or vitamin B_{12} (cobalamin) deficiency
- Metabolic imbalances such as metabolic ketoacidosis or thyrotoxicosis
- Physical and emotional stress
- Difficulty with activities of daily living

Symptoms can be aggravated by hunger, fatigue, prenatal vitamins (especially those containing iron), and diet. Many women with HG are extremely sensitive to odors in their environment; certain smells may exacerbate symptoms. Excessive salivation, also known as sialorrhea gravidarum, is another symptom experienced by some women.

Hyperemesis gravidarum tends to occur in the first trimester of pregnancy and lasts significantly longer than morning sickness. While most women will experience near-complete relief of morning sickness symptoms near the beginning of their second trimester, some people with HG will experience severe symptoms until they give birth to their baby, and sometimes even after giving birth.

A small percentage rarely vomit, but the nausea still causes most (if not all) of the same issues that hyperemesis with vomiting does.

=== Complications ===
==== Pregnant woman ====
Failure to treat or inadequate treatment of HG can lead to one or more of the following:

- anemia
- hyponatremia
- Wernicke's encephalopathy
- kidney failure
- central pontine myelinolysis
- coagulopathy
- atrophy
- Mallory–Weiss tears
- hypoglycemia
- jaundice
- malnutrition
- pneumomediastinum
- rhabdomyolysis
- deconditioning
- deep vein thrombosis
- pulmonary embolism
- splenic avulsion
- vasospasms of cerebral arteries

Depression and post-traumatic stress disorder are common secondary complications of HG, and emotional support can be beneficial.

==== Infant ====
The effects of HG on the fetus are mainly due to electrolyte imbalances caused by HG in the mother. Women with severe hyperemesis who gain less than 7 kilograms (15 lb) during pregnancy tend to have newborns with lower birth weight or are smaller for gestational age. They also tend to give birth before 37 weeks of gestation.

In contrast, infants of women with hyperemesis who have a pregnancy weight gain of more than 7 kilograms (15 lb) appear similar to infants from uncomplicated pregnancies. There is no significant difference in the neonatal death rate in infants born to mothers with HG compared to infants born to mothers who do not have HG. Children born to mothers with undertreated HG have a fourfold increase in neurobehavioral diagnoses.

== Causes ==
Though the exact cause of HG is unknown, there are numerous theories. It is thought that HG is caused by a combination of factors, many of which may vary between women, some of which include a genetic predisposition. Women with family members who have had HG are more likely to develop the disease.

One factor is an adverse reaction to the hormonal changes of pregnancy, in particular, elevated levels of beta human chorionic gonadotropin (β-hCG). This theory would also explain why hyperemesis gravidarum is most frequently encountered in the first trimester (often around 8–12 weeks of gestation), as β-hCG levels are highest at that time and decline afterward. Another postulated cause of HG is an increase in maternal levels of estrogens (decreasing intestinal motility and gastric emptying leading to nausea/vomiting).

== Pathophysiology ==
Morning sickness

Although the pathophysiology of HG is unclear, one of the most commonly accepted theories suggests that levels of β-hCG are associated with it. Leptin, a hormone that inhibits hunger, may also play a role.

Possible pathophysiological processes involved are summarized in the following table:

Source	Cause	Pathophysiology
Placenta	β-hCG	Distention of the gastrointestinal tract; Crossover with TSH, causing gestational thyrotoxicosis
Placenta; Corpus luteum	Estrogen; Progesterone	Decreased gut mobility; Elevated liver enzymes; Decreased lower esophageal sphincter pressure; Increased levels of sex steroids in hepatic portal system
Gastrointestinal tract	Helicobacter pylori; Gastroesophageal reflux disease (GERD)	Increased steroid levels in circulation; Relaxing of the lower esophagal sphincter

== Diagnosis ==
Hyperemesis gravidarum is considered a diagnosis of exclusion. Criteria for diagnosing HG in a patient generally includes vomiting that results in significant dehydration and weight loss (at least 5% of the patients pre-pregnancy weight). Urinalysis is usually performed, and blood samples may be taken to check for ketonuria, electrolyte imbalances, and complete blood counts, all of which could indicate HG or prompt an alternative diagnosis.

Women experiencing hyperemesis gravidarum often are dehydrated and lose weight despite efforts to eat. Similar to the onset of standard bouts of morning sickness, the nausea and vomiting with hyperemesis typically starts between 5 and 6 weeks into pregnancy.

=== Differential diagnosis ===
Diagnoses to be ruled out include the following:

Type	Differential diagnoses
Infections (usually accompanied by fever or associated neurological symptoms)	Urinary tract infection; Hepatitis; Meningitis; Gastroenteritis
Gastrointestinal disorders (usually accompanied by abdominal pain)	Appendicitis; Cholecystitis; Pancreatitis; Fatty liver; Peptic ulcer; Small bowel obstruction
Metabolic	Thyrotoxicosis (common in the Asian subcontinent); Addison's disease; Diabetic ketoacidosis; Hyperparathyroidism
Drugs	Antibiotics; Iron supplements
Gestational trophoblastic diseases (rule out with urine β-hCG)	Molar pregnancy; Choriocarcinoma

=== Investigations ===
Common investigations include blood urea nitrogen (BUN) and electrolytes, liver function tests, urinalysis, and thyroid function tests. Hematological investigations include hematocrit levels, which are usually raised in HG due to hemoconcentration. An ultrasound scan may be needed to know gestational status and to exclude molar or partial molar pregnancy.

== Management ==
Dry, bland food and oral rehydration are first-line treatments. Due to the potential for severe dehydration and other complications, HG is treated as an emergency. If conservative dietary measures fail, more extensive treatment such as the use of antiemetic medications and intravenous rehydration may be required. If oral nutrition is insufficient, intravenous nutritional support may be needed. For women who require hospital admission, thromboembolic stockings or low-molecular-weight heparin may be used as measures to prevent the formation of a blood clot.

=== Intravenous fluids ===
Intravenous (IV) hydration often includes supplementation of electrolytes, as persistent vomiting frequently leads to a deficiency. Likewise, supplementation for lost thiamine (vitamin B_{1}) must be considered to reduce the risk of Wernicke's encephalopathy. A and B vitamins are depleted within two weeks, so extended malnutrition indicates a need for evaluation and supplementation. In addition, electrolyte levels should be monitored and supplemented; of particular concern are sodium and potassium.

After IV rehydration is completed, patients typically begin to tolerate frequent small liquid or bland meals. After rehydration, treatment focuses on managing symptoms to allow normal intake of food. However, cycles of hydration and dehydration can occur, making continuing care necessary. Home care is available in the form of a peripherally inserted central catheter (PICC) line for hydration and nutrition. Home treatment is often less expensive and reduces the risk for a hospital-acquired infection compared with long-term or repeated hospitalizations.

=== Medications ===
Several antiemetics are effective and safe in pregnancy including: pyridoxine/doxylamine, antihistamines (such as diphenhydramine), and phenothiazines (such as promethazine). Concerning effectiveness, it is unknown if one is superior to another for relieving nausea or vomiting. Limited evidence from published clinical trials suggests the use of medications to treat hyperemesis gravidarum.

While pyridoxine/doxylamine, a combination of vitamin B_{6} and doxylamine, is effective in nausea and vomiting of pregnancy, some have questioned its effectiveness in HG.

Ondansetron may be beneficial; however, there are some concerns regarding association with cleft palate, and there is little high-quality data. Metoclopramide is also used and relatively well tolerated. Evidence for the use of corticosteroids is weak; there is some evidence that corticosteroid use in pregnant women may slightly increase the risk of cleft lip and cleft palate in the infant and may suppress fetal adrenal activity. However, hydrocortisone and prednisolone are inactivated in the placenta and may be used in the treatment of hyperemesis gravidarum after 12 weeks.

Medicinal cannabis has been used to treat pregnancy-associated hyperemesis.

=== Nutritional support ===
Women not responding to IV rehydration and medication may require nutritional support. Patients might receive total parenteral nutrition (intravenous feeding via a PICC line) or enteral nutrition (via a nasogastric tube or a nasojejunal tube). There is only limited evidence from trials to support the use of vitamin B_{6} to improve outcomes. An oversupply of nutrition (hyperalimentation) may be necessary in certain cases to help maintain volume requirements and allow weight gain. A physician might also prescribe Vitamin B_{1} (to prevent Wernicke's encephalopathy) and folic acid.

=== Alternative medicine ===
Acupuncture (both with P6 and traditional method) is ineffective. The use of ginger products may be helpful, but evidence of effectiveness is limited and inconsistent.

== Epidemiology ==
Vomiting is a common condition affecting about 50% of pregnant women, with another 25% having nausea. However, the incidence of HG is only 0.3–1.5%. After preterm labor, hyperemesis gravidarum is the second most common reason for hospital admission during the first half of pregnancy. Factors such as infection with Helicobacter pylori, a rise in thyroid hormone production, low age, low body mass index before pregnancy, multiple pregnancies, molar pregnancies, and a history of hyperemesis gravidarum have been associated with the development of HG.

== History ==
Thalidomide was prescribed for treatment of HG in Europe until it was recognized that thalidomide is teratogenic and is a cause of phocomelia in neonates.

=== Etymology ===
Hyperemesis gravidarum is from the Greek hyper-, meaning excessive, and emesis, meaning vomiting, and the Latin gravidarum, the feminine genitive plural form of an adjective, here used as a noun, meaning "pregnant [woman]". Therefore, hyperemesis gravidarum means "excessive vomiting of pregnant women".

== Notable cases ==
Author Charlotte Brontë is often thought to have had hyperemesis gravidarum. She died in 1855, four months pregnant, having been affected by intractable nausea and vomiting throughout her pregnancy, and was unable to tolerate food or even water.

Catherine, Princess of Wales was hospitalised due to hyperemesis gravidarum during her first pregnancy, and was treated for the same condition during the subsequent two.

Comedian Amy Schumer cancelled the remainder of her tour due to hyperemesis gravidarum.

== Society and culture ==
In previous centuries, the cause was unknown, and various false claims were made, such as severe vomiting being caused by the woman's rejection of femininity, a manifestation of a subconscious desire to terminate the pregnancy, or being an attention-seeking behavior. These erroneous beliefs led to various abusive practices, such as isolating them from their friends and family, or leaving severely ill women to lie in the vomit when they were too weak to clean themselves, which have since been condemned by healthcare professionals and medical organizations such as the College of French Gynecologists and Obstetricians. The HER Foundation is grassroots network of HG survivors and experts.

Hyperemesis gravidarum is estimated to cost US$3 billion per year for hospitalization costs alone , not including the direct medical costs of additional outpatient medical appointments, prescription drugs, and home health care, or any indirect costs such as lost work. Between 2007 and 2023, the US National Institutes of Health approved six research grants to study hyperemesis gravidarum, with a total of US$2.1 million in research funding.
