= 1977 Silver Jubilee and Queen's Birthday Honours (Australia) =

Honours in Australia in 1977

The 1977 Silver Jubilee and Birthday Honours for Australia were appointments to recognise and reward good works by citizens of Australia and other nations that contribute to Australia to celebrate Her Majesty's Silver Jubilee and birthday. The Silver Jubilee and Birthday Honours were announced on 14 June 1977 in Australia.

The recipients of honours are displayed as they were styled before their new honour and arranged by honour with grades and then divisions i.e. Civil, Diplomatic and Military as appropriate.

== Appointments ==
- His Royal Highness The Prince of Wales to be Colonel-in-Chief, Royal Australian Armoured Corps.
- Her Royal Highness The Princess Anne to be Colonel-in-Chief, Royal Australian Corps of Signals.
- Her Royal Highness Princess Alice, Duchess of Gloucester to be Colonel-in-Chief, Royal Australian Corps of Transport.

== Order of Australia ==
The following appointments were made in the Order of Australia.

=== Knight (AK) ===
==== General Division ====
- Sir Colin York Syme

=== Companion (AC) ===
==== General Division ====
- Sir Arthur Harold Tange CBE – For eminent and meritorious public service.
- Colin Milton Thiele – For eminent and meritorious service to literature and education
- The Honourable John Trezise Tonkin – For eminent and meritorious service to politics and government.

=== Officer (AO) ===
==== General Division ====
- Alton McAllan Batty – For distinguished service to industry.
- Maxwell Frank Cooper Day – For distinguished service in the field of biographical research.
- George Lionel Gray – For distinguished service to medicine, particularly ear, nose and throat surgery.
- Norman Walker Lawrence – For distinguished service to the motor industry.
- Dr. William Griffith McBride CBE – For distinguished service to medicine and medical research, particularly on obstetrics and gynaecology.

==== Military Division ====
- Air Commodore John Ralph Anstee
- Rear Admiral Neil Ewen McDonald
- Major General John Malcolm McNeil OBE, ED
- Commodore Dacre Henry Deudraeth Smyth
- Major General John Whitelaw CBE

=== Member (AM) ===
==== General Division ====
- James Henry Anderson – For services to local government and the community.
- Benjamin Arthur Barnett – For services to cricket and tennis.
- Dulcie Sybil Bellhouse – For services to music.
- Leonard Stanley Blease MBE – For services to the Merchant Navy War Service League and to the sport of swimming.
- Captain Phillip James Edward Brady – For services to the maritime industry.
- Colin William Branson – For services to industry.
- Anthony David Buckley – For services to the film industry.
- Alderman Robert Wyndham Clampett – For services to local government.
- Frederick Albert Lorimer Connell – For services to the fishing industry.
- Jack Cottrill – For services to the community.
- Norman George Dalimore – For services to the community.
- Catherine Joyce Dundon – For services to women's sport.
- Dymphna Maureen Eszenyi – For services to the welfare of handicapped children.
- Charles Oscar Gardiner – For services to the Returned Services League and the community.
- Frederick Leonard Hall – For services to commerce and industry.
- Patrick John Hall – For services to the mining industry, local government and the community.
- Cecil Dengate Hensley – For services to the community and to athletics.
- John Hunter – For services to Rugby Union football.
- Ian George Hudson – For services to the community.
- Patrick Joseph Kelly – For services to athletics.
- Mary Best Lambie – For services to the Girl Guides Association of Australia.
- John Lazarus – For services to local government and the community.
- Edna Josephine Luber-Smith – For services to the community.
- Alessandro Lutero – For services to the community, particularly Italian migrants.
- Barrie Raymond Miller – For services to hospital pharmacy.
- Elena Luisa Rubeo – For services to the welfare of Italian migrants.
- William Peter Sher – For services to industry.
- Ronald George Soundy – For services to local government.
- Francis Jackson Stewart – For services to the community, particularly in the field of Aboriginal welfare.
- Andrew Nowell Walls – For services to local government and municipal administration.
- Colin James Williams ED – For services to local government, particularly to the welfare of ex-servicemen and women.
- Charles Frederick Wright – For services to the optometrical industry and to the community.

==== Military Division ====
Army

- Lieutenant Colonel Stefan Eugen Abrahamffy – Royal Australian Army Ordnance Corps
- Lieutenant Colonel Bruce Cricton Barrett – Royal Australian Armoured Corps
- Lieutenant Colonel John Fletcher Bertram – Royal Australian Artillery
- Colonel Edward James Compton – Australian Staff Corps
- Lieutenant Colonel John Howard Kemp – Royal Australian Engineers
- Lieutenant Colonel Leslie Mechtler ED – Royal Australian Infantry Corps

Navy

- Captain Ian Blyth James
- Captain John Lancaster
- Commander Norman Bruce Dickson

Air Force

- Group Captain Donald Charles Mazlin
- Group Captain Edward Arundel Radford
- Group Captain Gordon Stanley Zantuck

=== Medal (OAM) ===
==== General Division ====
- Peter Colebrook Abbott-Young – For community service, particularly to the Multiple Sclerosis Society of S.A.
- Margaret Adeney – For voluntary services at the RAN Hospital, HMAS Cerberus.
- Richard Stanley Barwood – For community service.
- Amie Idella Hope Bishop – For community service.
- Thomas Andrew Brown – For public service.
- Pauline Coe – For service to Aboriginal children.
- Charles Vernon Joseph Dahi – For public service, particularly in providing assistance to migrants.
- Thelma Ruth Dearn – For community service.
- Mavis Merle Ebzery – For service to amateur athletics.
- Edward Condon Evans – For public service, particularly in the field of Aboriginal welfare.
- Margaret Grace Field – For service to nursing.
- John Jeffrey Foley – For public service
- Jessie Mildred Foster – For community service.
- Donald McNicol Fyfe – For service to local government.
- Phyllis Jean Gray – For community service.
- Ethel Mary Hancock – For community service.
- Henry Howard Hankin – For community service, particularly to retarded persons.
- Emanuel Linlay Harris – For service to water sport.
- Rita Howard – For community service.
- Dorothy Agnes Hughes – For community service.
- Michael Eugene Kartzoff – For community service.
- John Robert Langman – For services to local government.
- Kenneth Neilson Lincoln – For community service, particularly in the field of mental health.
- Claude Edgar McCarthy – For services to photography.
- Kenneth Laurence Payne – For service to technical education.
- Tom William Roberts – For public service.
- Louie Robertson – For community service.
- Wilfred Gordon Robinson – For community service.
- Anne Winifred Sansom – For community service.
- Betty Margaret Schofield – For service to nursing.
- Amy Schwartz – For community service.
- Archibald Llewellyn Sealey – For services to local government.
- John Barrass Thwaites – For service to conservation.
- Edwin James Vickery – For service to horticulture and community.
- Don Winton – For community service.
- Thora Wright – For service to Aboriginal children.

==== Military Division ====
Army

- Warrant Officer Class One Allen John BAXTER, RAA
- Warrant Officer Class One Brian George BURNETT, RA Inf.
- Warrant Officer Class One William Cram LIDDELL, RAA
- Warrant Officer Class One Colin Henry SWINBOURNE, RA Inf.
- Warrant Officer Class One Wallace Talbot Claxton THOMPSON, RA Inf.
- Warrant Officer Class Two Charles James EAST, RAAC
- Warrant Officer Class Two Henry Arthur WEBB, RAE

Navy

- Warrant Officer Timothy COLLINS
- Warrant Officer Ernest Ralph GRAHAM
- Warrant Officer Harold Edward WATLING

Air Force

- Warrant Officer Peter Charles Robert BAKER
- Warrant Officer George Thomas CLARKE
- Warrant Officer Evan Clare JAMES
- Warrant Officer Malcolm Charles TUCKER

== Knight Bachelor ==
- Samuel Gerald Wood Burston OBE – For distinguished service to primary industry.
- Eustace John Cameron CBE – For distinguished service to the community.
- Clarence (Clarrie) Waldemar Harders OBE – For distinguished public service.
- Donald James Hibberd OBE – For distinguished service to primary industry.
- Professor Edward Stuart Reginald Hughes CBE – For distinguished service to medicine in the field of surgery.
- The Honourable Justice Percy Ernest Joske CMG – For distinguished parliamentary service and services to law and to the community.
- Walter McElister Leonard DFC – For distinguished service to industry.
- Dr Alan Walsh – For distinguished service to science.

== Most Distinguished Order of Saint Michael and Saint George ==
=== Knight Grand Cross (GCMG) ===
- The Right Honourable John Grey Gorton CH – For eminent service to the Parliament and to Australia.
- The Right Honourable William McMahon CH, MP – For eminent service to the Parliament and to Australia.

=== Companion (CMG) ===
- The Honourable Kenneth William Aspery QC – For distinguished service to government.
- The Honourable Justice Robert Marsden Hope – For distinguished service to government.
- Dr. Robert James Furlong McInerney – For distinguished service to medicine.
- George Polites MBE – For distinguished service to industrial relations.

== Order of the British Empire ==
=== Knight Commander (KBE) ===
==== Civil Division ====
- His Eminence Cardinal James Darcy Freeman – For distinguished service to the church.

==== Military Division ====
- Air Marshal James Anthony Rowland DFC, AFC – Chief of Air Staff

=== Commander (CBE) ===
==== Civil Division ====
- Richard Bonynge – For meritorious service to the performing arts.
- William Callaghan – For meritorious public service and service to industry.
- Charles Kennedy Comans OBE, QC – For meritorious public service.
- Francis Eugene Galbally – For meritorious service to the community.
- Eber Frederick Lane – For meritorious public service.
- Thomas Molomby MBE – For meritorious service to law.
- Isaac Richard Norman MBE – For meritorious service to commerce in the field of banking.
- Dr Margery Scott-Young – For meritorious service to medicine.

=== Officer (OBE) ===
==== Civil Division ====
- Dr Michael Anthony – For service to medicine.
- Reginald Edward Bailey DSO DFC – For public service.
- Barbara Mary Chisholm MBE – For service to education.
- John Coombe – For public service.
- Roy Daniel – For public service.
- John Grant Denton – For service to the church.
- Leonard Bertram Dommett, – For service to the performing arts.
- Rolf Harris MBE – For service to the performing arts. Revoked 2015.
- Dr Ian Conrad Heinz – For public service.
- Austin Stewart Holmes – For public service.
- Laurence Reginald Killeen – For public service.
- Edward Stanley Lightly – For public service.
- Yvonne McComb – For service to the community.
- Arthur William McMichael – For public service.
- Gwenyth Valmai Meredith MBE (G. V. Harrison) – For service to the arts.
- The Reverend David Roy Merritt – For service to the community.
- Robert Money – For service to the community.
- Lyndon Charles Noakes – For public service.
- Dr Robert Cecil York Norton – For services to dentistry.
- Geoffrey Penwill Parsons – For service to the performing arts.
- John Gowar Ritchie – For service to technology.
- John Robson – For service to the community.
- William Sloan – For service to industry.
- Professor Derek Edward Tribe – For service to education.
- Peter Francis Underhill – For service to the community and to international relations.
- Gerald Unkles – For public service.
- Richard Minchin Ure MBE – For public service.
- Peter Provis Warrick – For service to politics.
- Russell John Whitmont – For service to industry.
- Guthrie Edward Melville Wilson MC – For service to education.
- William Worth – For public service.

=== Member (MBE) ===
==== Civil Division ====
- Alderman Henry Robert Seton Anderson – For service to local government and the community.
- Peter Nicholas Aroney – For service to the community.
- Werner Bae – For service to the performing arts.
- Matron Daphne Camilla Barrett (Mrs Frater) – For service to nursing.
- Alderman Ernest John Beaver – For service to local government and to the community.
- Eric Oscar Boyson – For service to the community.
- Sybil Joyce Boyson – For service to the community.
- John William Chegwyn – For service to sport.
- The Reverend Ronald Charles Coleman – For service to the church and to the community.
- Raymond Arthur Collins – For public service.
- John Bede Commins, of Braddon – For service to journalism.
- Dorothy Tidmarsh Coultas – For service to the community.
- Francis Hugh Cushing – For service to the community.
- Ann Patricia Dalgarno – For service to the community.
- Sister Mary Dorothea Devine – For service to nursing.
- Madena Davis Douglas – For service to the welfare of veterans
- Phillip Laurence Ferrier – For service to the community.
- Barbara Frances Garrett – For service to the community.
- Allan Gray – For public service.
- Judith Green – For service to the community.
- George Daniel Harris – For public service.
- John Norman Harvey DFC – For service to the community.
- Deaconess Winifred Margaret Hilliard – For service to Aboriginal welfare.
- Edward Henry Hincksman – For public service.
- Stanley Bland Hone – For service to aviation.
- Leonard Iles – For service to the community.
- Councillor Maurice George Jarvis – For service to local government and to the community.
- Lindsay Lewis Lock – For public service.
- Robert Emmanuel McClintock – For service to the community.
- Alderman Norman Lang McKellar – For service to local government, and to the community.
- Alderman Iris Ruby Macdonald – For service to local government and to the community.
- The Reverend George Stanley Martin – For service to the community.
- Henry Francis Monaghan – For service to technology.
- Wallis Whitefield Moore – For public service.
- Margaret Mort – For service to occupational therapy.
- Francis Claude Murphy – For service to the community.
- Jessie Ross Murray – For service to the performing arts.
- Gordon Henry Neill – For public service.
- Norman Etwell Newton – For public service.
- Alderman William Robert Nicholas – For service to local government and the community.
- Bruna Nobili – For service to the community.
- Theo Notaras – For service to the community.
- Dr Francis Sherlock Pearle – For public service.
- Dorothy Philp Pearce – For service to the community.
- The Reverend John Perkins – For service to the church.
- Leslie Phenna – For service to the welfare of veterans.
- Kevin Renton Power – For service to journalism.
- Henry Alfred Ruffell – For public service.
- Grahame Yorke Dalley Scarlett – For service to the community.
- William Charles Edward Shier – For public service.
- John McIlweaith Smith – For service to the community.
- Alan John Sweeting – For public service.
- James Linsey Tandy – For public service.
- Thomas Tycho – For service to the performing arts.
- John Robert Maxwell Walters – For service to the community and to local government.
- Mervyn Edward Werrell – For service to the community and to local government.

==== Military Division ====
Royal Australian Navy

- Superintendent Donald Copp
- Lieutenant Commander Frederick Anthony Bush
- Lieutenant Commander Jack William Levy
- Lieutenant Commander Rodney Trevor Nott

Royal Australian Army

- Major John Basson Humffray, Royal Australian Corps of Transport.
- Major Alfred James Larson, Royal Australian Infantry.
- Major Peter Edward Morriss McGuinness, Royal Australian Infantry.
- Major George Francis Powell, Royal Australian Signals.
- Major Gordon Kay Richardson, Royal Australian Electrical and Mechanical Engineers.
- Major Terence John Smith, Royal Australian Infantry.

Royal Australian Air Force

- Captain Bruce Davies, Royal Australian Infantry
- Squadron Leader Donald Gordon Dickie
- Squadron Leader Hans Joachim Fuhrmann
- Squadron Leader Frank Korbl
- Squadron Leader Leslie Charles Watts

== Companion of the Imperial Service Order (ISO) ==
- Ronald Ralph Gray – For long and valuable public service, particularly as Deputy Commissioner of Taxation.
- John Langford Knight – For long and valuable public service, particularly as Deputy-Controller, Department of Productivity.
- Archibald Wallace Nelmes – For long and valuable public service, particularly as Assistant Secretary, Department of Administrative Services.
- John Thomas Smith – For long and valuable public service, particularly as Minister (Commercial) Washington, Department of Overseas Trade.

== British Empire Medal (BEM) ==
=== Military Division ===
- Warrant Officer Raymond Laverty, Royal Australian Navy.
- Chief Petty Officer Ralph Norman, Royal Australian Navy.
- Chief Petty Officer Norman William Swinnerton, Royal Australian Navy.
- Temporary Warrant Officer Class 2 Reginald Alexander Palmer, Royal Australian Armoured Corps.
- Sergeant Alexander Francis Johns, Royal Australian Armoured Corps.
- Sergeant Kevin John Witherow, Royal Australian Army Medical Corps.
- Lance Corporal Darryl Rex Miels, Royal Australian Engineers.
- Flight Sergeant John Patrick Doran, Royal Australian Air Force.
- Sergeant Ronald Feudoloff, Royal Australian Air Force.
- Sergeant John Alexander Henson, Royal Australian Air Force.

=== Civil Division ===
- Reginald Wallace Bailey – For public service.
- Florence Caroline Ballhausen – For service to the community.
- Martha Margaret Susan Barany – For service to the community.
- Donald Keeling Berridge – For public service.
- Leslie William Joseph Bond – For public service.
- Eileen Marjorie Bowker – For public service.
- Paul Martin Boyce – For public service.
- Irene Mary Burke – For public service.
- Amy May Byriel – For service to the community.
- John Douglas Chamberlain – For public service.
- Harrold Owen George Chappell – South Australia. For public service.
- Sister Mary Sabina (Miss Conway) – For service to education.
- Heather Ray Coogan – For service to the community.
- Lyle Adele Dart – For service to the community.
- Wendy Marie Ey – For service to sport.
- Stephen Thomas Filmer – For service to the community.
- Keith Memory Firth – For public service.
- Margaret Eileen Fry – For public service.
- Mabel Lucretia Fuller – For public service.
- Annie Aileen Gaffney – For public service.
- Emily Mary Greenhalgh – For public service.
- Mavis Jean Hammersley – For public service.
- Lilian Emily Hillyer – For service to the community.
- Raymond Arthur Hoffman – For service to primary industry and to the community.
- Walter William Edward Honey – For public service.
- Kenneth George Lanham – For public service.
- Cecil Henry Luckhurst – For public service.
- John Walter Macauley – For public service.
- Joyce Rita McCombe – For service to the community.
- Alexander Wray McDonald – For public service.
- Albert Ernest Magor – For public service.
- Bernard Curren Masterson – For public service.
- Victor James Meehan -For public service.
- Desma Lorraine M'Eek – For public service.
- John William Seymour Mitchell – For public service.
- Ross Moody – For public service.
- Roger Clifton Moore – For service to the community.
- David Neagle – For service to the community.
- Lillian Margaret Nichols – For service to the community.
- Athol Wilson Noble – For service to the community.
- Andrew William Palm – For public service.
- Leslie James Hulbert Parker – For public service.
- Eric Thomas Parr, of Campbell – For public service.
- Imelda Theresa Payne – For public service.
- Norma Catherine Pitscheneder – For service to the community.
- Beryl Ellen Quartel – For service to the community.
- Vincent Trevor Ranson – For public service.
- Kenneth Ivan Watson Roberts – For public service.
- Gertrude Emily Salcole – For public service.
- Leslie Arthur Sayers – For service to the community.
- Janet Strang Stevenson – For public service.
- Colin Cyril Telfer – For public service.
- Councillor Kevin Bertram John Thomas – For service to the community and to local government.
- Edna Mary Thompson, of Reid – For public service.
- Maud Beatrice Turley – For service to the community.
- Lily Wainwright – For service to the community.
- William Alfred George Watson – For service to the community.
- Francis Werner – For public service.
- Mervyn Williams – For service to the welfare of veterans.
- Henry William Wiltshire – For public service.

== Royal Red Cross (RRC) ==
- Group Officer Joan Dorothy Kirwin ARRC, Royal Australian Air Force Nursing Service.

=== Associate of the Royal Red Cross (ARRC) ===
- Lieutenant Colonel Helen Francis Adamson, Royal Australian Army Nursing Corps.
- Major Alma Therese Straube, Royal Australian Army Nursing Corps.

== Air Force Cross (AFC) ==
- Lieutenant Commander Robert Reran Waldron, Royal Australian Navy.
- Major Graeme Roderick Maughan, Australian Army Aviation Corps.
- Wing Commander Baillie John McKenny, Royal Australian Air Force.
- Squadron Leader Reginald John Meissner, Royal Australian Air Force.
- Squadron Leader Allen Alfred Page, Royal Australian Air Force.
- Flight Lieutenant Christopher Tames Hancock, Royal Australian Air Force.
- Flight Lieutenant Ian Mallett, Royal Australian Air Force.
- Flight Lieutenant John Randolph Sampson, Royal Australian Air Force.

== Queen's Commendation for Valuable Service in the Air ==
- Captain Peter Allan Muir, Australian Army Aviation Corps.

== Queen's Police Medal (QPM) ==
- Senior Inspector Fred Samuel Luther – For long and distinguished service with the Commonwealth Police.

== Queen's Fire Service Medal (QFSM) ==
- William Charles Harris – For long and distinguished services particularly as Director, Fire Services, Department of Transport.
