= Thyroid disease in women =

Thyroid disease in women is an autoimmune disease that affects the thyroid in women. This condition can have a profound effect during pregnancy and on the child. It also is called Hashimoto's thyroiditis (theye-royd-EYET-uhss). During pregnancy, the infant may be seriously affected and have a variety of birth defects. Many women with Hashimoto's disease develop an underactive thyroid. They may have mild or no symptoms at first, but symptoms tend to worsen over time. If a woman is pregnant and has symptoms of Hashimoto's disease, the clinician will do an exam and order one or more tests.

The thyroid is a small gland in the front of the neck. The thyroid makes hormones called T3 and T4 that regulate how the body uses energy. Thyroid hormone levels are controlled by the pituitary gland, which is a pea-sized gland in the brain. It makes thyroid stimulating hormone (TSH), which triggers the thyroid to make thyroid hormone.

In thyroid disease the immune system makes antibodies that damage thyroid cells and interfere with their ability to make thyroid hormone. Over time, thyroid damage can cause thyroid hormone levels to be too low. This is called an underactive thyroid or hypothyroidism (heye-poh-THEYE-royd-ism). An underactive thyroid causes every function of the body to slow down, such as heart rate, brain function, and the rate your body turns food into energy. Hashimoto's disease is the most common cause of an underactive thyroid. It is closely related to Graves' disease, another autoimmune disease affecting the thyroid.

== Effects of hormone ==
Normal hormone changes during pregnancy cause thyroid hormone levels to increase. The thyroid may enlarge slightly in healthy women during pregnancy, but not enough to be felt. These changes do not affect the pregnancy or unborn baby. Yet, untreated thyroid problems can threaten pregnancy and the growing baby. Symptoms of normal pregnancy, like fatigue, can make it easy to overlook thyroid problems in pregnancy.

Thyroid hormone is vital during pregnancy. The unborn baby's brain and nervous system need thyroid hormone to develop. During the first trimester, the baby depends on the mother's supply of thyroid hormone. At 10 to 12 weeks of pregnancy, the baby's thyroid begins to work on its own. But the baby still depends on the mother for iodine, which the thyroid uses to make thyroid hormone. Pregnant women need about 250 micrograms (mcg) of iodine a day. Some women might not get all the iodine they need through the foods they eat or prenatal vitamins. Using iodized salt — salt that has had iodine added to it over plain table salt is recommended. Prenatal vitamins that contain iodine are also recommended.

Some women develop thyroid problems in the first year after giving birth. This is called postpartum thyroiditis. It often begins with symptoms of an overactive thyroid, which last 2 to 4 months. Mild symptoms might be overlooked. Affected women then develop symptoms of an underactive thyroid, which can last up to a year. An underactive thyroid needs to be treated. In most cases, thyroid function returns to normal as the thyroid heals.

== Testing ==
Experts have not reached agreement on whether all pregnant women should be routinely screened for thyroid problems. But, if an underactive thyroid with or without symptoms is found during pregnancy it should be treated to lower the risk of pregnancy problems. An underactive thyroid without symptoms occurs in 2 to 3 in every 100 pregnancies. Women can request thyroid screening.

== Disease prior to pregnancy ==
Women being treated for Hashimoto's disease can become pregnant. It is recommended that thyroid function be well-controlled before getting pregnant.

Untreated or poorly treated underactive thyroid can lead to problems for the mother, such as:

- Preeclampsia
- Anemia
- Miscarriage
- Placental abruption
- High cholesterol
- Postpartum bleeding

It also can cause serious problems for the baby, such as:

- Preterm birth
- Low birth weight
- Stillbirth
- Birth defects
- Thyroid problems

== Treatment during pregnancy ==
During pregnancy, women may want to see both an OB/GYN and an endocrinologist, a doctor who treats people with hormone problems. Levothyroxine is safe to use during pregnancy and necessary for the health of the baby. Women with Hashimoto's disease or an underactive thyroid who are taking levothyroxine before pregnancy may need a higher dose to maintain normal thyroid function. Clinicians may check thyroid function every 6 to 8 weeks during pregnancy. After delivery, hormone levels usually go back to the pre-pregnancy level.

== Breastfeeding ==
Levothyroxine does pass through breast milk. It is not likely to cause problems for the baby. In some cases, an underactive thyroid may inhibit the production of breast milk.
