= Foundation 41 =

Australian medical research organization

Foundation 41 was a medical research organisation, principally investigating the causes of mental and physical handicaps in babies, and was based at the Crown Street Women's Hospital, Sydney, Australia. It was founded in 1971 by Dr William McBride and largely supported by the Apex Clubs of Australia.

The name Foundation 41 derives from the normal duration of human gestation (40 weeks) plus the first week of life after birth.

== Funding ==
McBride created Foundation 41 using prize money given by France's L'Institut de la Vie in connection with his discovery that thalidomide (N-α-phthalimidoglutarimide) caused malformations by interacting with the DNA of dividing embryonic cells.

Ongoing funding was by public philanthropy. This essentially ceased with the Debenox case.

== Debenox ==
McBride's later involvement with Debenox (pyridoxine/doxylamine) is less illustrious, and had a marked effect on Foundation 41. In 1981 McBride published a paper indicating that the drug Debenox (marketed in the US as Bendectin) caused birth defects. His coauthors noted that the published paper contained manipulated data and protested but their voices went unheard. Multiple lawsuits were undertaken by patients and McBride was a willing witness for the claimants. Eventually, the research was investigated and, as a result, McBride was struck off the Australian medical register in 1993 for deliberately falsifying data. An inquiry determined, "we are forced to conclude that Dr. McBride did publish statements which he either knew were untrue or which he did not genuinely believe to be true, and in that respect was guilty of scientific fraud." McBride was reinstated to the medical register in 1998.

== See also ==
- Dr Alex Karczmar
