= Alex Karczmar =

Polish-American neuroscientist (1917–2017)

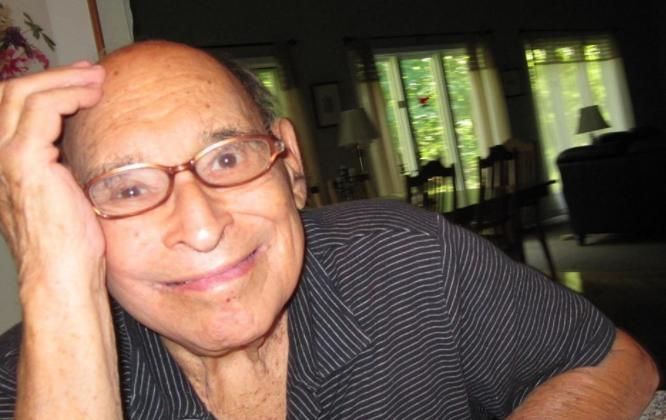
- Alex Karczmar in 2016
- Born: May 9, 1917; Warsaw, Poland
- Died: August 17, 2017 (aged 100); Chicago

Alexander George Karczmar (May 9, 1917 – August 17, 2017) was a Polish-American neuroscientist and academic. He was professor and chairman of the Department of Pharmacology and Experimental Therapeutics at Loyola University Medical Center from 1956 to 1986, and director of its Institute for Mind, Drugs, and Behavior.

His research focused on the cholinergic system, investigating its autonomic and central functions, as well as its role in various human and animal behaviors. Beginning in the 1970s, he also delved into the concept of the "self," linking it with the cholinergic system.

== Biography ==
=== Early life and education ===
Karczmar was born on May 9, 1917, in Warsaw, Poland, to Stanislas "Szmaya" Karczmar and Helena "Hendla" Karczmar-Billauer. He graduated from Collegium High School in Warsaw in 1934. His studies at the University of Warsaw were interrupted by anti-Semitic incidents and the outbreak of World War II.

After emigrating to the United States, he enrolled in graduate school at Columbia University, New York, earning his M.A. in zoology in 1941. Karczmar was naturalized as an American citizen in January 1946. He obtained his Ph.D. in biophysics in 1947 under the mentorship of Selig Hecht. Karczmar served as a teaching fellow at Columbia University and worked as a postdoctoral fellow on limb regeneration with Oscar E. Schotte at Amherst College, Massachusetts. He also studied the delays in neuromuscular relaxation with Alexander Sandow of New York University.

=== Career ===
After graduating from Columbia, he served as assistant and associate professor in the Department of Pharmacology and Therapeutics at Georgetown University in Washington, D.C., from 1946 to 1953, where he worked in the cholinergic field under the guidance of Professor Koppanyi. From 1953 to 1956, he served as a fellow at Sterling Winthrop Research Institute in Rensselaer, New York, being part of a team that developed Ambenonium (Mytelase), a drug used in the treatment of myasthenia gravis, and the vasodilator amitriptyline (Myordil).

In 1956, Karczmar moved to Loyola University Medical Center in Maywood, Illinois, where was professor and chairman of the Department of Pharmacology and Experimental Therapeutics between 1956 and 1986. From 1964 to 1986, he was the senior director of the Institute for Mind, Drugs, and Behavior. From 1988 to 1989, he was the medical director of Foundation 41 in Sydney, Australia. From 1956 to 2008 he was a senior consultant at Research Services, VA, and a consultant to the Surgeon General of the United States (1987–2017). He was a trustee and secretary of the Chicago Association for Research and Education in Science from 1987 until his death and organized or chaired several international symposia on neurobiology.

=== Later life and death ===
Karczmar was professor emeritus of pharmacology at the Stritch School of Medicine.

He died in Chicago at the age of 100 on August 17, 2017.

== Research ==
In the 1940s, Karczmar proposed the existence of a nerve growth factor based on his demonstration of the quantitative effects of partial ablations of urodele limb innervations on their post-amputation regeneration. Also in the 1940s, Karczmar conducted studies of anticholinesterase agents (antiChEs). With Theodore Koppanyi, he studied the direct synaptic effects of organophosphorus (OP) anticholinesterases (antiChEs), which are independent of their enzymic block, their morphogenetic (teratologic) effects, and their postnatal behavioral actions resulting from prenatal application. He also investigated whether OP antiChEs damage the blood–brain barrier. This research described the role of cholinesterases as morphogens and "transport" or "scavenger" enzymes (Karczmar et al., 1951).

This research led Karczmar to propose the pre-neurogenetic appearance of the cholinergic system components, their non-parallel ontogenesis, and their widespread phylogenesis, independent of innervation or motility.

In the 1950s, Karczmar and Steve Thesleff demonstrated the phenomenon of desensitization (receptor inactivation) at the neuromuscular junction. Karczmar described the reciprocal process called sensitization, which is inducible by several drugs, such as oxamides and NaF, and is ascribed to an allosteric receptor change. Karczmar also studied the structural nature of central cholinergic receptors, investigating the structural similarity between peripheral and central muscarinic receptors.

In the 1950s and 1960s, Karczmar, Kyozo Koketsu, Syogoro Nishi, and Nae Dun identified three ganglionic receptor sites (nicotinic, muscarinic, and peptidergic) and their potentials, describing their ionic mechanisms and the contribution of second messengers to ganglionic transmission.

Since the 1960s, Karczmar's work addressed the role of the central cholinergic system in various functions and behaviors, including respiration, aggression, nociception, learning, addiction, obsession, and fixation, sexual and motor activity, seizures, EEG rhythms, paradoxical sleep, and behavioral and EEG alerting. He and his associates provided early neurochemical evidence for the interaction between the cholinergic and other transmitter systems.

Karczmar investigated whether cholinergic agonists counteract the behavior exhibited in animal models of schizophrenia. Based on these findings and other cholinergic behavioral and EEG actions, Karczmar proposed that the cholinergic system contributes to alertness, cognitive behavior, and the animal's (and human's) appraisal of the environment; he named the pertinent syndrome the "Cholinergic Alert Non-mobile Behavior".

From the 1970s onwards, Karczmar explored the notion of the "self", suggesting a need to differentiate it from cognition and perception. While he considered himself a reductionist, he suggested that the current state of neuroscience is insufficient for a complete explanation, and speculated that with future advances in physics, the nature of "self" might become explainable, perhaps via multidimensional string theory.

== Recognition and honors ==
Karczmar received a Guggenheim Fellowship for his studies on paradoxical sleep with Dr. Vicenzo Longo in the Istituto Superiore Sanita, Rome, and the Senior Fulbright Fellowship for his work on ontogenetic effects of anticholinesterases in primates with Dr. William McBride at Foundation 41 of Sydney, Australia. He was a member of the IBRO Workshop in Warsaw, Poland (1963), a charter fellow of the Sherringtonian Society (1969–), and a founding member of the American College of Neuropsychopharmacology.

He received several commendations and awards, including the VA Merit Citation (2002), City of Milano Medal (1969), and the Award for Distinguished Scientific Achievement from the Council of the International Symposia for Cholinergic Mechanisms (2008). He held honorary positions at Kurume University, Kurume, Japan and the University of Pennsylvania, Philadelphia, and several visiting professorships at Université Laval, the Polish Academy of Sciences, INSERM, and Actualites Pharmacologiques.

He was a member of several National Institutes of Health (NIH) Study Sections, the Illinois Krebiozen Committee, and the Toxicology Committee of the United States National Academy of Sciences. He received a Festschrift on the neurobiology of acetylcholine in 1985. He was a member of editorial boards of scientific journals, including Journal of Pharmacology and Experimental Therapeutics, Neuropharmacology, European Journal of Pharmacology, and Archives Internationales de Pharmacodynamie et de Thérapie.

== Publications ==
Karczmar published some 400 research papers, reviews, and book chapters. He authored, co-authored, or edited seven books. His text, Exploring the Vertebrate Central Cholinergic Nervous System (Springer, New York, 2007), reviews the status of central cholinergic, covering its physiology, pharmacology, biochemistry, ontogeny, phylogenesis, and its role in functions, behaviors (including cognition), the "self", and disease states such as schizophrenia and Alzheimer's disease.

=== Books ===
- Karczmar, A. G. 2007. Exploring the Vertebrate Central Cholinergic Nervous System. Springer, New York.
- Karczmar, A. G., Koketsu, K. and Nishi, S., Eds. 1986. Autonomic and Enteric Ganglia. New York: Plenum Press.

=== Selected papers ===
- 1946: "The role of amputation and nerve resection in the regressing limbs of urodele larvae", Journal of Experimental Zoology 11013: 401-426.
- 1951: (with T. Koppanyi) "Contribution to the study of the mechanism of action of cholinesterase inhibitors", Journal of Pharmacology and Experimental Therapeutics 101: 327-343.
- 1955: (with J. W. Howard) "Antagonism of d-tubocurarine and other pharmacological properties of certain bis-quaternary salts of basically substituted oxamides WIN 8077 and analogs", Journal of Pharmacology and Experimental Therapeutics 113: 30.
- 1957: "Antagonisms between a bis-quaternary oxamide, WIN 8078, and depolarizing and competitive blocking agents", Journal of Pharmacology and Experimental Therapeutics 119: 49-47.
- 1958: (with J. P. Long) "Relationship between peripheral cholinolytic potency and tetraethylpyrophosphate antagonism of a series of atropine substitutes", Journal of Pharmacology and Experimental Therapeutics 123: 230 - 237.
- Karczmar, A. G. 1963a. Ontogenesis of cholinesterases. In: Cholinesterases and Anticholinesterase Agents, G. B. Koelle, Ed., pp. 129 – 186, Handbch. d. Exper Pharmakol., Erganzungswk., vol. 15, Berlin: Springer-Verlag, Berlin.
- Karczmar, A. G. 1963b. Ontogenetic effects. In: Cholinesterases and Anticholinesterase Agents, G. B. Koelle, Ed., pp. 799 – 832, Handbch. d. Exper. Pharmakol., Erganzungswk., vol. 15, Berlin: Springer-Verlag.
- Glisson, S. N., Karczmar, A. G. and Barnes, L. 1972. Cholinergic effects on adrenergic neurotransmitters in rabbit brain parts. Neuropharmacology 11: 465-477.
- Karczmar, A. G. 1972. What we know, will know in the future, and possibly cannot ever know in neurosciences. In: Brain and Human Behavior, ed.. A. G. Karczmar and J. C. Eccles.1 - 20, New York: Springer-Verlag.
- Karczmar, A. G. 1973. Neurochemical and behavioral bases of ethological aggression. Psychopharmacol. Bull. 9: 16-17, 1973.
- Karczmar, A. G. 1974. Brain acetylcholine and seizures. In: Psychobiology of Convulsive Therapy, M. Fink, S. Kety, J. McGaugh and T. A. Willimas, Eds., pp. 251–270, New York: Wiley and Sons.
- Karczmar, A. G. and Koehn, G. L. 1980. Cholinergic control of hypokinesia. Prog. Clin. Biol. Res. 39: 374.
- Karczmar, A. G. and Scudder, C. L. 1969a. Learning and effects of drugs on learning of related mice genera and strains. In: Neurophysiology and Behavioral Aspects of Psychotropic Drugs, W. Koella and A. G. Karczmar, Eds., pp. 132–160, Springfield, Ill.: C. C. Thomas.
- Karczmar, A. G. and Scudder, C. L. 1969b. Aggression and neurochemical changes in different strains and genera of mice. In: Aggressive Behavior, S. Garattini and E. B. Sigg, pp. 209–207, New York, John Wiley & Sons.
- Koehn, G. L., Henderson, G. and Karczmar, A. G. 1980. Diisopropyl phosphofluoridate-induced antinociception: possible role of endogenous opioids. European J. Pharmacol. 61: 1617-173.
- 2009: "Do all human functions and behaviors, as well as the "self" have cholinergic correlates?", Journal of Molecular Neuroscience
