= Guthrie Wilson =

New Zealand & Australian novelist & educator

Guthrie Edward Melville "Gus" Wilson MC OBE (8 November 1914 – 9 December 1984) was a New Zealand and Australian novelist and educator.

== Early life ==
He was born in Palmerston North and educated at Palmerston North Boys' High School and Victoria University of Wellington, where he graduated MA with first-class honours (with a thesis on Sir George Grey as Premier of New Zealand) and was a rugby blue. Then he went to Wellington Teachers' Training College. His first teaching job was at Central Primary School, Palmerston North, in 1936, which he later described as a "living death"; in Easter 1937 he went to Marlborough College.

== War service ==
He served as a New Zealand infantry officer in the Italian Campaign of 1944–45. He was awarded the MC for the action at the Senio, citing "his leadership [and] devotion to duty", an unusual award for a junior officer (2nd Lieut). As his unit was in reserve he did not participate in the Battle for Cassino. He was captured by the Germans and nearly shot as retaliation for the alleged killing of German prisoners; he was reported missing but his wife did not hear that he had been captured until he was released and arrived in England.

== Teaching career ==
In 1946 he obtained a position at his old school, Palmerston North Boys' High School, where he taught English, history and Latin. In 1954 he missed out on the position of rector (headmaster) at the school, because of controversy about the "pornography" and "foul language" in his first novel, Brave Company (led by the local MP Blair Tennent). In 1956 he successfully sued the local newspaper The Manawatu Times over a "sour grapes" review of his novel Sweet White Wine which had claimed that the novel was based on his unsuccessful application for the rectorship, obtaining substantial damages of £2500.

The Wilsons then moved to Australia, where he taught at two church schools in Sydney: Newington College from 1956 to 1962, then The Scots College. He was appointed Acting Principal of Scots College from June 1965, and was appointed Principal from 1966 after an amendment to the constitution to allow an Anglican to be appointed Principal of the Presbyterian college. He held the position until his retirement in December 1979.

He was appointed an Officer of the Order of the British Empire in the 1977 Silver Jubilee and Queen's Birthday Honours for Australia for his services to Education.

== Writing career ==
At university he had contributed poems to the university literary magazine Spike and to the left-wing magazine Tomorrow, and had short stories accepted by Man Magazine in Australia, then one of the most sexually daring magazines in Australasia. His first novel, Brave Company, was an international best-seller first published in the United States, and was controversial for its explicit language. Some later novels also drew on his war experiences.

He was described as "the only substantial New Zealand novelist to emerge from the (barren) early 1950s", and (like David Ballantyne) in the second generation of Provincial novelists in the Provincial Period of 1935 to 1964.

He died in Sydney in 1984 of a heart attack at the age of 70. He married Madge Lorraine Svenson in 1938; they had two sons and a daughter.

== Novels by Guthrie Wilson ==
- Brave Company (1950)
- Julian Ware (1952)
- The Feared and the Fearless (1953)
- Sweet White Wine (1956)
- Strip Jack Naked (1957)
- Dear Miranda (1959)
- The Incorruptibles (1960)
- The Return of the Snow-White Puritan (1963) published under the pseudonym John Paolotti
