= Doxylamine =

First-generation antihistamine used as a short-term sedative and hypnotic (sleep aid)

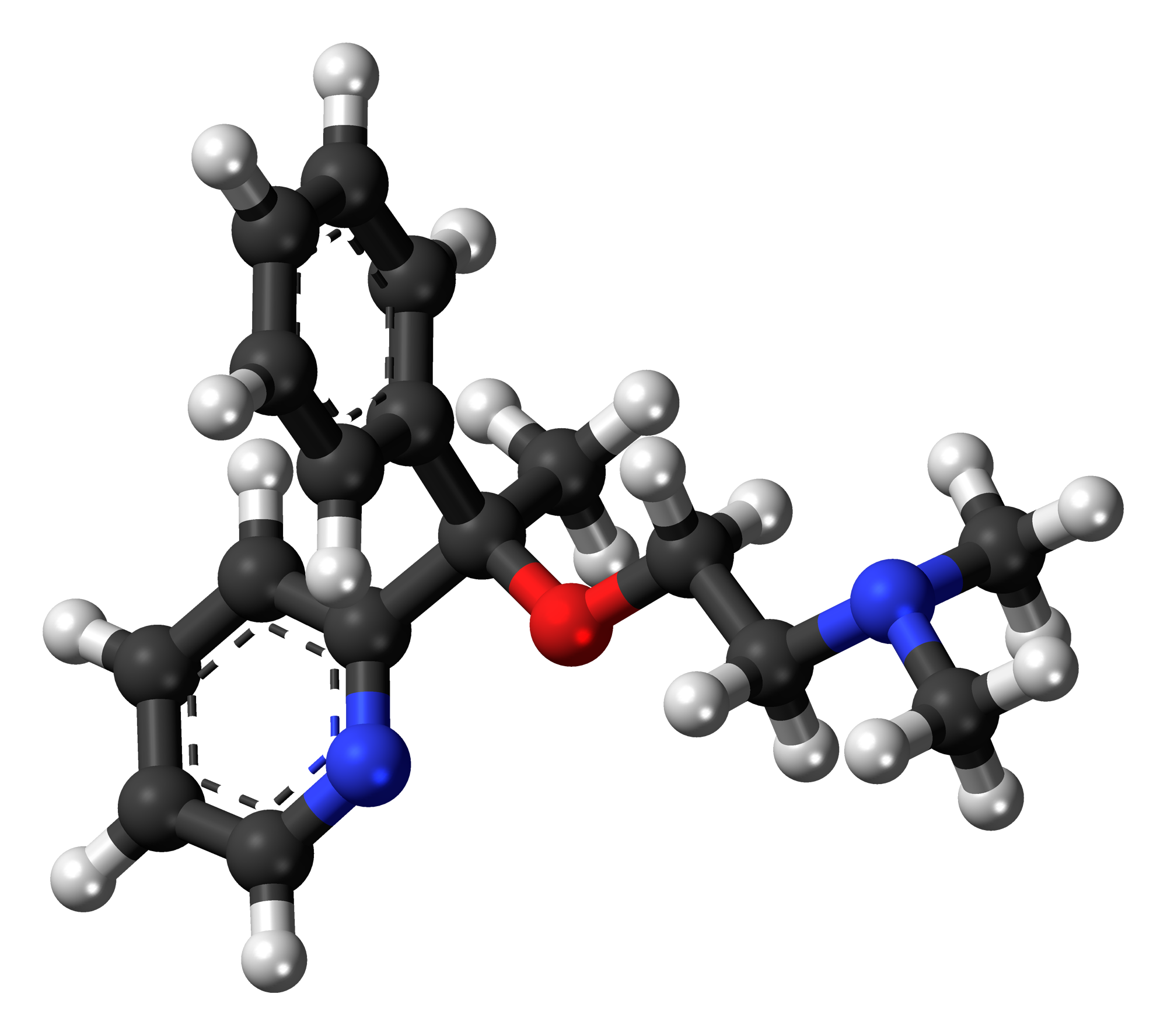

Clinical data
- Trade names: Unisom, Vicks Formula 44 (in combination with dextromethorphan), others
- AHFS/Drugs.com: Monograph
- MedlinePlus: a682537
- Pregnancy category: AU: A; A (Briggs)
- Routes of administration: By mouth
- ATC code: R06AA09 (WHO)

Legal status
- Legal status: AU: S3 (Pharmacist only); US: OTC; SE: Rx-only

Pharmacokinetic data
- Bioavailability: Oral: 24.7% Intranasal: 70.8%
- Metabolism: Hepatic (CYP2D6, CYP1A2, CYP2C9)
- Elimination half-life: 10–12 hours (range 7–15 hours)
- Excretion: Urine (60%), feces (40%)

Identifiers
- IUPAC name: (RS)-N,N-dimethyl-2-[1-phenyl-1-(pyridin-2-yl)ethoxy]ethan-1-amine
- CAS Number: 469-21-6
- PubChem CID: 3162
- IUPHAR/BPS: 7171
- DrugBank: DB00366
- ChemSpider: 3050
- UNII: 95QB77JKPL
- KEGG: D07878
- ChEBI: CHEBI:51380
- ChEMBL: ChEMBL1004
- CompTox Dashboard (EPA): DTXSID1022970
- ECHA InfoCard: 100.006.742

Chemical and physical data
- Formula: C_{17}H_{22}N_{2}O
- Molar mass: 270.376 g·mol^{−1}
- 3D model (JSmol): Interactive image
- SMILES: n1ccccc1C(c1ccccc1)(C)OCCN(C)C
- InChI: InChI=1S/C17H22N2O/c1-17(20-14-13-19(2)3,15-9-5-4-6-10-15)16-11-7-8-12-18-16/h4-12H,13-14H2,1-3H3; Key:HCFDWZZGGLSKEP-UHFFFAOYSA-N

Doxylamine is an antihistamine medication used to treat insomnia and allergies, and—in combination with pyridoxine (vitamin B_{6})—to treat morning sickness in pregnant women. It is available over-the-counter and is sold under such brand names as Unisom, among others; and it is used in nighttime cold medicines (e.g., NyQuil) and pain medications containing paracetamol (acetaminophen) or codeine to help with sleep. The medication is delivered chemically by the salt doxylamine succinate and is taken by mouth. Doxylamine and other first-generation antihistamines are the most widely used sleep medications in the world. Typical side effects of doxylamine include dizziness, drowsiness, grogginess, and dry mouth, among others.

As an antihistamine, doxylamine is an inverse agonist of the histamine H_{1} receptor. As a first-generation antihistamine, it typically crosses the blood–brain barrier into the brain, thereby producing a suite of sedative and hypnotic effects that are mediated by the central nervous system.

Doxylamine is also a potent anticholinergic, meaning that it causes delirium at high doses (i.e., at much higher doses than recommended). Specifically, it is an antagonist of the muscarinic acetylcholine receptors M_{1} through M_{5}. These sedative and deliriant effects have in some cases led to the drug being used recreationally. Doxylamine was first described in 1948 or 1949.

== Medical uses ==
Doxylamine is an antihistamine used to treat sneezing, runny nose, watery eyes, hives, skin rash, itching, and other cold or allergy symptoms. It is also used as a short-term treatment for insomnia.

=== Insomnia ===
The first-generation sedating antihistamines diphenhydramine, doxylamine, and pyrilamine are the most widely used medications in the world for preventing and treating insomnia. As of 2004, doxylamine and diphenhydramine, which are both over-the-counter medications in some countries, were the agents most commonly used to treat short-term insomnia. As of 2008 and 2017, over-the-counter antihistamines were not recommended by the American Academy of Sleep Medicine for treatment of chronic insomnia "due to the relative lack of efficacy and safety data". Neither version of their guidelines explicitly included or mentioned doxylamine, although diphenhydramine was discussed. A 2015 systematic review of over-the-counter sleep aids including doxylamine found little evidence to inform the use of doxylamine for treatment of insomnia.

A major systematic review and network meta-analysis of medications for the treatment of insomnia published in 2022 found that doxylamine had an effect size (standardized mean difference (SMD)) against placebo for treatment of insomnia at four weeks of 0.47 (95% CI 0.06 to 0.89). The certainty of evidence was rated as moderate. No data were available for doxylamine in terms of longer-term treatment (three months). For comparison, the other sedating medicines assessed, doxepin and trimipramine (both of which are tricyclic antidepressants) had effect sizes (SMD) at four weeks of 0.30 (95% CI −0.05 to 0.64) (very low certainty evidence) and 0.55 (95% CI −0.11 to 1.21) (very low certainty evidence), respectively.

Doses of doxylamine that have been used for sleep range from 5 to 50 mg, with 25 mg being the typical dose.

=== Morning sickness ===
Doxylamine is used in the combination drug pyridoxine/doxylamine to treat morning sickness (nausea and vomiting of pregnancy). It is the only medication approved by the United States Food and Drug Administration for the treatment of morning sickness.

=== Available forms ===
Doxylamine is used medically as doxylamine succinate, the succinate salt of doxylamine, and is available both alone (brand names Decapryn, Doxy-Sleep-Aid, Unisom) and in combination with pyridoxine (a form of vitamin B_{6}) (brand names Bendectin, Bonjesta, Diclegis). Doxylamine is available alone as immediate-release oral tablets containing 25 mg doxylamine succinate. Oral tablets containing 12.5 mg doxylamine succinate as well as oral capsules containing 25 mg doxylamine succinate were also previously available but were discontinued. The combination of doxylamine and pyridoxine is available in the form of extended- and delayed-release oral tablets containing 10 to 20 mg doxylamine succinate and 10 to 20 mg pyridoxine hydrochloride. Doxylamine alone is available over-the-counter, whereas doxylamine in combination with pyridoxine is a prescription-only medication. Doxylamine is also available in over-the-counter nighttime cold medicine products such as NyQuil Cold & Flu (contains acetaminophen, doxylamine succinate 6.25 to 12.5 mg, and dextromethorphan hydrobromide), where it is the sedating component.

== Contraindications ==
The fetal safety rating of doxylamine is "A" (no evidence of risk).

== Side effects ==
Side effects of doxylamine include dizziness, drowsiness, and dry mouth, among others. Doxylamine is a potent anticholinergic and has a side-effect profile common to such drugs, including blurred vision, dry mouth, constipation, muscle incoordination, urinary retention, mental confusion, and delirium.

Because of its relatively long elimination half-life (10–12 hours), doxylamine is associated with next-day effects including sedation, drowsiness, grogginess, dry mouth, and tiredness when used as a hypnotic. This next-day sedation may be described as a "hangover effect". The shorter elimination half-life of diphenhydramine (4–8 hours) compared to doxylamine may give it an advantage over doxylamine as a sleep aid in this regard.

Antihistamines like doxylamine are sedating initially but tolerance occurs with repeated use and can result in rebound insomnia upon discontinuation.

Occasional case reports of coma and rhabdomyolysis have been reported with doxylamine overdose. This pattern is in contrast to diphenhydramine.

Studies of doxylamine's carcinogenicity in mice and rats have produced positive results for both liver and thyroid cancer, especially in the mouse. The carcinogenicity of the drug in humans is not well-studied, and the International Agency for Research on Cancer lists the drug as "not classifiable as to its carcinogenicity to humans".

Continuous and/or cumulative use of anticholinergic medications, including first-generation antihistamines, is associated with a higher risk of cognitive decline and dementia in older people.

== Overdose ==
Doxylamine is generally safe for administration to healthy adults. Doses of doxylamine of up to 1,600 mg/day for 6 months have been given to adults with schizophrenia, with little toxicity encountered. However, modern toxicology data and medical case reports do not back this finding up. The median lethal dose (LD_{50}) is estimated to be 50–500 mg/kg in humans. Symptoms of overdose may include dry mouth, dilated pupils, insomnia, night terrors, euphoria, hallucinations, seizures, rhabdomyolysis, and death. Fatalities have been reported from doxylamine overdose. These fatalities have been characterized by coma, tonic-clonic (or grand mal) seizures and cardiopulmonary arrest. Children appear to be at a high risk for cardiopulmonary arrest. A toxic dose for children of more than 1.8 mg/kg has been reported. A three-year-old child died 18 hours after ingesting 1,000 mg doxylamine succinate. Rarely, an overdose results in rhabdomyolysis and acute kidney injury.

== Pharmacology ==
=== Pharmacodynamics ===
Doxylamine
Site	K_{i} (nM)	Species	Ref
SERT	10000+	Human	
NET	10000+	Human	
DAT	10000+	Human	
5-HT_{2A}	10000+	Human	
5-HT_{2C}	10000+	Human	
α_{1B}	10000+	Human	
α_{2A}	10000+	Human	
α_{2B}	10000+	Human	
α_{2C}	10000+	Human	
H_{1}	42	Human	
H_{2}	ND	ND	ND
H_{3}	10000+	Human	
H_{4}	ND	ND	ND
M_{1}	490	Human	
M_{2}	2100	Human	
M_{3}	650	Human	
M_{4}	380	Human	
M_{5}	180	Human	
Values are K_{i} (nM), unless otherwise noted. The smaller the value, the more strongly the drug binds to the site.

Doxylamine acts primarily as an antagonist or inverse agonist of the histamine H_{1} receptor. This action is responsible for its antihistamine and sedative properties. To a lesser extent, doxylamine acts as an antagonist of the muscarinic acetylcholine receptors, an action responsible for its anticholinergic and (at high doses) deliriant effects.

=== Pharmacokinetics ===
The bioavailability of doxylamine is 24.7% for oral administration and 70.8% for intranasal administration. The T_{max} of doxylamine is 1.5 to 2.5 hours. Its elimination half-life is 10 to 12 hours (range 7 to 15 hours). Doxylamine is metabolized in the liver primarily by the cytochrome P450 enzymes CYP2D6, CYP1A2, and CYP2C9. The main metabolites are N-desmethyldoxylamine, N,N-didesmethyldoxylamine, and doxylamine N-oxide. Doxylamine is eliminated 60% in the urine and 40% in feces.

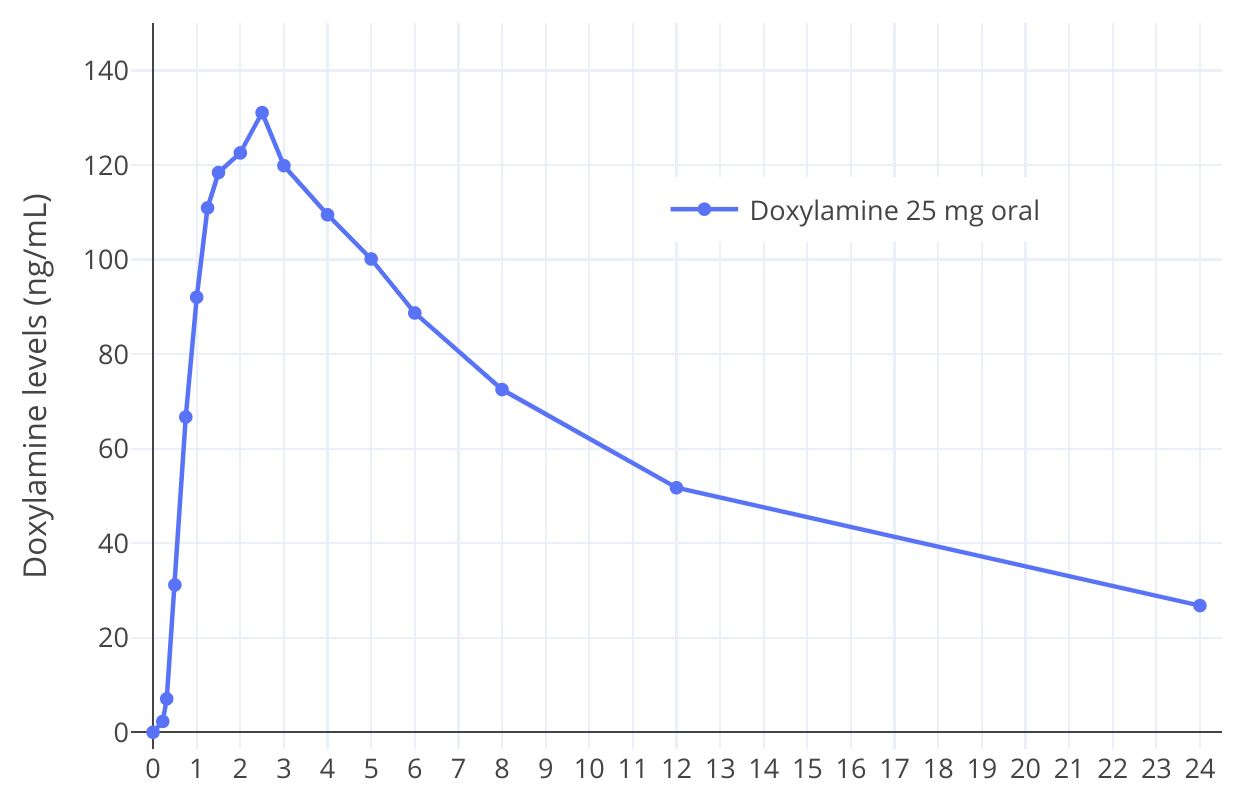
Doxylamine concentrations after a single 25 mg oral dose of doxylamine in healthy volunteers. X-axis represents the time in hours after initial dose.

== Chemistry ==
Doxylamine is a member of the ethanolamine class of antihistamines. Other antihistamines from this group include bromodiphenhydramine, carbinoxamine, clemastine, dimenhydrinate, diphenhydramine, orphenadrine, and phenyltoloxamine.

== History ==
Doxylamine is a first-generation antihistamine and was discovered by Nathan Sperber and colleagues and was first reported in 1948 or 1949. It has been the antihistamine component of NyQuil since 1966.

Bendectin, a combination of doxylamine, pyridoxine (vitamin B_{6}), and dicyclomine (an anticholinergic antispasmodic agent), was marketed for treatment of morning sickness in 1956. This product was reformulated in 1976 to remove dicyclomine. The reformulated product was voluntarily discontinued by the manufacturer in the United States in 1983 due to concerns about an alleged association with congenital limb defects. However, these concerns have not been supported by studies. In 2013, doxylamine/pyridoxine was reintroduced in the United States under the brand name Diclegis. The combination was not removed from the market in Canada, where it had been marketed since 1979.

== Society and culture ==
=== Formulations ===
Doxylamine is primarily used as the succinic acid salt, doxylamine succinate.

- It is the sedating ingredient of NyQuil (generally in combination with dextromethorphan and acetaminophen).
- In Commonwealth countries, such as Australia, Canada, South Africa, and the United Kingdom, doxylamine is available prepared with paracetamol (acetaminophen) and codeine under the brand name Dolased, Propain Plus, Syndol, or Mersyndol, as treatment for tension headache and other types of pain.
- Doxylamine succinate is used in general over-the-counter sleep-aids branded as Somnil (South Africa), Dozile, Donormyl, Lidène (France, Russian Federation), Dormidina (Spain, Portugal), Restavit, Unisom-2, Sominar (Thailand), Sleep Aid (generic, Australia), Dorminox (Poland) and Noctiben Mea (Slovenia).
- In the United States:
  - Doxylamine succinate is the active ingredient in many over-the-counter sleep aids branded under various names.
  - Doxylamine succinate and pyridoxine (vitamin B6) are the ingredients of Diclegis, approved by the FDA in April 2013 becoming the only drug approved for morning sickness with a class A safety rating for pregnancy (no evidence of risk).
- In Canada:
  - Doxylamine succinate and pyridoxine (vitamin B_{6}) are the ingredients of Diclectin, which is used to prevent morning sickness.
  - It is also available in combination with vitamin B_{6} and folic acid under the brand name Evanorm (marketed by Ion Healthcare).
- In India
  - Doxylamine preparations are available typically in combination with pyridoxine and may also contain folic acid. Doxylamine usage is thus restricted for pregnant women.
