= Jack Chegwyn =

Australian cricketer and cricket administrator

Jack Chegwyn MBE
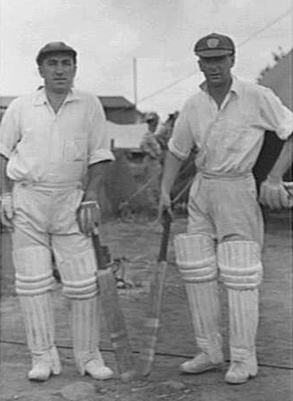
- Chegwyn (left) and Vic Jackson in 1944

Personal information
- Full name: John William Chegwyn
- Born: 18 March 1909; Botany, New South Wales, Australia
- Died: 26 May 1992 (aged 83); Sydney, Australia
- Batting: Right-handed

Domestic team information
- Years: Team
- 1940–42: New South Wales

Career statistics
Competition	First-class
Matches	5
Runs scored	375
Batting average	46.87
100s/50s	1/2
Top score	103
Catches/stumpings	3/–
- Source: ESPNcricinfo, 24 December 2016

John William Chegwyn MBE (18 March 1909 – 26 May 1992) was an Australian cricketer and cricket administrator.

A middle-order batsman, Chegwyn played five first-class matches for New South Wales between 1940 and 1942. In a first-class match in February 1941, staged to raise money for the war effort, he scored 103 in 111 minutes against South Australia. Between 1926 and 1956 he scored more than 10,000 runs in Sydney first-grade cricket.

Between 1939 and 1969 Chegwyn led and managed numerous tours by teams of leading Sydney players to New South Wales country districts. The tours enabled country people to see some of the leading players of the day, as well as allowing talented country players to make themselves known more widely. In the 1944–45 cricket season his team also toured military bases in Queensland, while in their matches in New South Wales they raised more than £1000 for war funds.

Chegwyn was a state selector for 20 years and a life member of the New South Wales Cricket Association. He was appointed Member of the Order of the British Empire (MBE) for his services to sport in the 1977 Silver Jubilee and Birthday Honours.
