= Vic Jackson =

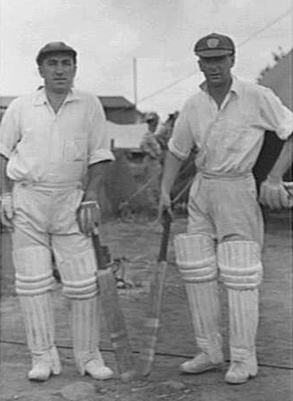
- Jackson (right) and Jack Chegwyn in 1944

Personal information
- Full name: Victor Edward Jackson
- Born: 25 October 1916; Woollahra, New South Wales, Australia
- Died: 30 January 1965 (aged 48) near Manildra, New South Wales, Australia
- Batting: Right-handed
- Bowling: Right-arm off-break Right-arm medium

Domestic team information
- Years: Team
- 1936/37–1940/41: New South Wales
- 1938–1956: Leicestershire
- debut: 30 October 1936 New South Wales v Queensland
- Last: 10 September 1958 Commonwealth XI v England XI

Career statistics
Competition	First-class
Matches	354
Runs scored	15,698
Batting average	28.43
100s/50s	21/73
Top score	170
Balls bowled	64,389
Wickets	965
Bowling average	24.74
5 wickets in innings	43
10 wickets in match	7
Best bowling	8/43
Catches/stumpings	254/–
- Source: Cricinfo, 1 July 2024

Victor Edward Jackson (25 October 1916 – 30 January 1965) was an Australian first-class cricketer who played for New South Wales and Leicestershire County Cricket Club.

== From Australia to Cahn's XI ==
Jackson made his first-class debut during the 1936–37 Sheffield Shield season with New South Wales. He was brought over to Britain by Sir Julien Cahn who raised a powerful private side based at his home at Stanford Hall. Along with Jack Walsh, Jackson played non-championship matches with Leicestershire against the Australian side. He played against Oxford University the following year. He played frequently for Cahn's XI in non-first-class matches but played against Glamorgan and on tour against New Zealand (1938–39) in first-class matches. He returned to Australian to appear in eight matches during the 1940–41 season, including one in the DG Bradman's XI v VY Richardson's XI testimonial game.

== County cricket ==
After World War II, Jackson returned to England make his Championship debut in 1946 County season. He took 88 wickets at 21.90 and passed 1000 runs.

Jackson was prominent all-rounder, bowling off-breaks at a brisk pace with a rather low arm that meant that he sometimes bowled a slow looping delivery. He played with Leicestershire until 1956, scoring 14,379 runs and taking 930 wickets. His career-best figures of 8 for 43 were taken against Glamorgan in his final season. With the bat he scored 21 hundreds, scoring 170 against Northamptonshire in 1948 as his best. He passed a thousand runs eleven times and took 112 wickets in 1955 to complete the double. He took over ninety wickets on three occasions.

== League cricket ==
Jackson played as the professional for Rawtenstall in the Lancashire League in 1957 and 1958, also making two final first-class appearances in the Torquay Festival. In the last, he captained a Commonwealth XI against an England XI.

== Death ==
Jackson was killed in a traffic accident near a level crossing in New South Wales in 1965, aged 48.
