= HER Foundation =

Charity for hyperemesis gravidarum survivors

The HER Foundation is the world’s largest grassroots network of hyperemesis gravidarum (HG) survivors and experts, as well as the leading website for HG information. It was founded in 2002 by Kimber Wakefield MacGibbon, Ann Marie King, and Jeremy King. The Foundation’s main goals are (1) to minimize the suffering and complications related to HG through education, (2) to develop an effective HG treatment protocol, (3) to eliminate the need to terminate pregnancy due to ineffective HG treatment, and (4) to raise awareness of the debilitating effects of HG.

Affiliated with the University of Southern California and University of California Los Angeles, the HER Foundation regularly works with experts in psychology, genetics, nutrition, and obstetrics to improve healthcare and outcome for HG sufferers. HER researchers created a registry of women with HG, and has undertaken a variety of online survey studies about women's experiences that have been used for research purposes at institutions including UCLA and USC, and published in numerous major medical journals.

The HER Foundation recently started the HER5K, an annual 5K race that takes place in the Washington D.C. metro area to raise awareness of HG and support for the foundation. The 1st Annual HER5K took place at the National Harbor on May 12, 2013. The HER Foundation has been featured in magazines and on TV, and its directors have advocated for HG sufferers at a briefing on Capitol Hill in Washington, DC in 2005, as well as at medical conferences in the US and UK.
