= Pyridoxine/doxylamine =

Prescription drug for pregnancy morning sickness

Combination of
- Pyridoxine: Vitamin
- Doxylamine: Antihistamine

Clinical data
- Trade names: Diclegis, Bendectin, Debendox, Lenotan, Merbental, Diclectin, others
- Pregnancy category: Compatible
- Routes of administration: By mouth

Legal status
- Legal status: CA: Approved; US: Approved; Prescription only; approved drug in Israel

Identifiers
- CAS Number: 65-23-6; 469-21-6
- PubChem CID: 163685
- ChemSpider: 10750
- UNII: KV2JZ1BI6Z; 95QB77JKPL
- KEGG: D10357

Pyridoxine/doxylamine, sold under the brand name Diclectin among others, is a combination of pyridoxine hydrochloride (vitamin B_{6}) and doxylamine succinate. It is generally used for nausea and vomiting of pregnancy (morning sickness); even though its efficacy has not been proven and subsequent research has led to the removal of recommendations in medical journals.

== Medical uses ==
The combination of pyridoxine, commonly referred to as vitamin B6 and doxylamine may be effective for the management of nausea and vomiting of pregnancy, but it is only recommended for use in a small number of cases after lifestyle, diet and vitamin B6. A 2018 review found the benefit was small.

Doxylamine and pyridoxine are pregnancy compatible drugs, consistent with FDA's safety assessment of the combination product. They have been categorized by the FDA as a category A drug (no evidence of risk to the fetus). This letter classification system for risk in pregnancy is no longer being utilized and was phased out by the FDA beginning in 2008.

=== Medical organizations' position ===
The American Congress of Obstetricians and Gynecologists (ACOG) states "Safe and effective treatments are available for more severe cases, and mild cases of nausea and vomiting of pregnancy may be resolved with lifestyle and dietary changes." The American Academy of Family Physicians recommends, "Initial treatment is conservative and includes dietary changes, emotional support, and vitamin B6 supplementation." This treatment has an evidence rating of Grade A ("consistent, good-quality patient-oriented evidence") while the addition of prescribing doxylamine is rated Grade C ("consensus, disease-oriented evidence, usual practice, expert opinion, or case series").

Canadian Family Physician issued a correction stating previous articles which stated Diclectin should be used as a first line therapy were incorrect, based upon undisclosed conflicts of interest with the manufacturer, and not peer-reviewed studies:

Recommendations in 2 articles published in Canadian Family Physician, "Nausea and vomiting of pregnancy. Evidence-based treatment algorithm" and "Treatment of nausea and vomiting in pregnancy. An updated algorithm," have subsequently come under critical scrutiny. These articles were not subjected to standard peer review, and Canadian Family Physician acknowledges that upon closer inspection these articles did not provide satisfactory evidence that would have justified the recommendation of doxylamine-pyridoxine as a sole first-line treatment for nausea and vomiting in pregnancy (NVP). More recent Canadian NVP guidelines have been published; however, a subsequent re-analysis questions the conclusions of 1 of the studies cited in these guidelines to justify doxylamine-pyridoxine as a recommended first-line treatment for NVP. Additionally, for the articles in Canadian Family Physician there was an undisclosed conflict of interest with Duchesnay, the manufacturer of Diclectin, the combination of doxylamine-pyridoxine. Canadian Family Physician encourages readers to interpret previously published NVP recommendations with caution. Readers are also referred to the commentary "Motherisk and Canadian Family Physician" in the January 2017 issue of Canadian Family Physician.
[Ed: bolding to help summarize information, note please follow link to article to see the footnotes from this article]

== Adverse effects ==
Pyridoxine, vitamin B6, is a water-soluble vitamin and is generally recognized as having no adverse effects. After diet changes, it alone is recommended as the secondary treatment plan.

The most commonly reported adverse reaction of doxylamine is drowsiness. Other adverse drug reactions associated with doxylamine succinate may include: vertigo, nervousness, epigastric pain, headache, palpitation, diarrhea, disorientation, irritability, convulsions, urinary retention or insomnia.

It is not recommended to take doxylamine with other medications of the same class, medications that act on the central nervous system (CNS) or with alcohol as this may increase the risk of adverse effects. To minimize the risk of particular adverse effects, doxylamine should not be used when taking any medication classified as a monoamine oxidase inhibitor (MAOI), and should be used with caution, if at all, when certain medical conditions are present.

Because doxylamine is small enough on a molecular weight basis to pass into breastmilk, women should not breastfeed while using products with doxylamine as this may lead to adverse effects in the breastfed infant.

=== Safety in pregnancy ===
Due to the extensive scientific evidence demonstrating that there is no difference in the risk for birth defects or other adverse pregnancy outcomes between infants whose mothers take pyridoxine/doxylamine during pregnancy and those infants whose mothers do not take this drug combination, the two ingredients of the drug are considered pregnancy compatible (or category A drugs with the previous pregnancy risk factor classification system).

Since the mid-1950s, over 33 million women have used the combination drug of pyridoxine/doxylamine in pregnancy, and scientific analysis on more than 200,000 exposed pregnancies has been conducted to determine if the combination of pyridoxine and doxylamine is harmful to the unborn baby. No epidemiological studies have found any teratogenic effect.

Two separate meta-analyses have been conducted that have assessed pregnancy outcomes following the use of a combination of pyridoxine and doxylamine with or without dicyclomine during the first trimester of pregnancy. The initial meta-analysis, published in 1988, combined data from 12 cohort and 5 case-control studies, and the subsequent meta-analysis, published in 1994, combined data from 16 cohort studies and 11 case control studies. These studies included over 200,000 Bendectin-exposed pregnancies and did not observe an increased risk for major malformations. Separate analyses were conducted for specific defects including cardiac defects, limb reduction defects, oral clefts, and genital tract malformations; no increased risks for these defects were found.

In 1989, a report on the safety of the drug combination of pyridoxine/doxylamine for use in the management of NVP was prepared by a panel of Canadian and American experts for the Special Advisory Committee on Reproductive Physiology to the Health Protection Branch of Health Canada (currently called the Health Products and Food Branch). These scientific experts concluded that "numerous studies in animals and in humans that have been reported in the scientific and medical literature demonstrate that Bendectin is not a teratogen. The safety of Bendectin/Diclectin in the management of nausea and vomiting of pregnancy has been established by its use in many thousands of pregnant women".

A study was conducted to determine whether the combination drug of pyridoxine and doxylamine had an effect on the neurodevelopment of children exposed in utero. Results from this study observed no difference in intelligence quotient scores between children who were exposed to pyridoxine/doxylamine in utero and children who were not exposed.

== History ==
The combination of doxylamine and vitamin B6 was first introduced to the US market as Bendectin in 1956. At that time, Bendectin was a 3 ingredients prescription medication. The third one, dicyclomine, a Pregnancy Category B anticholinergic/antispasmodic, was omitted from the formulation starting in 1976 due to its lack of efficacy. Bendectin (doxylamine/vitamin B6) was voluntarily removed from the market in 1983 by its manufacturer, Merrell Dow Pharmaceuticals, following numerous lawsuits alleging that it caused birth defects, although an FDA panel concluded that no association between Bendectin and birth defects had been demonstrated. In litigation, Bendectin was implicated as the cause of various fetal malformations and problems including limb and other musculoskeletal deformities, facial and brain damage, defects of the respiratory, gastrointestinal, cardiovascular and genital-urinary systems, blood disorders and cancer. The most famous case involving the drug is Daubert v. Merrell Dow Pharmaceuticals (1993). These suits were led by celebrity plaintiff attorney Melvin Belli . The star witness for the case against Bendectin, William McBride, was later found to have falsified research on teratogenic effects of the drug, and was struck off the medical register in Australia.

An extensive review of the evidence submitted in legal proceedings regarding Bendectin has been summarized and found no evidence that the drug in clinical use was linked to birth defects.

The FDA, in 1999, published a statement in the Federal Register that summarized their opinion regarding the safety of pyridoxine/doxylamine during pregnancy: "The FDA has determined that the drug product Bendectin, a tablet composed of pyridoxine hydrochloride 10 mg, and doxylamine succinate 10 mg, for the prevention of nausea of pregnancy was not withdrawn from the market for reasons of safety or effectiveness".

On Monday April 8, 2013, the FDA approved the return of the doxylamine-pyridoxine combination under the new trademark name of Diclegis. The medication is manufactured by Duchesnay Inc, a company later shown to not disclose conflict of interests with authors, leading to Canadian Family Physician to correct several articles because of their behavior and the lack of research that shows that there was medically significant results.

In July 2015, the drug company came under considerable scrutiny for promoting its drug through the American celebrity Kim Kardashian through the social media platforms Facebook and Instagram.

In October 2015, Toronto, Canada physicians Drs. Navindra Persaud, Jessica Chin, and Mark Walker wrote a public letter to the Journal of Obstetrics and Gynaecology of Canada and raised concerns over the risks of Diclectin and recommended reconsidering it as the "first-line pharmacological treatment" against the nausea and vomiting of pregnancy. Dr. Persaud shared with news agencies that his only source of research data for this drug came from Health Canada and claimed he was only able to access the document by signing a confidentiality agreement.

In January 2019, Canadian Family Physician issued a correction stating "Recommendations in 2 articles published in Canadian Family Physician, "Nausea and vomiting of pregnancy. Evidence-based treatment algorithm" and "Treatment of nausea and vomiting in pregnancy. An updated algorithm," have subsequently come under critical scrutiny. These articles were not subjected to standard peer review, and Canadian Family Physician acknowledges that upon closer inspection these articles did not provide satisfactory evidence that would have justified the recommendation of doxylamine-pyridoxine as a sole first-line treatment for nausea and vomiting in pregnancy (NVP). More recent Canadian NVP guidelines have been published; however, a subsequent re-analysis questions the conclusions of 1 of the studies cited in these guidelines to justify doxylamine-pyridoxine as a recommended first-line treatment for NVP. Additionally, for the articles in Canadian Family Physician there was an undisclosed conflict of interest with Duchesnay, the manufacturer of Diclectin, the combination of doxylamine-pyridoxine. Canadian Family Physician encourages readers to interpret previously published NVP recommendations with caution. Readers are also referred to the commentary "Motherisk and Canadian Family Physician" in the January 2017 issue of Canadian Family Physician." [Ed: bolding to help summarize information, note please follow link to article to see the footnotes from this article]

== Society and culture ==
From a legal perspective, the case through Daubert v. Merrell Dow Pharmaceuticals, Inc., 509 U.S. 579 (1993) set a new standard for admitting expert testimony in federal courts in lieu of the Frye standard.

== See also ==
- Daubert v. Merrell Dow Pharmaceuticals
- Daubert standard
