= Charles Kennedy Comans =

Australian lawyer (1914–2012)

- Born: October 21, 1914; Melbourne, Victoria, Australia
- Died: September 12, 2012 (aged 97); Canberra, Australia
- Education: Melbourne University
- Occupations: Lawyer, parliamentary draftsman, lecturer
- Spouse: Nancy Button
- Children: 3 sons (2 deceased), 1 daughter

Charles Kennedy Comans, CBE, OBE, QC (born 21 October 1914) was a lawyer, lecturer, the former First Parliamentary Counsel of the Commonwealth from 1972 - 1977. Comans died in Canberra on 12 September 2012, aged 97.

== Early life and education ==
Comans was born in Melbourne, Victoria, Australia, the only son of Michael and Kate Comans. He was educated at Christian Brothers’ College, Victoria Parade, Melbourne. There, he won a scholarship to attend St Kevin’s High School. He went on to study law at Melbourne University and at 21, he was then the youngest person to achieve a master of laws from the university.

== Career ==
Comans was admitted to the Victorian Bar in 1936, and first worked in the Taxation Office in Canberra, before becoming a legal officer in the Attorney-General’s Department, a post he held between 1938 and 1948. He went on to become the First Assistant Parliamentary Draftsman in 1949, Second Parliamentary Counsel in 1970 and First Parliamentary Counsel in 1972, a post he held for five years until 1977. His career spanned the offices of 14 Prime Ministers and 16 Attorneys-General of the Commonwealth. He was appointed Officer of the Order of the British Empire (OBE) in 1965, the Commonwealth Queen's Counsel in 1974, and CBE in 1977. The Charles Comans meeting room in the Office of Parliamentary Counsel in Canberra was named in his honour.

Some of Comans' more notable work was the drafting of the Double Dissolution Proclamation read for then Governor-General of Australia, Sir John Kerr, on the steps of Old Parliament House on 11 November 1975. This had been drafted on instruction by the Governor-General on conditions of secrecy from Prime Minister Whitlam and dissolved the then Whitlam government and appointed Malcolm Fraser as a caretaker Prime Minister.

Comans work also included the Marriage Act in 1961, the Trade Practice Act in 1974 the Family Law Act in 1975 and the Darwin Reconstruction Bill after the devastating Cyclone Tracy that hit Darwin in late 1974.

Comans has a room named for him at the Office of Parliamentary Counsel and his history has been recorded at the National Library

== Personal life ==
Comans married Nancy Button in August 1944; they had three sons - Michael (now deceased), Peter (now deceased) and Philip - and one daughter - Leigh. Apart from his roles in the Commonwealth offices, he was a lecturer at Canberra University College between 1945 and 1948.
