= Morning sickness =

Nausea due to pregnancy

- Other names: Nausea and vomiting of pregnancy, nausea gravidarum, emesis gravidarum, pregnancy sickness
- Specialty: Obstetrics
- Symptoms: Nausea, vomiting
- Complications: Wernicke encephalopathy, esophageal rupture
- Usual onset: 4th week of pregnancy
- Duration: Until 16th week of pregnancy
- Causes: Unknown
- Diagnostic method: Based on symptoms after other causes have been ruled out
- Differential diagnosis: Hyperemesis gravidarum
- Prevention: Prenatal vitamins
- Treatment: Doxylamine and pyridoxine
- Frequency: ~75% of pregnancies

Morning sickness, also called nausea and vomiting of pregnancy (NVP), is a symptom of pregnancy. Despite the name, nausea or vomiting can occur at any time during the day. Typically the symptoms occur between the 4th and 16th weeks of pregnancy. About 10% of women still have symptoms after the 20th week of pregnancy. A severe form of the condition is known as hyperemesis gravidarum and results in weight loss.

The cause of morning sickness is unknown but may relate to changing levels of the hormone human chorionic gonadotropin. Some have proposed that morning sickness may be useful from an evolutionary point of view. Diagnosis should only occur after other possible causes have been ruled out. Abdominal pain, fever, or headaches are typically not present in morning sickness.

Morning sickness affects about 70–80% of all pregnant women to some extent. About 60% of women experience vomiting. Hyperemesis gravidarum occurs in about 1.6% of pregnancies. Morning sickness can negatively affect quality of life, result in decreased ability to work while pregnant, and result in health-care expenses. Generally, mild to moderate cases have no effect on the fetus, and most severe cases also have normal outcomes. Some women choose to have an abortion due to the severity of symptoms. Complications such as Wernicke encephalopathy or esophageal rupture may occur, but very rarely.

Taking prenatal vitamins before pregnancy may decrease the risk. Specific treatment other than a bland diet may not be required for mild cases. If treatment is used the combination of doxylamine and pyridoxine is recommended initially. There is limited evidence that ginger may be useful. For severe cases that have not improved with other measures methylprednisolone may be tried. Tube feeding may be required in women who are losing weight.

== Signs and symptoms ==
About 66% of women have both nausea and vomiting, while 33% have just nausea. Symptoms of both nausea and vomiting will normally climax around 10 and 16 weeks of pregnancy, subsiding around 20 weeks. However, after around 22 weeks, up to 10% of women continue to have lingering symptoms.

== Cause ==
The cause of morning sickness is unknown but may relate to changing levels of estrogen and the hormone human chorionic gonadotropin. Some have proposed that morning sickness may be useful from an evolutionary point of view – it may protect both the pregnant woman and the developing embryo just when the fetus is most vulnerable. Diagnosis should only occur after other possible causes have been ruled out. Abdominal pain, fever, or headaches are typically not present in morning sickness.

Nausea and vomiting may also occur with molar pregnancy.

Morning sickness is related to diets low in cereals and high in sugars, oil crops, alcohol, and meat.

== Pathophysiology ==
=== Hormone changes ===
Pathophysiology of vomiting in pregnancy

- An increase in the circulating level of the hormone estrogen. However, there is no consistent evidence of differences in estrogen levels and levels of bilirubin between women that experience sickness and those that do not. Related to increased estrogen levels, a similar form of nausea is also seen in some women who use hormonal contraception or hormone replacement therapy, but does not predict future reactions to pregnancy.
- An increase in progesterone relaxes the muscles in the uterus, which prevents early childbirth, but may also relax the stomach and intestines, leading to excess stomach acids and gastroesophageal reflux disease (GERD).
- An increase in human chorionic gonadotropin. It is probably not the HCG itself that causes the nausea. More likely, it is the HCG stimulating the maternal ovaries to secrete estrogen, which in turn causes the nausea.

=== Defense mechanism ===
Morning sickness may be an evolved trait that protects the fetus against toxins ingested by the mother. Biologist Margie Profet believes that nausea and food aversions during pregnancy evolved to impose dietary restrictions on the mother in the early weeks of pregnancy, when the mother and the embryo are most immunologically vulnerable, to minimize fetal exposure to toxins such as mutagens and teratogens. By reducing exposure to such chemicals, morning sickness reduces impairments on normal embryonic development and increases the reproductive success of the mother and survival success of both the mother and her offspring. Evidence in support of this theory includes:

- Morning sickness is very common among pregnant women, which argues in favor of its being a functional adaptation and against the idea that it is a pathology.
- Fetal vulnerability to toxins peaks at around 3 months, which is also the time of peak susceptibility to morning sickness.
- There is a good correlation between toxin concentrations in foods and the tastes and odors that cause revulsion.

Women who have no morning sickness are more likely to miscarry. This may be because such women are more likely to ingest substances that are harmful to the fetus.

In addition to protecting the fetus, morning sickness may also protect the mother. A pregnant woman's immune system is suppressed during pregnancy, presumably to reduce the chances of rejecting tissues of her own offspring. Because of this, animal products containing parasites and harmful bacteria can be especially dangerous to pregnant women. There is evidence that morning sickness is often triggered by animal products, including meat and fish.

If morning sickness is a defense mechanism against the ingestion of toxins, the prescribing of anti-nausea medication to pregnant women may have the undesired side effect of causing birth defects or miscarriages by encouraging harmful dietary choices.

When analyzing embryonic growth, several critical periods are identified in which there is mass proliferation and cell division, resulting in the development of the heart and central nervous system, which are very sensitive. In that period, the fetus is most at risk from damage from toxins and mutagens. These developments occur through week 6–18, which is in the same time frame in which the most nausea and vomiting of pregnancy (NVP) occurs. This relationship between the time at which the embryo is most susceptible to toxins lines up exactly with when the most severe NVP symptoms are seen, suggesting that this NVP is an evolutionary response developed in the mother, to indicate the sensitivity of the fetus hence making her wary to her health and in turn protecting the fetus.

== Treatments ==
There is a lack of good evidence to support the use of any particular intervention for morning sickness.

=== Medications ===
Several antiemetics are effective and safe in pregnancy including: pyridoxine/doxylamine, antihistamines (such as diphenhydramine), metoclopramide, and phenothiazines (such as promethazine). Concerning effectiveness it is unknown if one is superior to another. In the United States and Canada, the doxylamine-pyridoxine combination (as Diclegis in US and Diclectin in Canada) is the only approved pregnancy category "A" prescription treatment for nausea and vomiting of pregnancy.

Ondansetron may be beneficial, but there are some concerns regarding an association with cleft palate, and there is little high quality data. Metoclopramide is also used and relatively well tolerated. Evidence for the use of corticosteroids is weak.

=== Alternative medicine ===
A recent review of studies has found acupuncture to be safe and effective for NVP. Acupressure applied at the acupuncture point PC6 with finger pressure or a nausea band has some evidence of effectiveness, as does auricular (ear acupuncture).

Some studies support the use of ginger, but overall the evidence is limited and inconsistent. Safety concerns have been raised regarding its anticoagulant properties.

== History ==
=== Thalidomide ===
In the late 1950s and early 1960s, the use of thalidomide in 46 countries by women who were pregnant or who subsequently became pregnant resulted in the "biggest man‐made medical disaster ever," with more than 10,000 children born with a range of severe deformities, such as phocomelia, as well as thousands of miscarriages.

Thalidomide was introduced in 1953 as a tranquilizer, and was later marketed by the German pharmaceutical company Chemie Grünenthal under the trade name Contergan as a medication for anxiety, trouble sleeping, "tension", and morning sickness. It was introduced as a sedative and medication for morning sickness without having been tested on pregnant women. While initially deemed to be safe in pregnancy, concerns regarding birth defects were noted in 1961, and the medication was removed from the market in Europe that year.
