= William McBride (doctor) =

Australian obstetrician (1927–2018)

William McBride CBE AO
- Born: 25 May 1927; Sydney
- Died: 27 June 2018 (aged 91)
- Education: University of Sydney
- Children: 4 including David

William Griffith McBride (25 May 1927 – 27 June 2018) was an Australian obstetrician. He published a letter on the teratogenicity of thalidomide in 1961, following the findings of a midwife named Pat Sparrow which resulted in the reduction of the number of drugs prescribed during pregnancy. Later in his life, McBride was involved in several trials with the pharma industry accusing him of medical malpractice and scientific fraud for falsifying data in a paper that claimed that the drug Debendox was also responsible for birth defects.

== Early life ==
McBride was born in Sydney, Australia.

== Career ==
=== Thalidomide case ===
McBride published a letter in The Lancet, in December 1961, noting a large number of birth defects in children of patients who were prescribed thalidomide, after a midwife named Sister Pat Sparrow first suspected the drug was causing birth defects in the babies of patients under his care at Crown Street Women's Hospital in Sydney. McBride was awarded a medal and prize money by L'Institut de la Vie, a prestigious French institute, in connection with his discovery, in 1971. Using the prize money, he established Foundation 41, a Sydney-based medical research foundation concerned with the causes of birth defects. Working with P H Huang, he proposed that thalidomide caused malformations by interacting with the DNA of the dividing embryonic cells. This finding stimulated their experimentation, which showed that thalidomide may inhibit cell division in rapidly dividing cells of malignant tumors. This work was published in the journal "Pharmacology and Toxicology" in 1999 and has been rated in the top ten of the most important Australian medical discoveries.

=== Debendox case ===
McBride's involvement in the Debendox case is less illustrious. In 1981, he published a paper indicating that the drug Debendox (pyridoxine/doxylamine; marketed in the US as Bendectin) caused birth defects. His co-authors noted that the published paper contained manipulated data and protested. Multiple lawsuits were filed by patients. Eventually, the case was investigated and, as a result, McBride was struck off the Australian medical register in 1993 for deliberately falsifying data. He was reinstated to the medical register in 1998.

=== Honours ===
McBride was nominated Man of the Year for 1962, a Commander of the Order of the British Empire (1969 Birthday Honours), Father of the Year (1972) and an Officer of the Order of Australia (1977 Silver Jubilee and Queen's Birthday Honours).

== Personal life ==
McBride had four children, one of whom is the soldier, lawyer, television presenter and whistleblower, David McBride.

== Death ==
McBride died on 27 June 2018, aged 91.

== Oral history ==
McBride was interviewed in 1972 by Hazel de Berg about his life and career. The recording can be found at the National Library of Australia.

== See also ==
- List of scientific misconduct incidents
