= Pyridoxine =

Vitamin

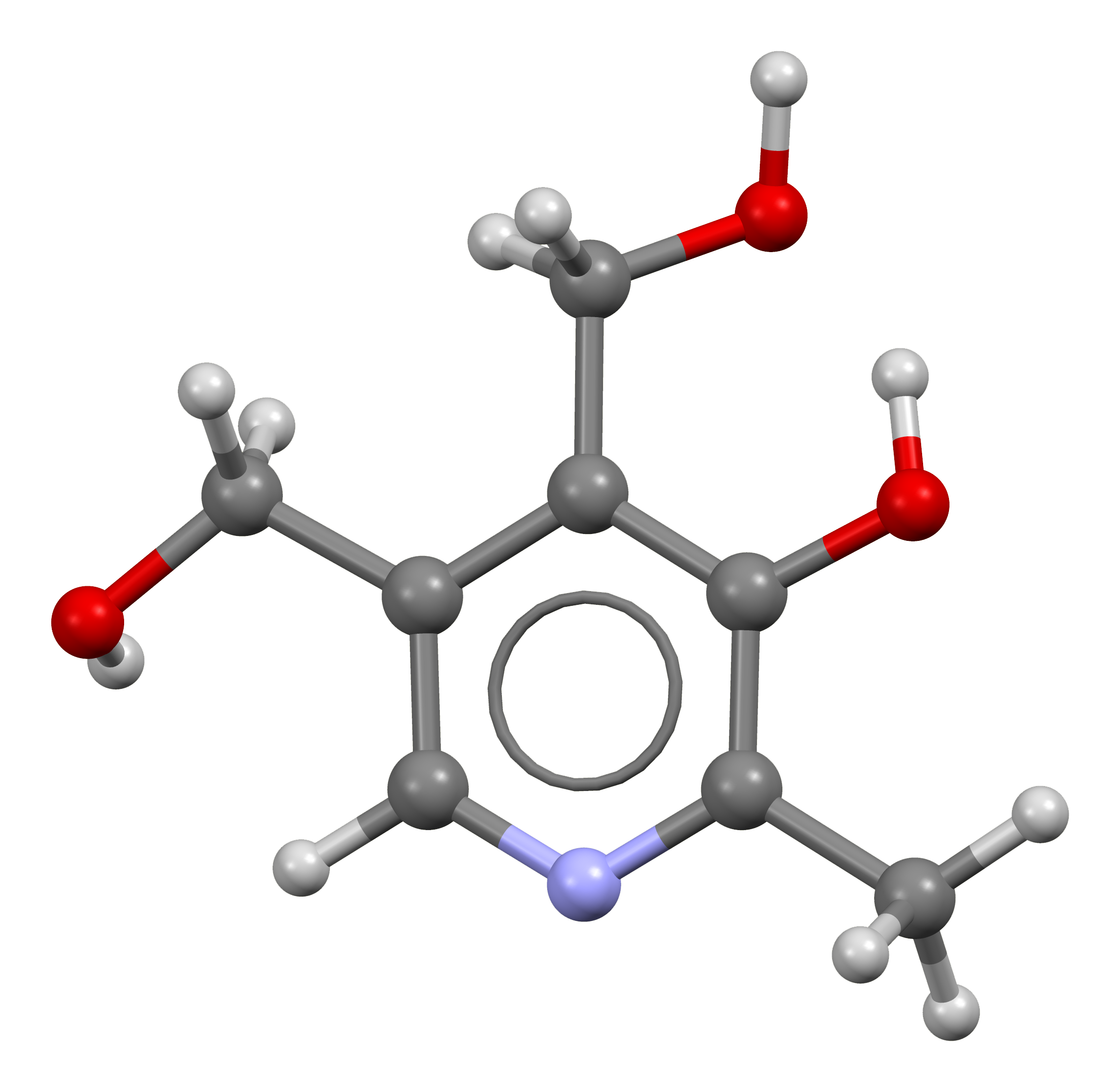
- Pyridoxine

Clinical data
- Other names: vitamin B_{6}, pyridoxol pyridoxine hydrochloride
- AHFS/Drugs.com: Monograph
- License data: US DailyMed: Pyridoxine
- Pregnancy category: AU: Exempt
- Routes of administration: By mouth, intravenous (IV), intramuscular (IM), subcutaneous
- ATC code: A11HA02 (WHO)

Legal status
- Legal status: UK: P (Pharmacy medicines); US: OTC / Rx-only

Pharmacokinetic data
- Elimination half-life: several weeks (see #Metabolism for details)

Identifiers
- IUPAC name: 4,5-Bis(hydroxymethyl)-2-methylpyridin-3-ol
- CAS Number: 65-23-6
- PubChem CID: 1054
- DrugBank: DB00165
- ChemSpider: 1025
- UNII: KV2JZ1BI6Z
- KEGG: D08454
- ChEBI: CHEBI:16709
- ChEMBL: ChEMBL1364
- CompTox Dashboard (EPA): DTXSID4023541
- ECHA InfoCard: 100.000.548

Chemical and physical data
- Formula: C_{8}H_{11}NO_{3}
- Molar mass: 169.180 g·mol^{−1}
- 3D model (JSmol): Interactive image
- Melting point: 159 to 162 °C (318 to 324 °F)
- SMILES: OCc1cnc(C)c(O)c1CO
- InChI: InChI=1S/C8H11NO3/c1-5-8(12)7(4-11)6(3-10)2-9-5/h2,10-12H,3-4H2,1H3; Key:LXNHXLLTXMVWPM-UHFFFAOYSA-N

Pyridoxine (PN) is a form of vitamin B_{6} found commonly in food and used as a dietary supplement. As a supplement it is used to treat and prevent pyridoxine deficiency, sideroblastic anaemia, pyridoxine-dependent epilepsy, certain metabolic disorders, side effects or complications of isoniazid use, and certain types of mushroom poisoning. It is used by mouth or by injection.

It is usually well tolerated. Occasionally side effects include headache, numbness, and sleepiness. Normal doses are safe during pregnancy and breastfeeding. Pyridoxine is in the vitamin B family of vitamins. It is required by the body to metabolise amino acids, carbohydrates, and lipids. Sources in the diet include meat, fish, fruit, vegetables, and grain.

== Medical uses ==
As a treatment (oral or injection), it is used to treat or prevent pyridoxine deficiency, sideroblastic anaemia, pyridoxine-dependent epilepsy, certain metabolic disorders, side effects of isoniazid treatment and certain types of mushroom poisoning. Isoniazid is an antibiotic used for the treatment of tuberculosis. Its common side effects include numbness in the hands and feet. Co-treatment with vitamin B_{6} alleviates the numbness. Pyridoxine-dependent epilepsy is a type of rare infant epilepsy that does not improve with typical anti-seizure medications.

Pyridoxine in combination with doxylamine is used as a treatment for morning sickness in pregnant women.

== Side effects ==
It is usually well tolerated, though overdose toxicity is possible. Occasionally side effects include headache, numbness, and sleepiness. Pyridoxine overdose can cause a peripheral sensory neuropathy characterized by poor coordination, numbness, and decreased sensation to touch, temperature, and vibration. Healthy human blood levels of pyridoxine are 2.1–21.7 ng/mL. Normal doses are safe during pregnancy and breastfeeding.

== Mechanism ==
Pyridoxine is in the vitamin B family of vitamins. It is required by the body to make amino acids, carbohydrates, and lipids. Sources in the diet include fruit, vegetables, and grain. It is also required for muscle phosphorylase activity associated with glycogen metabolism.

== Metabolism ==
The half-life of pyridoxine varies according to different sources: one source suggests that the half-life of pyridoxine is up to 20 days, while another source indicates half-life of vitamin B_{6} is in range of 25 to 33 days. After considering the different sources, it can be concluded that the half-life of pyridoxine is typically measured in several weeks.

== History ==
Pyridoxine was discovered in 1934, isolated in 1938, and first made in 1939. It is on the World Health Organization's List of Essential Medicines. Pyridoxine is available both as a generic medication and over the counter product. Foods, such as breakfast cereal have pyridoxine added in some countries.
