= Max Day =

Australian ecologist

Maxwell Frank Cooper Day AO FAA (21 December 1915 – 31 July 2017) was an Australian ecologist and the oldest living Fellow of the Australian Academy of Science. Born in Sydney, New South Wales, he turned 100 in December 2015. He is well known for his work on myxomatosis and the myxoma virus in the 1940s in conjunction with Professor Frank Fenner.

Day studied science at the University of Sydney, graduating BSc and being awarded the university medal in 1937. He completed a PhD at Harvard in 1941 as a Lehman Fellow, and worked for the Australian Government in Washington DC where he joined CSIRO in 1944. He was elected a Fellow of the Australian Academy of Science in 1956.

He served as the first Chief of the CSIRO Division of Forest Research from 1976 to 1980.

His last published work was written when he was aged 97. He died aged 101 on 31 July 2017 in Canberra.

The Max Day Environmental Science Fellowship Award is named in honour of Dr. Day. It is an annual award of up to $20,000 per recipient, supporting PhD students or early-career researchers in their work. The funding covers research expenses, educational courses, and travel costs. By sponsoring this award, Dr. Day recognized the support he received as a young researcher.
