= Prenatal vitamin =

Vitamin and mineral supplements

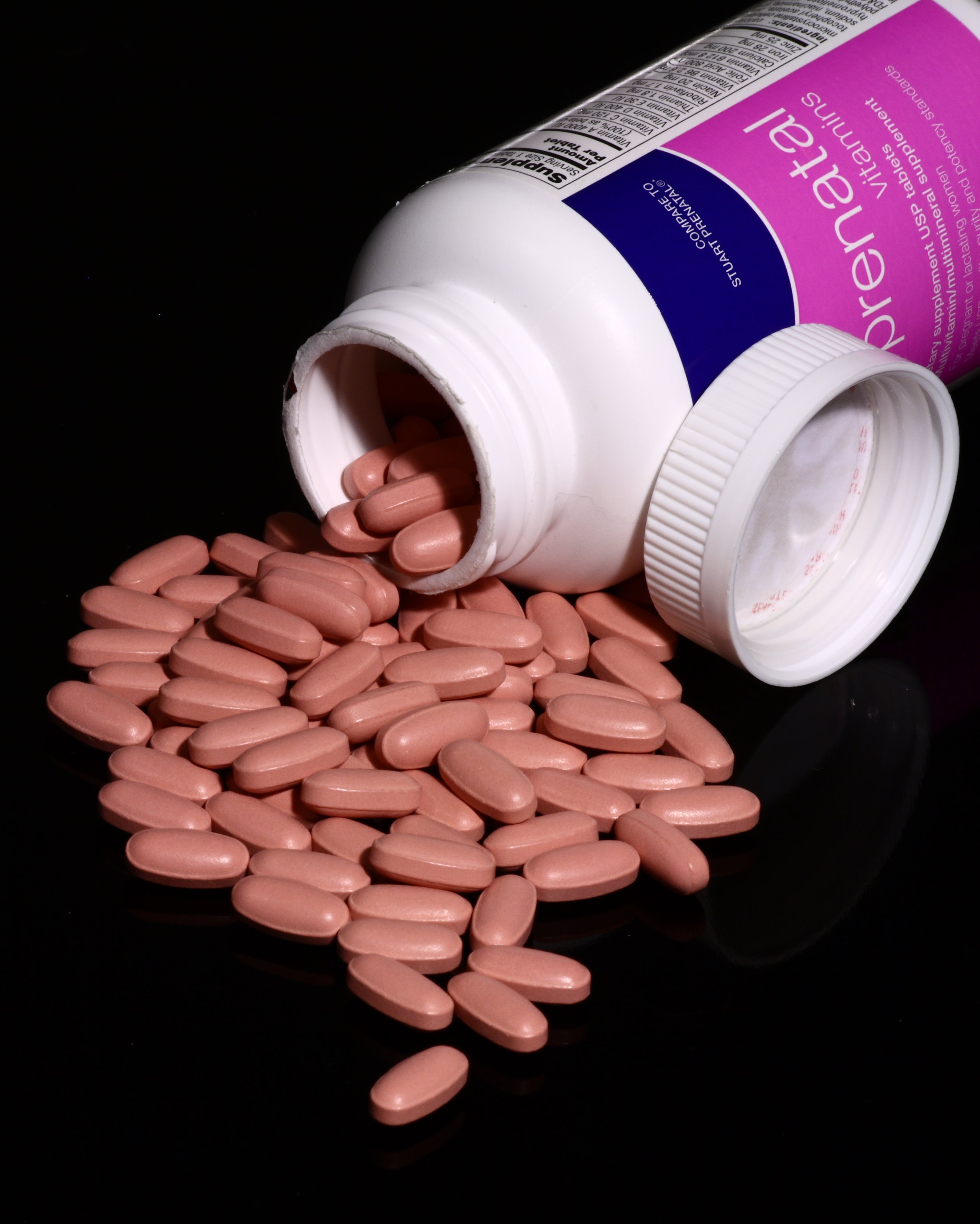
Prenatal vitamins

Prenatal vitamins, also known as prenatal supplements, are vitamin and mineral supplements intended to be taken before and during pregnancy and during postnatal lactation. Although not intended to replace a healthy diet, prenatal vitamins provide women of childbearing age with nutrients recognized by various health organizations including the American Dietetic Association as helpful for a healthy pregnancy outcome. It may be appropriate to start taking prenatal vitamins once the woman enters childbearing age, however if a person is not pregnant or planning to become pregnant the Mayo Clinic does not recommend taking these supplements. Prenatal vitamins are similar to other multivitamins but do contain different amounts of specific nutrients to better suit the needs of an expecting mother.

== Customizations ==
Vitamins and minerals such as folic acid, calcium, and iron are in higher concentrations, while nutrients such as vitamin A are reduced to reflect the current understanding of the role that these compounds play in fetal development.

The increased dosage of folic acid or folates reflects the American Dietetic Associations position that women should consume "400 μg per day of synthetic folic acid from fortified foods (cereals and other grains), supplements or both, in addition to consuming folate from foods in a varied diet." Taking the appropriate amount of folic acid before conception can reduce or prevent the incidence of neural tube defects by as much as 70%. The recommendation to start folic acid before conception is supported by a meta-analysis of 41 studies, but is beneficial after conception as well. Often prenatal vitamins also have a reduced dosage of vitamins that may be detrimental to the fetus when taken in high doses (such as vitamin A).

Many prenatal manufacturers have chosen to include the omega-3 fatty acid, docosahexaenoic acid (DHA) in their product, either as an ingredient in the formula or as a complementary softgel. Although explicitly in many formulas to support neural development, the omega-3 fatty acids are used by both mother and fetus to create the phospholipid bilayer that makes up cell membranes.

L-arginine has tentative evidence of benefit in reducing intrauterine growth restriction.

== Side effects ==
Many women have difficulty tolerating prenatal vitamins or experience constipation as a result of the high iron content. Due to tolerance challenges, the prenatal vitamin industry has developed a multitude of dosage forms to meet the needs and tolerances of expecting mothers. The most common form of prenatal vitamin is the compressed tablet, which is available through all channels and at various quality levels. Category leaders utilize this as the dosage form of choice. Other organizations within the category offer products in a variety of dosage forms such as liquids, prenatal vitamin soft chews, vitamin chewables, and even jellied prenatal vitamins.

== Availability ==
Prenatal vitamins are available both over the counter in retail stores as well as by prescription from medical professionals. Although prescription vitamins are often covered by insurance, the relative potency of prescription-grade products is typically not significantly different from that available through retail. Differences in prescription versus retail vitamins do, however, exist in consistency and quality level, as well as the relative bioavailability of some specific ingredients. For example, many prescription prenatal vitamins will contain a more bioavailable form of folate, 5-methyltetrahydrofolate (5-MTHF). Doses of folic acid over 1 mg are prescription only. The amount of non-prescription prenatal vitamins needed to achieve this dose may have too much vitamin A and lead to fetal toxicity.

In addition, the U.S. Army currently provides female soldiers with optional prenatal supplements to combat high anemia rates in female soldiers.
