= Mabry =

Mabry may refer to:

== Surname ==
- Dale Mabry (1891–1922), American World War I aviator
  - Dale Mabry Highway, Florida
  - Dale Mabry Field, Florida
- Edward Mabry (1897–1989), American author, poet, and chemical tycoon
- George L. Mabry, Jr. (1917–1990), general in U.S. Army
- Harry Mabry (1932–2004), television news director and anchor in Alabama
- Hinche Parham Mabry (1829–1884), Confederate cavalry brigade commander in the American Civil War
- John Mabry (born 1970), Major League Baseball player
- John P. Mabry (born 1969), Texas politician
- Joseph Alexander Mabry (1796–1837), American politician from Tennessee
- Joseph Alexander Mabry Jr. (1826–1882), American businessman from Tennessee
- Lynn Mabry (born 1958), American singer
- Mark Mabry, American photographer and journalist
- Mike Mabry (born 1980), American football player
- Milton H. Mabry, Lieutenant Governor of Florida 1885-1889
- Moss Mabry (1918–2006), costume designer
- Nathan Mabry (born 1978), American artist
- Thomas J. Mabry (1884–1962), New Mexico politician and judge
- Tommie Mabry (born 1987), American author and activity
- Tyler Mabry (born 1996), American football player

== Other ==
- Camp Mabry, a military installation in Austin, Texas
- Mabry-Hazen House, an historic house and museum in Knoxville, Tennessee
- Mabry Mill, a grist mill on the Blue Ridge Parkway in Virginia
- Justice Mabry (disambiguation)
