= Edward Mabry =

American poet

Edward Loughlin Mabry (1897–1989), was an American writer, poet, and chemical tycoon.

== Chemical tycoon ==
During World War I Edward Mabry joined the Vick Chemical Company, founded by Lunsford Richardson in 1898. Vicks today is best known for its VapoRub, DayQuil, and NyQuil brands, and it was once home to Icy Hot and Oil of Olay as well. In 1948, after 32 years with the company in sales and advertising, Mabry was named president. In 1957 he also became chairman of the board of directors. Vicks became Richardson Merrell Inc. after merging with Marion Merrell Dow, and in 1985 was sold to Procter & Gamble, where it remains as a brand and product division.

== Mabry the writer ==
In addition to his achievements in the business world, Mabry wrote eighteen books, among them collections of poetry and sayings. His first book, Maybryana, was a cinquain-centric book of poetry. It was followed the next year by Maybryettes, a sequel. Further titles included Elm Leaves, Elm Leaves Keep Falling, Sail On! and The Velvet Touch. All 18 were published in the United States by Pond-Ekberg.
