= Turpentine =

Liquid distilled from pine resin

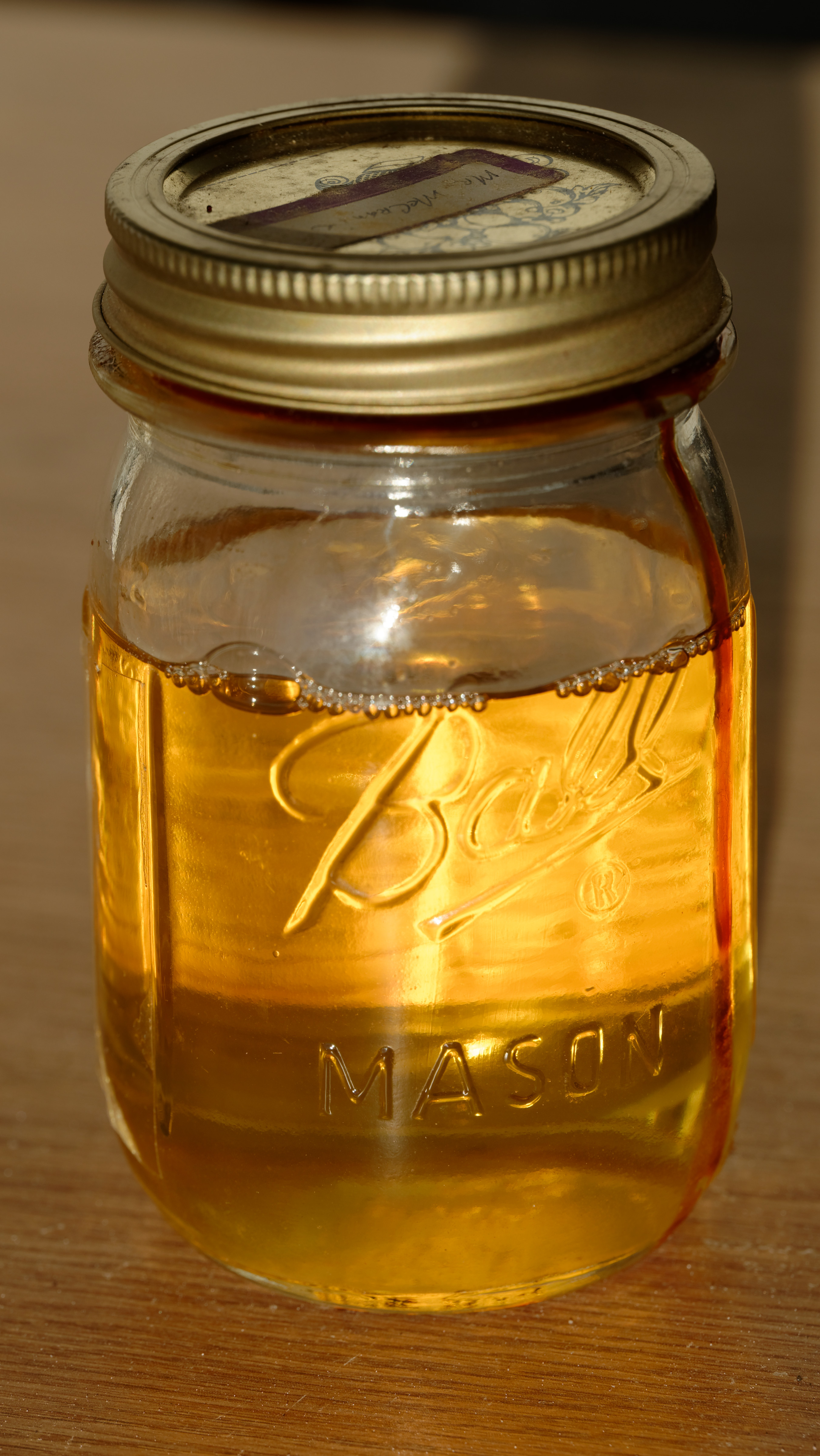
- Turpentine distilled at the Georgia Museum of Agriculture & Historic Village as it was done circa 1900

Identifiers
CAS Number	9005-90-7
ECHA InfoCard	100.029.407
EC Number	232-688-5
PubChem CID	48418114
UNII	XJ6RUH0O4G
CompTox Dashboard (EPA)	DTXSID6027680

Properties
Chemical formula	C_{10}H_{16}
Molar mass	136.238 g·mol^{−1}
Appearance	Viscous liquid
Odor	Resinous
Melting point	−55 °C (−67 °F; 218 K)
Boiling point	154 °C (309 °F; 427 K)
Solubility in water	20 mg/L

Hazards
NFPA 704 (fire diamond)	1 3 0
Flash point	35 °C (95 °F; 308 K)
Autoignition temperature	220 °C (428 °F; 493 K)
- Except where otherwise noted, data are given for materials in their standard state (at 25 °C [77 °F], 100 kPa). Infobox references

Turpentine (which is also called spirit of turpentine, oil of turpentine, terebenthine, terebenthene, terebinthine and, colloquially, turps) is a fluid obtainable by the distillation of resin harvested from living trees, mainly pines. Principally used as a specialized solvent, it is also a source of material for organic syntheses.

Turpentine is composed of terpenes, primarily the monoterpenes α-pinene and β-pinene, with lesser amounts of carene, camphene, limonene, and terpinolene. Nowadays, turpentine is rarely the product of distillation of pine resin, but is a byproduct of pulping. Pulping is achieved by two processes, the kraft process and the sulfite process. The turpentines obtained from these two processes differ in their chemical compositions. The sulfite process gives a product that is rich in cymene, whereas the kraft process gives a pinene-rich product.

Substitutes include white spirit or other petroleum distillates, although the constituent chemicals are very different.

== Etymology ==
The word turpentine derives (via French and Latin) from the Greek word τερεβινθίνη, terebinthine in English, in turn the feminine form (to conform to the feminine gender of the Greek word, which means 'resin') of an adjective (τερεβίνθινος) derived from the Greek noun τερέβινθος for the terebinth tree.

Although the word originally referred to the resinous exudate of terebinth trees (e.g. Chios turpentine, Cyprus turpentine, and Persian turpentine), it now refers to that of coniferous trees, namely crude turpentine (e.g. Venice turpentine is the oleoresin of larch), or the volatile oil part thereof, namely oil (spirit) of turpentine; the latter usage is much more common today.

== Source trees ==
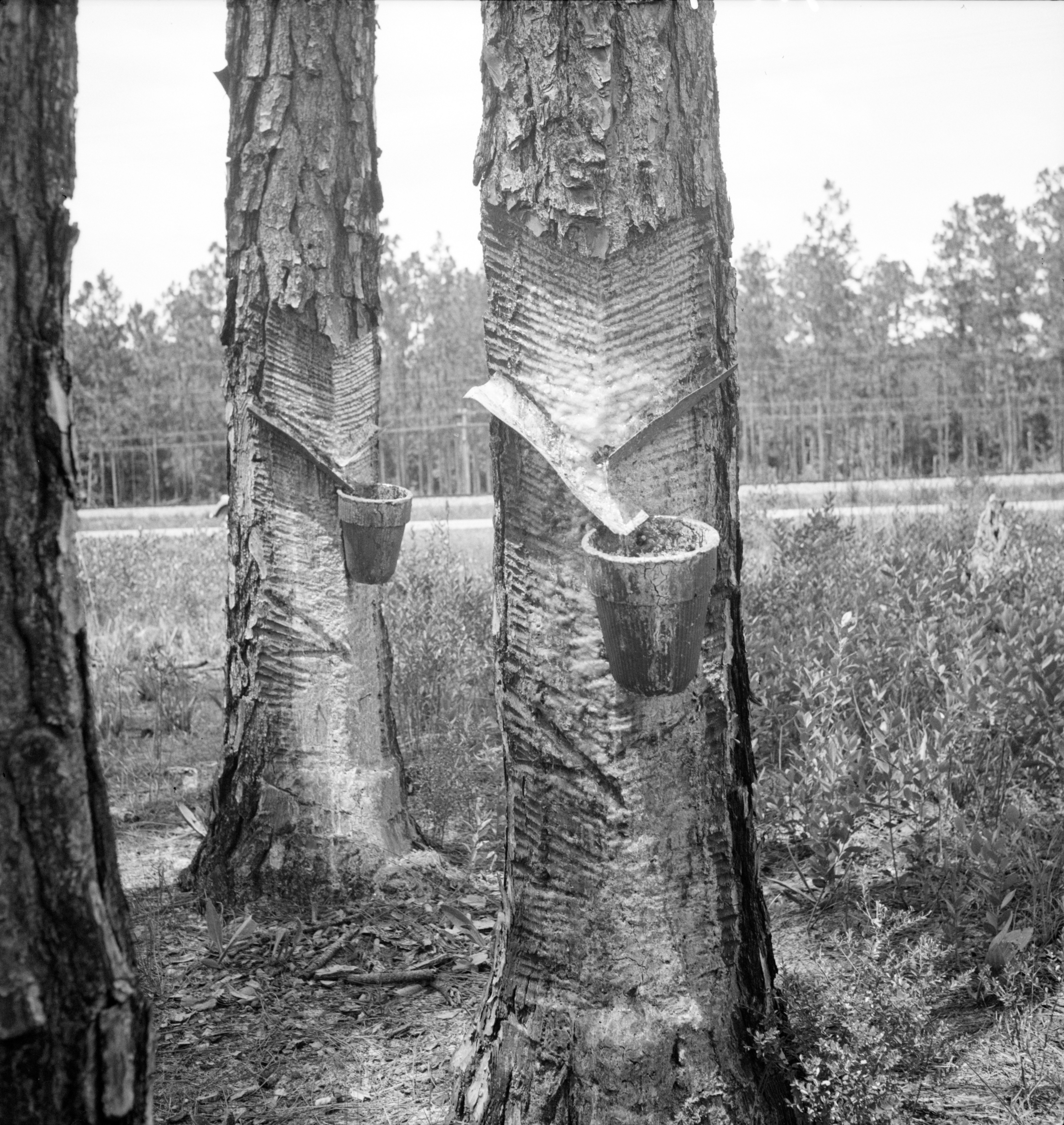
"Herty system" in use on turpentine trees in Northern Florida, circa 1936

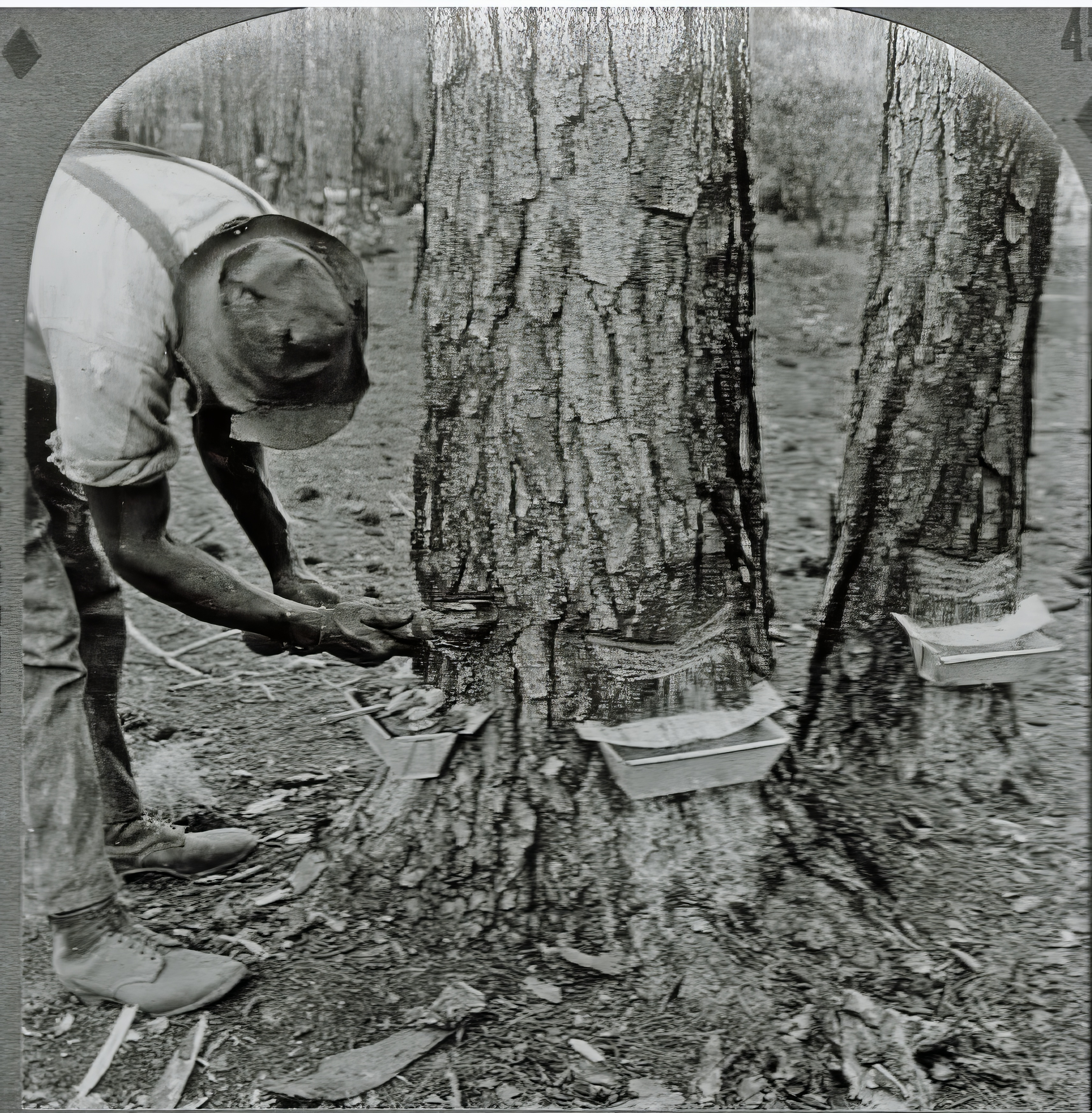
Chipping a turpentine tree in Georgia (US), circa 1906–1920

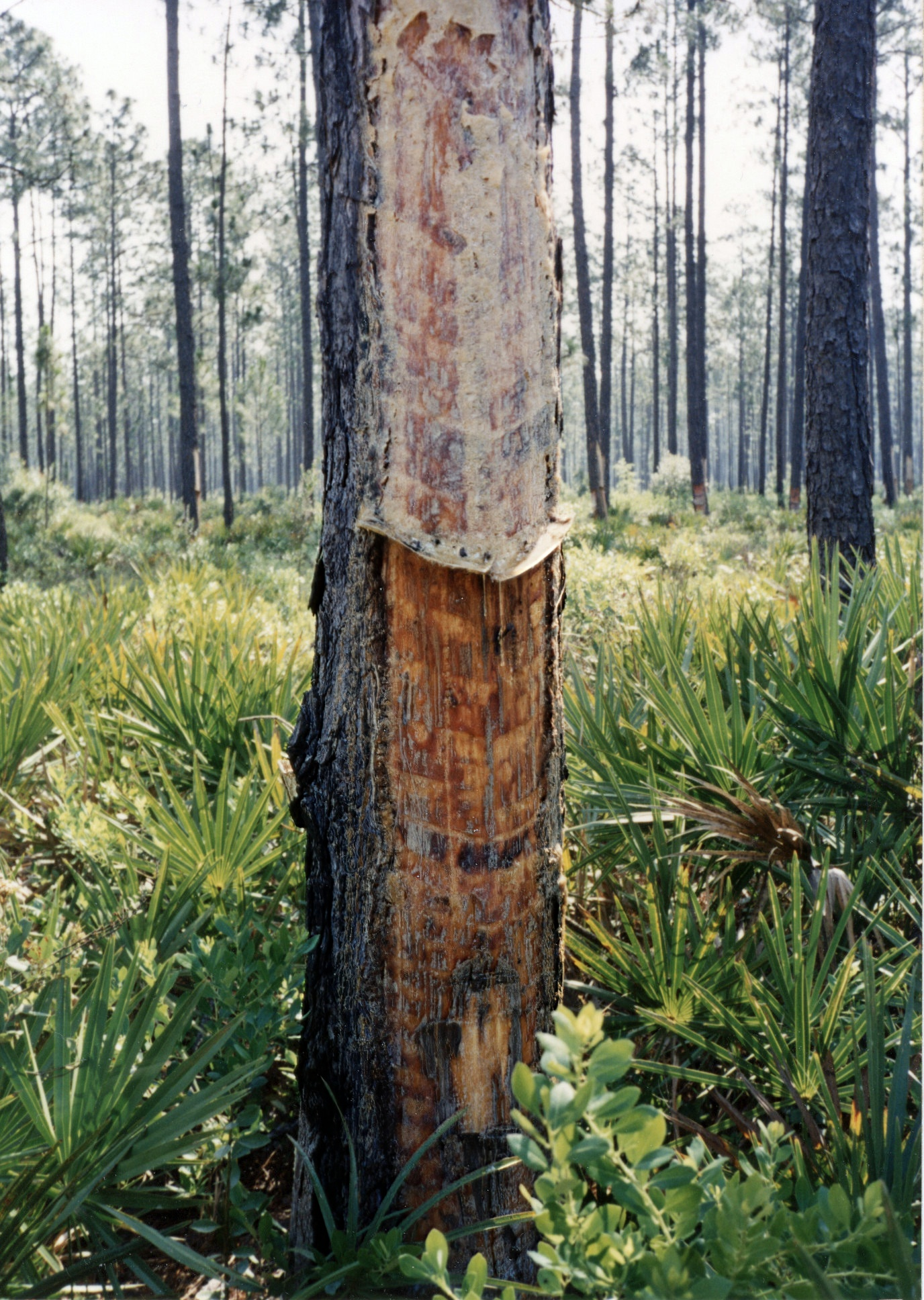
"Cat face" on a pine tree

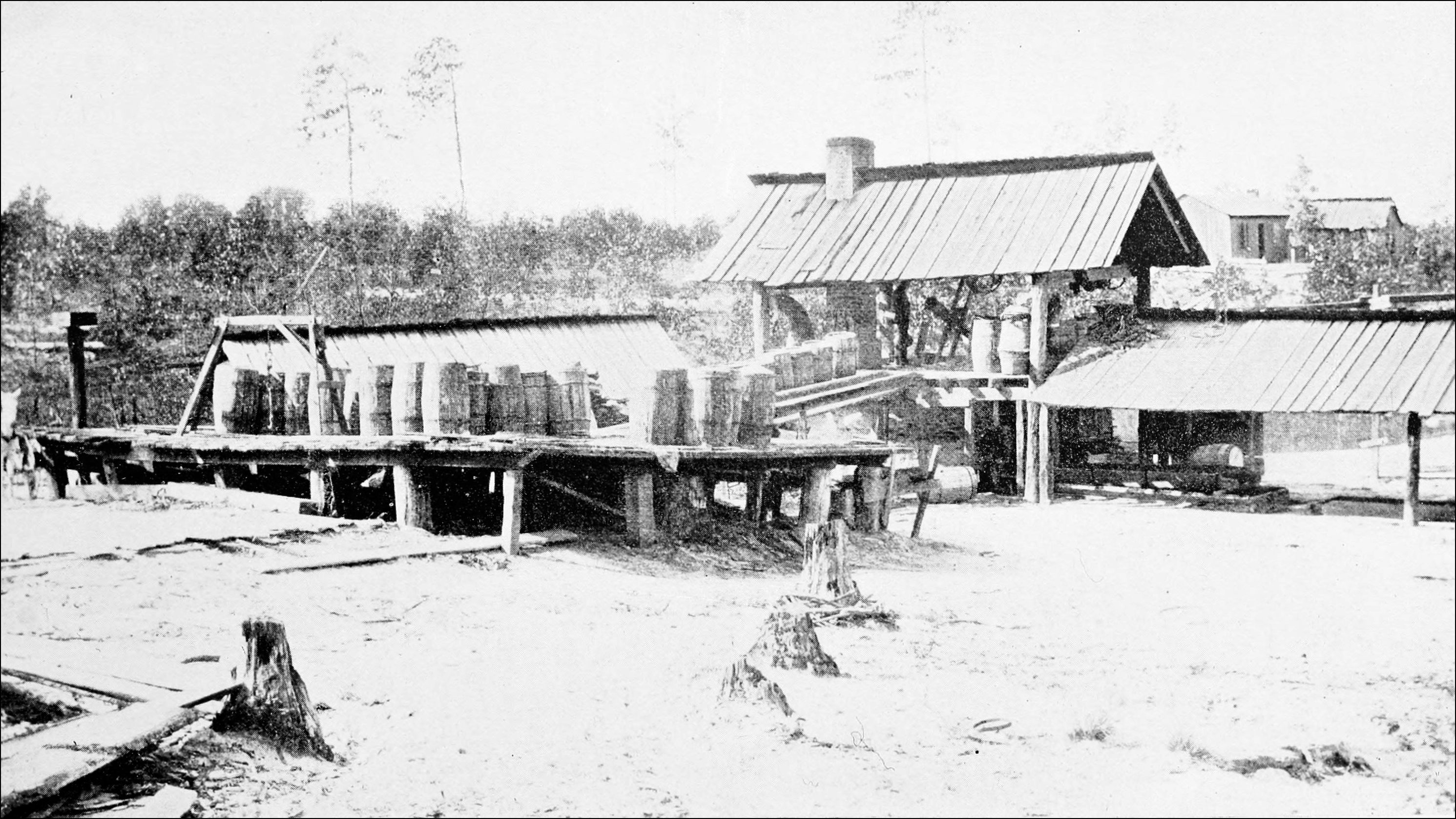
Turpentine distillery at Manlyn, North Carolina

Important pines for turpentine production include maritime pine (Pinus pinaster), Aleppo pine (Pinus halepensis), Masson's pine (Pinus massoniana), Sumatran pine (Pinus merkusii), longleaf pine (Pinus palustris), loblolly pine (Pinus taeda), slash pine (Pinus elliottii), and ponderosa pine (Pinus ponderosa).

== Converting crude turpentine to oil of turpentine ==
Crude turpentine collected from the trees may be evaporated by steam distillation in a copper still. Molten rosin remains in the still bottoms after turpentine has been distilled out. Such turpentine is called gum turpentine. The term gum turpentine may also refer to crude turpentine, which may cause some confusion.

Turpentine may alternatively be extracted from destructive distillation of pine wood, such as shredded pine stumps, roots, and slash, using the light end of the heavy naphtha fraction (boiling between 90 and 115 °C or 195 and 240 °F) from a crude-oil refinery. Such turpentine is called wood turpentine. Multi-stage counter-current extraction is commonly used so that fresh naphtha first contacts wood leached in previous stages and naphtha laden with turpentine from previous stages contacts fresh wood before vacuum distillation to recover naphtha from the turpentine. Leached wood is steamed for additional naphtha recovery prior to burning for energy recovery.

=== Sulfate turpentine ===
When producing chemical wood pulp from pines or other coniferous trees, sulfate turpentine may be condensed from the gas generated in kraft process pulp digesters. The average yield of crude sulfate turpentine is 5–10 kg/t pulp. Unless burned at the mill for energy production, sulfate turpentine may require additional treatment measures to remove traces of sulfur compounds.

== Uses ==
=== Solvent ===
As a solvent, turpentine is used for thinning oil-based paints, for producing varnishes, and as a raw material for the chemical industry. Its use as a solvent in industrialized nations has largely been replaced by the much cheaper turpentine substitutes obtained from petroleum such as white spirit. A solution of turpentine and beeswax or carnauba wax has long been used as a furniture wax.

=== Lighting ===
Spirits of turpentine, called camphine, were burned in lamps with glass chimneys in the 1830s through the 1860s. It produced a bright light but had a strong odor. Turpentine was also blended with grain alcohol to create burning fluid. Both were used as domestic lamp fuels, replacing whale oil as the dominant lamp fuel until the advent of kerosene, gas lighting, and electric lights.

=== Source of organic compounds ===
Turpentine is also used as a source of raw materials in the synthesis of fragrant chemical compounds. Commercially used camphor, linalool, alpha-terpineol, and geraniol are all usually produced from alpha-pinene and beta-pinene, which are two of the chief chemical components of turpentine. These pinenes are separated and purified by distillation. The mixture of diterpenes and triterpenes that is left as residue after turpentine distillation is sold as rosin.

=== Niche uses ===
- Because it is naturally a pine pitch thinner, it will remove pitch from clothing while other common solvents may not do as well.
- Turpentine is also added to many cleaning and sanitary products due to its antiseptic properties and its "clean scent".
- Honda motorcycles, first manufactured in 1946, ran on a blend of gasoline and turpentine, due to the scarcity of gasoline in Japan following World War II. The French Emeraude rocket uses a similar fuel mixture. Turpentine has also been researched as a potential biofuel for mixing into gasoline.
- In his book If Only They Could Talk, veterinarian and author James Herriot describes the use of the reaction of turpentine with resublimed iodine to "drive the iodine into the tissue", or perhaps just impress the watching customer with a spectacular treatment (a dense cloud of purple smoke).

== Safety and health considerations ==
NFPA 704 safety square
- 1 3 0

Turpentine is highly flammable, so much so that it has been considered as an automotive fuel.

Turpentine was added extensively into gin during the Gin Craze.

Turpentine's vapour can irritate the skin and eyes, damage the lungs and respiratory system, as well as the central nervous system when inhaled, and cause damage to the renal system when ingested, among other things. Ingestion can cause burning sensations, abdominal pain, nausea, vomiting, confusion, convulsions, diarrhea, tachycardia, unconsciousness, respiratory failure, and chemical pneumonia.

The US Occupational Safety and Health Administration (OSHA) has set the legal limit (permissible exposure limit) for turpentine exposure in the workplace as 100 ppm (560 mg/m^{3}) over an 8-hour workday. The same threshold was adopted by the National Institute for Occupational Safety and Health (NIOSH) as the recommended exposure limit (REL). At levels of 800 ppm (4480 mg/m^{3}), turpentine is immediately dangerous to life and health.

=== Folk medicine ===
Turpentine and petroleum distillates such as coal oil and kerosene, were used in folk medicine for abrasions and wounds, as a treatment for lice, and when mixed with animal fat, as a chest rub or inhaler for nasal and throat ailments. Vicks chest rubs still contain turpentine in their formulations, although not as an active ingredient.

Turpentine, now understood to be dangerous for consumption, was a common medicine among seamen during the Age of Discovery. It was one of several products carried aboard Ferdinand Magellan's fleet during the first circumnavigation of the globe. Taken internally, it was used as a treatment for intestinal parasites. This is dangerous, due to the chemical's toxicity.

Turpentine enemas, a very harsh purgative, had formerly been used for stubborn constipation or impaction. They were also given punitively to political dissenters in post-independence Argentina.

== See also ==
- Galipot – Resin of turpentine obtained from pine trees
- McCranie's Turpentine Still – a historic site in Willacoochee, Georgia
- Naval stores – Term for resins used in shipbuilding
- Patent medicine – over-the-counter "proprietary" medications
- Retsina – Greek wine flavored with Aleppo pine resin
- Russia leather – a water-resistant leather curried after tanning with a birch oil distillate similar to turpentine
