= Anthony R. Michaelis =

German-born science journalist and publisher (1916–2007)

Anthony R. Michaelis (22 August 1916 – 18 October 2007) was a science journalist and publisher.

He was born Kurt Otto Adolf Michaelis, a doctor's son, in Berlin on 22 August 1916, and educated at the Falk Real Gymnasium. Although baptised a Lutheran, he had three Jewish grandparents, which meant that after Hitler came to power in 1933 he would not be allowed to study science - so his father sent him to London.

Michaelis studied aeronautical engineering at the Imperial College of the University of London before switching to Chemistry. He went on to obtain a doctorate on "The Dehydrogenation of Alicyclic Compounds and Terpenic Ketones in the Liquid Phase", while lecturing at Sheffield University under Sir Patrick Linstead. He was interned as an 'enemy alien' in England in May 1940 and then Canada, where he formed lasting friendships with Klaus Fuchs, Max Perutz, Hermann Bondi and Tommy Gold. After he returned to Britain in December 1940, he joined the Auxiliary Fire Service whilst working as a chemist in a paint factory. After graduation, he became chief chemist at Milton Antiseptic.

After World War II Michaelis worked for the British Intelligence Objectives Committee, which investigated enemy scientific developments, and in 1946 he married Ann Aikman, with whom he was to have three children. His distinguished career as a science journalist and editor spanned several activities including the “BIOS project”, technical writing at “CIBA” and “International Telecommunication Union” in Switzerland. Later he became a scientific film author in Australia, editor of the British magazine Discovery, science correspondent for The Daily Telegraph where he wrote daily reports on science and technology from 1969 to 1973. He was also the founding editor and publisher of Interdisciplinary Science Reviews.

Whilst at the Daily Telegraph, in 1968, Michaelis was the first person to coin and use the term "Pulsar" to describe the discovery of Jocelyn Bell Burnell and Antony Hewish of the "Pulsating Radio star" in 1967.

Michaelis became known as an expert on the subject of scientific cinematography. From 1950 to 1954 he worked at the University of Sydney and during this time wrote much of the textbook Research Films (1956, US). The National Library of Australia holds material related to the publication of this book.

He died in Heidelberg in 2007.

== Books ==
- Overall Reports (editor), 1947
- Research Films, 1956
- Discovery (editor), 1955
- From Semaphore to Satellite, 1960
- The Scientific Temper, 2001
