= SS Lunsford Richardson =

World War II Liberty ship of the United States

History

United States
- Name: Lunsford Richardson
- Namesake: Lunsford Richardson
- Ordered: as type (EC2-S-C1) hull, MC hull 2374
- Builder: J.A. Jones Construction, Brunswick, Georgia
- Cost: $1,031,122
- Yard number: 159
- Way number: 1
- Laid down: 2 August 1944
- Launched: 9 September 1944
- Sponsored by: Mrs. E.W. Stetson
- Completed: 22 September 1944
- Identification: Call Signal: KSMT
- Fate: Laid up in National Defense Reserve Fleet, Wilmington, North Carolina, 15 April 1948; Sold for scrapping, 12 April 1961

General characteristics
- Class & type: Liberty ship; type EC2-S-C1, standard
- Tonnage: 10,865 LT DWT; 7,176 GRT
- Displacement: 3,380 long tons (3,434 t) (light); 14,245 long tons (14,474 t) (max)
- Length: 441 feet 6 inches (135 m) oa; 416 feet (127 m) pp; 427 feet (130 m) lwl
- Beam: 57 feet (17 m)
- Draft: 27 ft 9.25 in (8.4646 m)
- Installed power: 2 × Oil fired 450 °F (232 °C) boilers, operating at 220 psi (1,500 kPa); 2,500 hp (1,900 kW)
- Propulsion: 1 × triple-expansion steam engine, (manufactured by General Machinery Corp., Hamilton, Ohio); 1 × screw propeller
- Speed: 11.5 knots (21.3 km/h; 13.2 mph)
- Capacity: 562,608 cubic feet (15,931 m^{3}) (grain); 499,573 cubic feet (14,146 m^{3}) (bale)
- Complement: 38–62 USMM; 21–40 USNAG
- Armament: Varied by ship; Bow-mounted 3-inch (76 mm)/50-caliber gun; Stern-mounted 4-inch (102 mm)/50-caliber gun; 2–8 × single 20-millimeter (0.79 in) Oerlikon anti-aircraft (AA) cannons and/or, 2–8 × 37-millimeter (1.46 in) M1 AA guns

SS Lunsford Richardson was a Liberty ship built in the United States during World War II. She was named after Lunsford Richardson, a pharmacist and founder of the Vick Chemical Company.

== Construction ==
Lunsford Richardson was laid down on 2 August 1944, under a United States Maritime Commission (MARCOM) contract, MC hull 2374, by J.A. Jones Construction, Brunswick, Georgia; she was sponsored by Mrs. E.W. Stetson, and launched on 9 September 1944.

== History ==
She was allocated to William J. Rountree Company, on 22 September 1944. On 11 October 1947, she was laid up in the National Defense Reserve Fleet in Wilmington, North Carolina. On 12 April 1961, she was sold for $51,515, to Northern Metal Company, for scrapping. She was removed from the fleet on 21 April 1961.

== Bibliography ==
- "Jones Construction, Brunswick GA". ShipbuildingHistory.com. 13 October 2010.
- "Liberty Ships – World War II".
- Maritime Administration. "Lunsford Richardson". Ship History Database Vessel Status Card. U.S. Department of Transportation, Maritime Administration. Archived from the original on 12 December 2019.
- Davies, James (May 2004). "Specifications (As-Built)" (PDF). p. 23.
- "SS Lunsford Richardson".
