= Marion Merrell Dow =

US pharmaceutical company

- Industry: Pharmaceutical
- Founded: 1950 (Marion Laboratories); 1989 (Marion Merrell Dow)
- Defunct: 1996
- Fate: Acquired by Hoechst AG to create Hoechst Marion Roussel
- Successor: Sanofi
- Headquarters: Kansas City, Missouri

Marion Merrell Dow and its predecessor Marion Laboratories was a U.S. pharmaceutical company based in Kansas City, Missouri, from 1950 until 1996.

The company specialized in bringing to market drugs that had been discovered but unmarketed by other companies including Cardizem which treats arrhythmias and high blood pressure, Carafate (an ulcer treatment), Gaviscon (an antacid), Seldane (a withdrawn antihistamine), Nicorette (anti-smoking gum) and Cepacol mouthwash.

The company operating out of its headquarters at 9300 Ward Parkway was a springboard for its founder Ewing Marion Kauffman to start the Kansas City Royals baseball team.

== History ==
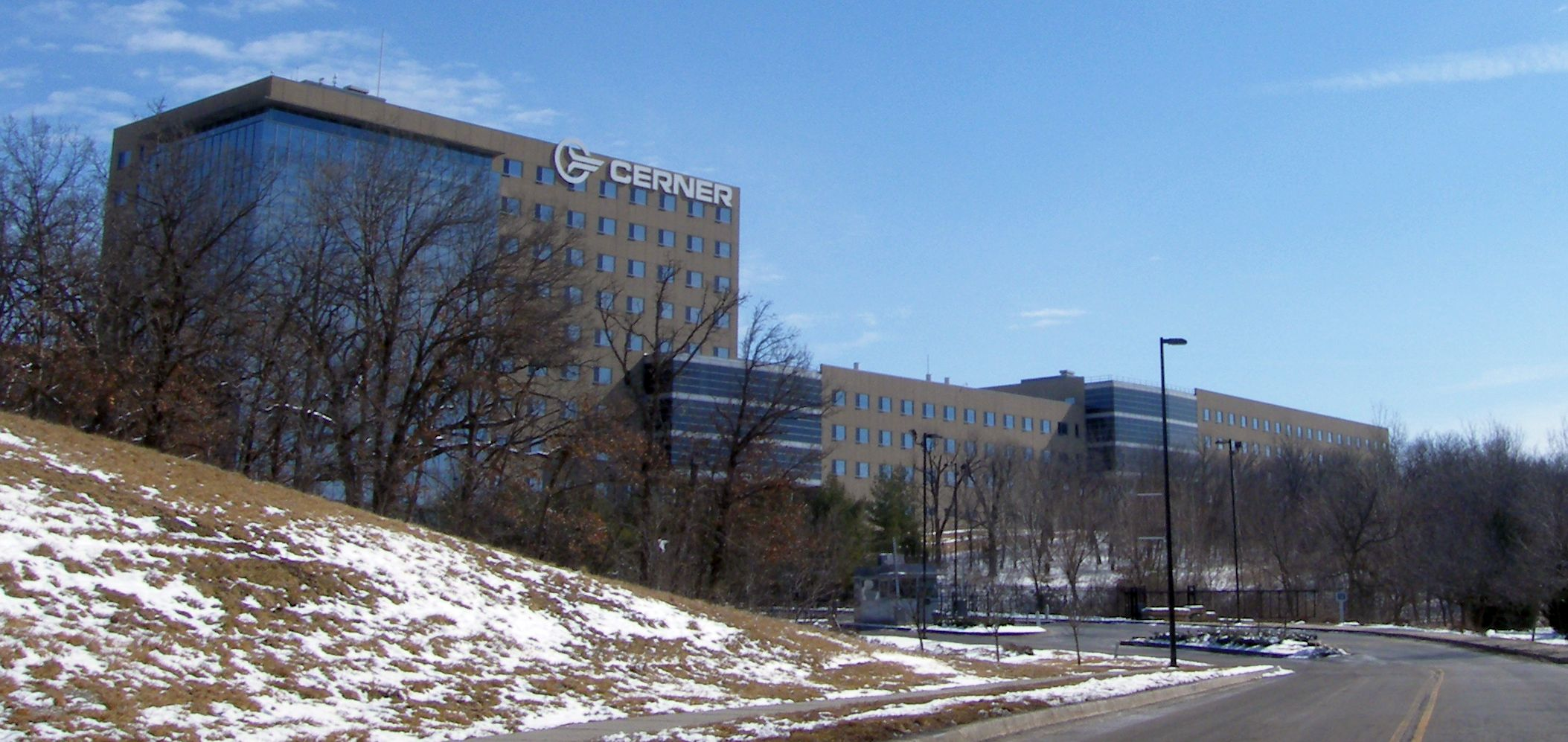
Marion's office space in Kansas City was taken over in 2006 by Cerner Corporation

=== Richardson-Merrell ===
The company traces its roots back to 1828 when William S. Merrell opened the Western Market Drug Store at Sixth Street and Western Row (now Central Avenue) in downtown Cincinnati, Ohio. Merrell expanded into the wholesale drug business. Following his death in 1880 his sons formed the William S. Merrell Chemical Company.

In the 1930s, it merged with a company started by Lunsford Richardson to become Richardson-Merrell. Richardson's most notable product was Vicks VapoRub.

In 1958, Richardson-Merrell acquired the English company Milton Antiseptic Ltd.

A team at William S. Merrell Chemical Company led by Frank Palopoli synthesized clomifene in 1956 (to stimulate ovulation); after its biological activity was confirmed a patent was filed and issued in November 1959. Scientists at Merrell had previously synthesized chlorotrianisene and ethamoxytriphetol.

==== Thalidomide ====
One of Richardson-Merrell's best-known incidents revolved around its efforts to introduce thalidomide into the US market in the 1950s and 1960s under the brand name "Kevadon". The drug was already highly popular in Europe as a sedative and antiemetic for elderly patients. Although neither tested nor approved for use during pregnancy, its effectiveness and absence of significant side-effects led many physicians to prescribe it to pregnant women. Richardson-Merrell submitted their new drug application (NDA) to the U.S. Food and Drug Administration on September 8, 1960. During the application process, Richardson-Merrell asked the FDA for quick approval of the drug, and distributed 2.5 million tablets of thalidomide to 1,200 American doctors with the understanding that the drug was under investigation, a preemptive marketing strategy that was permissible at the time under existing regulations. Nearly 20,000 patients received the drug. Reviewing pharmacologist Frances Oldham Kelsey, who had joined the FDA just a month before the application's arrival, repeatedly denied the company's requests for permission to market the drug, citing an insufficient number of controlled studies to establish risks. When studies revealed that 10,000 children worldwide had been born with severe birth defects from the drug, Merrell withdrew its application and recalled the remaining unconsumed tablets from doctors offices around the country. Ultimately, 17 children in the United States were born with defects. For correctly denying the application despite the pressure from Richardson-Merrell, Kelsey eventually received the President's Award for Distinguished Federal Civilian Service at a 1962 ceremony with President John F. Kennedy.

=== Merrell Dow Pharmaceuticals ===
Dow Chemical acquired controlling interest of the Merrell pharmaceutical division of Richardson-Merrell company in 1980 and it became Merrell Dow Pharmaceuticals.

The former Richardson-Merrell became Richardson-Vicks, Inc. In 1985, Richardson-Vicks was acquired by Procter & Gamble.

==== U.S. Supreme Court cases ====
In the U.S., Merrell Dow Pharmaceuticals was a named party in at least two major United States Supreme Court cases:

- Merrell Dow Pharmaceuticals Inc. v. Thompson, 478 U.S. 804 (1986), involving original jurisdiction
- Daubert v. Merrell Dow Pharmaceuticals 509 U.S. 579 (1993), applied the rules governing expert testimony established by the Federal Rules of Evidence to the admission of scientific evidence at trials conducted in federal courts

=== Marion Merrell Dow ===
In 1989, Dow Chemical acquired 67 percent interest of Marion Laboratories, which was renamed Marion Merrell Dow. Among the products Merrell Dow brought that would be shortly marketed were Seldane, Lorelco, Nicorette and Cepacol. The merger was considered a good fit because of Marion Laboratories strong sales force and Merrell Dow's strong research and development capabilities.

At the time Marion Laboratories was outperforming all other drug company stocks by 2½ times. Marion had the highest sales and the highest profit per employee of any company traded on the New York Stock Exchange. Dow's initial offer was $38 a share in cash, or $2.2 billion, for the 39 percent of Marion's 150 million shares with an option to raise the stake to 67 percent by 1992. The offer made 300 of Marion's employees millionaires. The deal created the fifth largest drug company in the United States in terms of sales.

Although controlled by Dow the new company continued to trade on Marion Laboratories' old New York Stock Exchange ticker symbol "MKC."

==== Marion Laboratories ====
Ewing Kauffman, a former pharmaceutical salesman in Kansas City, Missouri started the company in 1950 in the basement of his Kansas City home by selling calcium supplements made from crushed oyster shells which he made in his home and starting with $5,000 in capital. Kauffman later said he used his middle name for the company to avoid the impression that it was a one-person operation.

As the company expanded, Kauffman offered employees share options and profit sharing..

Rather than researching products, the company adopted a policy of buying existing products and reformulating them for market.

In 1964, it formally incorporated as Marion Laboratories, Inc.

In the 1980s, it marketed Silvadene (a burn cream), Ditropan (treatment for bladder spasms), Nitro-Bid (chest pain treatment), ARD and Bac-T-Screen (helped identify bacteria), Culturette (used to identify Group A streptococci) and ToxiLab, a drug detection system used to detect drug abuse. In 1989, Marion Laboratories had a gross revenue of $930 million; it was acquired by Dow Chemical and took the name Marion Merrell Dow. By 1994 it had nearly 10,000 employees.

=== Hoechst Marion Roussel ===
In 1995, Hoechst AG of Germany announced plans to buy Dow's increased 71 percent share for $25.75 a share or $7.1 Billion. Hoechst also bought the other outstanding shares. The deal created the world's second largest drug manufacturer at the time (behind Glaxo Wellcome and ahead of Merck & Company).

Hoechst's new pharmaceutical company became Hoechst Marion Roussel and kept its North American headquarters in Kansas City.

=== Sanofi ===
Hoechst in turn later became part of the pharmaceutical and lab assay testing company Aventis in 1999, and subsequently a part of the multinational pharmaceutical company Sanofi.

Sanofi has sold the original Marion Labs Kansas City plant at 10236 Marion Park Drive with Cerner Corporation buying the offices in 2006. In August 2009 the company announced its plans to close the remaining facility altogether.
