= NyQuil =

Brand of medication

- Type: Medication
- Inception: 1966; 60 years ago
- Manufacturer: Vicks

Vicks NyQuil is a brand of over-the-counter medication manufactured by Procter & Gamble intended for the relief of various symptoms of the common cold. All medications within the NyQuil imprint contain sedating antihistamines; they are intended to be taken before sleep. Its daytime counterpart is antihistamine-free DayQuil, formulated to avoid drowsiness. NyQuil is also used as a sleep aid. NyQuil was first marketed in the United States in 1966.

== Products ==
=== NyQuil Cold/Flu Multisymptom Relief ===
The liquid version of NyQuil Cold/Flu Multi-symptom Relief, available in syrup and LiquidCap form. The recommended adult dose contains:

- Acetaminophen (650 mg/30 mL) (pain reliever/fever reducer)
- Dextromethorphan (30 mg/30 mL) (cough suppressant)
- Doxylamine succinate (12.5 mg/30 mL) (antihistamine/hypnotic)

The LiquiCap capsule version has the following active ingredients per pill, half the recommended adult dose:

- Acetaminophen (325 mg/pill) (pain reliever/fever reducer)
- Dextromethorphan (15 mg/pill) (cough suppressant)
- Doxylamine succinate (6.25 mg/pill) (antihistamine/hypnotic)

The liquid version of NyQuil SEVERE Cold/Flu Multi-symptom Relief, available in syrup and LiquidCap form. The recommended adult dose contains:

- Acetaminophen (650 mg/30 mL) (pain reliever/fever reducer)
- Dextromethorphan (20 mg/30 mL) (cough suppressant)
- Doxylamine succinate (12.5 mg/30 mL) (antihistamine/hypnotic)
- Phenylephrine (10 mg/30 mL) (nasal decongestant)

The LiquiCap capsule version has the following active ingredients per pill, half the recommended adult dose:

- Acetaminophen (325 mg/pill) (pain reliever/fever reducer)
- Dextromethorphan (15 mg/pill) (cough suppressant)
- Doxylamine succinate (6.25 mg/pill) (antihistamine/hypnotic)
- Phenylephrine (5 mg/pill) (nasal decongestant)

=== NyQuil D ===
NyQuil D contains pseudoephedrine, a decongestant that in some regions (such as the United States) is now placed behind the counters at pharmacy and other retail stores and must be requested by the customer. It contains the following active ingredients (15 mL is one tablespoon, half the recommended adult dose):

- Acetaminophen (500 mg/15 mL) (pain reliever/fever reducer)
- Dextromethorphan (15 mg/15 mL) (cough suppressant)
- Doxylamine succinate (6.25 mg/15 mL) (antihistamine/hypnotic)
- Pseudoephedrine (30 mg/15 mL) (nasal decongestant)

=== NyQuil Cough ===
Nyquil Cough contains a cough suppressant and antihistamine but no painkiller. Its active ingredients are:

- Dextromethorphan (15 mg/15 mL) (cough suppressant)
- Doxylamine succinate (6.25 mg/15 mL) (antihistamine/hypnotic)

=== NyQuil Sinus ===
Nyquil Sinus's active ingredients are:

- Acetaminophen (pain reliever/fever reducer)
- Doxylamine succinate (antihistamine/hypnotic)
- Phenylephrine (nasal decongestant)

Nyquil Sinus is available as LiquiCaps only.

=== ZzzQuil ===
ZzzQuil is a sleep aid, and is not a treatment for pain or cold/flu symptoms. Its active ingredient is:

- Diphenhydramine 50 mg (antihistamine)

=== Children's NyQuil ===
Children's NyQuil is artificially flavored for easier consumption by children and contains no alcohol. It is available in the syrup form only. Its active ingredients are:

- Chlorpheniramine (antihistamine)

=== Reformulation ===
Until 2006, NyQuil Cold/Flu Multisymptom Relief and NyQuil Sinus contained pseudoephedrine (30 mg/15 mL), a nasal decongestant that also formed the active ingredient in Sudafed. Following the passage of the Combat Methamphetamine Epidemic Act in 2006, in the United States all pseudoephedrine-containing medications must be kept behind a pharmacy counter and all purchases must be logged.

Vicks chose to reformulate NyQuil Sinus in 2006, replacing pseudoephedrine with phenylephrine. However, studies have shown that phenylephrine is no more effective than a placebo. As of 2012, the only NyQuil variety which contains pseudoephedrine is Nyquil D.
