= DayQuil =

Medication product

- Type: Brand
- Industry: Retail
- Founded: 1974; 52 years ago (as Vicks DayCare); 1992; 34 years ago (as DayQuil)
- Products: Medication
- Brands: DayQuil Cough (dextromethorphan); DayQuil Cold & Flu (acetaminophen, dextromethorphan, phenylephrine); DayQuil Severe Cold & Flu (acetaminophen, dextromethorphan, guaifenesin, phenylephrine); DayQuil Mucus Control DM (dextromethorphan, guaifenesin); Dayquil Sinex (acetaminophen, phenylephrine, or oxymetazoline)
- Parent: Vicks

Vicks DayQuil is an over-the-counter combination medication product used for the temporary relief of common cold and flu symptoms. DayQuil is available in several formulations.

DayQuil was introduced in 1974 under the name "Vicks DayCare" and is currently advertised for daytime use because of its non-drowsy active ingredients. The brand name was reintroduced as "DayQuil" in 1992. DayQuil's nighttime counterpart, NyQuil, is also available for the relief of cold and flu symptoms during the night. These products are not intended to cure the common cold or the flu.

== Product selection ==
Selecting a product should depend on the specific symptom presentation of the user. Products should be selected with active ingredients limited only to those symptoms, thereby reducing the risk of over treatment with medications that the user is not showing symptoms for. Additionally, careful note should be taken when purchasing multiple over-the-counter cold and flu medicines because many products may contain the same active ingredient. The potential for overdose increases when consumers are unaware of the duplication of active ingredients in these medicines.

== Research ==
There are conflicting studies showing the effectiveness of over-the-counter cold medicine in reducing cold and flu symptoms. A number of studies have found acetaminophen (alone and in combination) to be effective and a safe treatment for common cold symptoms such as sore throat and body aches. In contrast, a systematic review including 26 randomized controlled trials compared the use of over-the-counter cough medicines with no treatment in children and adults exhibiting cough in the ambulatory or outpatient setting. Among the studies, there was conflicting evidence of the effectiveness of cough medicines containing an antitussive, antihistamine or decongestant in providing better cough resolution outcomes versus no treatment.

== Social and culture ==
=== Recreational use ===
Abuse and recreational use of dextromethorphan have been reported with over-the-counter preparations and can cause euphoric and dissociative effects at higher than recommended doses.

== Warnings ==
=== Products containing acetaminophen ===
There is a risk of severe liver damage with the concurrent use of acetaminophen products and excessive alcohol use (≥3 alcoholic drinks/day depending on body weight). Acetaminophen is an active ingredient of many over-the-counter single ingredient products (e.g. to treat headache), multiple ingredient combination products as well as prescription-only medications written by a physician. Each formulation also varies per dose. When purchasing over-the-counter medications, avoid purchasing multiple products with acetaminophen ingredients. The suggested maximum daily intake of acetaminophen is limited to <4 grams (4,000 mg) daily in adults or <2.6g (2,600 mg) daily in children <12 years of age to reduce the risk of liver damage.

=== Products containing dextromethorphan ===
Those prescribed monoamine oxidase inhibitor (MAO-i) should avoid the use of DayQuil products containing dextromethorphan within 2 weeks to avoid risks of Serotonin Syndrome.
