= Joseph Alexander Mabry =

American politician (1796–1837)

Member of the Tennessee House of Representatives from the Knox County district
- In office 1835–1837

Personal details
- Born: March 19, 1796 Westmoreland County, Virginia, U.S.
- Died: April 19, 1837 (aged 41) Tuscaloosa, Alabama, U.S.
- Cause of death: Stabbing
- Spouse: Alice
- Children: 5, including Joseph
- Occupation: Politician; farmer; militiaman

Joseph Alexander Mabry (March 19, 1796 – April 19, 1837) was an American politician from Tennessee. He served two terms in the Tennessee House of Representatives.

== Early life ==
Joseph Alexander Mabry was born on March 19, 1796, in Westmoreland County, Virginia. One of his ancestors was Robert de Mowbray. At a young age, he moved with his family to Tennessee and settled in Knox County, Tennessee.

== Career ==
Mabry served in the 1834 Tennessee constitutional convention. He served two terms in the Tennessee House of Representatives, representing Knox County, from 1835 to 1837.

Mabry was a farmer and trader. He had a farm west of Knoxville. He was brigadier general of the Tennessee state militia.

== Personal life ==
Mabry married Alice and had five children, including Joseph Alexander Mabry II. His son Joseph was also a farmer and politician. His son and two grandsons Willie and Joseph Alexander Mabry III also died violent deaths.

== Death ==
On March 31, 1837, Mabry fired a pistol at Dr. William A. Leland in Tuscaloosa, Alabama. He was subsequently stabbed multiple times by Leland with a Bowie knife. He died weeks later on April 19 in Tuscaloosa.
