= Vicks =

American brand of over-the-counter medications

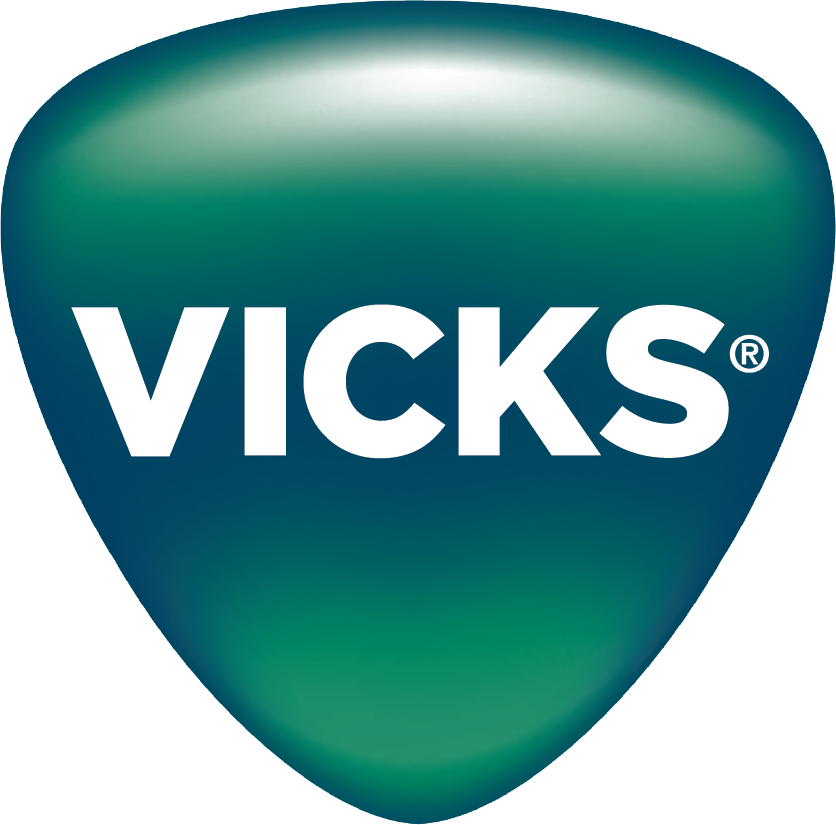
- Product type: Over-the-counter medicines
- Current owner: Procter & Gamble; Kaz Incorporated; (VapoSteam & VapoPads)
- Country: United States
- Introduced: 1898; 128 years ago
- Related brands: Wick
- Previous owners: Richardson-Vicks, Inc.
- Tagline: "Breathe Life In"
- Website: vicks.com
- Former names: Lunsford Richardson Wholesale Drug Company (1898–1905); Vick's Family Remedies (1905–1911); Vick Chemical Company (1911–1982)

Vicks (known in Latin America as Vick) is an American brand of over-the-counter medications owned by the American companies Procter & Gamble and Kaz Incorporated. Vicks manufactures NyQuil and its sister medication, DayQuil as well as other medications in the "Quil" line. Vicks also produces the Formula 44 brand of cough medicines, cough drops, Vicks VapoRub, and a number of inhaled breathing treatments. For much of its history, Vicks products were manufactured by the family-owned company Richardson-Vicks, Inc., based in Greensboro, North Carolina. Richardson-Vicks, Inc., was eventually sold to Procter & Gamble in 1985. Procter & Gamble divested the Vicks VapoSteam U.S. liquid inhalant business and sold it to Helen of Troy in 2015.

In German-speaking countries (except Switzerland), the brand Vicks is sold as Wick to avoid brand errors related to pronunciation. This was done to avoid obscene and potentially offensive connotation, as v pronounced natively in German is /f/ and it could be mispronounced as Fick(s) (meaning "Fuck(s)"), and Vicks is a homophone for "wichs", a conjugation of the German word "wichsen", meaning male masturbation.

== History ==
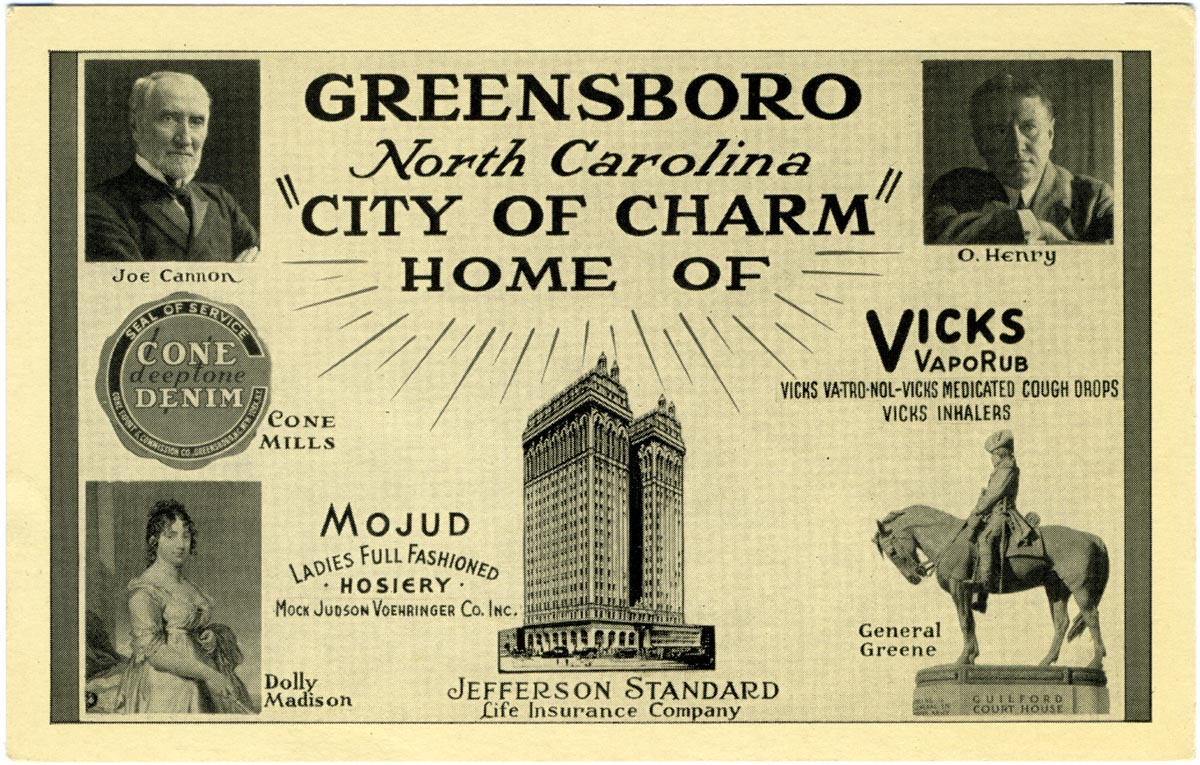
A North Carolina postcard featuring Vicks

In 1890, pharmacist Lunsford Richardson of Selma, North Carolina, took over the retail drug business of his brother-in-law Dr. John Vick, of Greensboro, North Carolina. After Dr. John Vick saw an ad for Vick's Seeds, Lunsford Richardson began marketing Vick’s Family Remedies. The basic ingredients of the range of products included castor oil, liniment, and 'dead shot' vermifuge. The most popular remedy was Croup and Pneumonia Salve, which was first compounded in 1891, in Greensboro. It was introduced in 1905 with the name Vick's Magic Croup Salve and rebranded as VapoRub in 1912 at the instigation of H. Smith Richardson, Lunsford's oldest son, who had gained valuable sales and marketing experience while working for a period in New York and Massachusetts after attending college. Smith Richardson assumed the presidency of the company in 1919 upon his father's death.

Lunsford Richardson sent out millions of samples of Vicks VapoRub, "inadvertently" inventing the concept of junk mail, say North Carolina state historians. The flu epidemic of 1918 increased sales of VapoRub from $900,000 to $2.9 million in just one year. In 1931, the company began selling cough drops. The Vicks VapoInhaler, a portable nasal inhaler providing mentholated vapor relief, was introduced in 1941, and became colloquially known as the Vick Stick.In 1948, Edward Mabry became president of Vicks, then known as the Vick Chemical Company. In 1952, Vicks began selling cough syrup, and in 1959 they introduced Sinex Nasal Spray. The company began selling NyQuil in 1966. The parent company became Richardson-Merrell and then in 1982 divided into prescription drug company Merrell Dow (sold to Dow Chemical Company) and over-the-counter drug company Richardson-Vicks which retained the Vicks brand.

The company archives (including related personal records of the Richardson family) from at least about 1920 or so, up to the 1985 sale to Procter & Gamble, are housed at the University of North Carolina at Chapel Hill.

In March 2015, Procter & Gamble sold the Vicks VapoSteam U.S. liquid inhalant business to Helen of Troy Ltd.
