= Mabry–Hazen House =

Historic house in Tennessee, United States

- Joseph Alexander Mabry Jr. House
- U.S. National Register of Historic Places
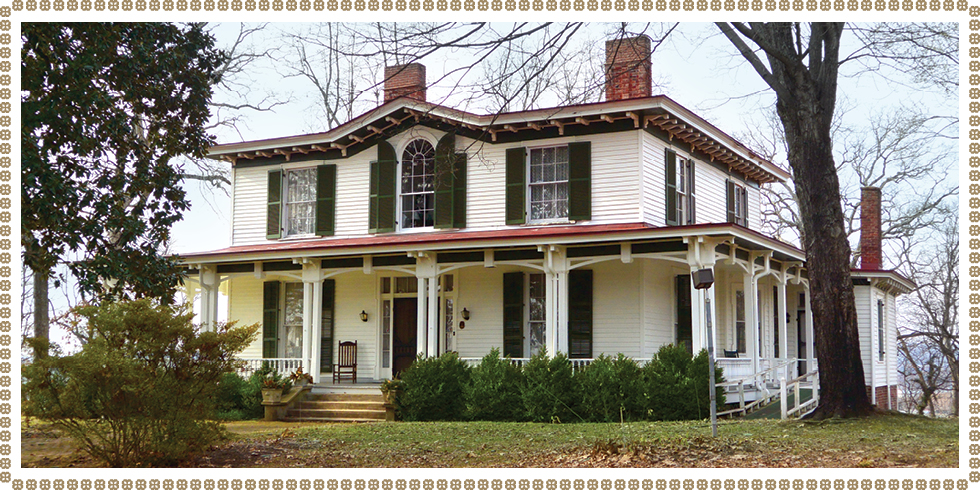

- Location within Tennessee Location within the United States
- Location: 1711 Dandridge Ave. Knoxville, Tennessee
- Coordinates: 35°58′16″N 83°54′11″W
- Built: 1858
- Architectural style: Italianate, Greek Revival
- NRHP reference No.: 89001974
- Added to NRHP: November 13, 1989

The Mabry–Hazen House is a historic home located on an 8-acre (3.2 ha) site at 1711 Dandridge Avenue in Knoxville, Tennessee, at the crest of Mabry's Hill. Also known as the Evelyn Hazen House or the Joseph Alexander Mabry Jr. House, when constructed in 1858 for Joseph Alexander Mabry II it was named Pine Hill Cottage. The house was in what was then the separate town of East Knoxville. Stylistically, the house exhibits both Italianate and Greek Revival elements. Additions in 1886 increased the size of the first floor. Having operated as a museum since the death of Evelyn Hazen, the house retains its original furniture and family collections, including antique china and crystal with over 2,000 original artifacts on display making it the largest original family collection within America. The house is listed on the National Register of Historic Places.

At the outset of the American Civil War, Joseph Mabry II, a wealthy Knoxville merchant and importer, pledged $100,000.00 to outfit an entire regiment of Confederate soldiers. Because of this assistance to the cause, he was given the honorary title of General in the Confederate army. During the course of the war, both Union and Confederate forces occupied the strategic site of his house adjacent to Fort Hill. Confederate General Felix Zollicoffer set up his headquarters in the house in 1861, but it was Union forces who had the greatest impact when they fortified the grounds as part of their Knoxville defenses after later taking control of Knoxville.

After Mabry's death in 1882, his daughter Alice Evelyn Mabry and her husband Rush Strong Hazen resided in the house. Their youngest daughter, Evelyn Hazen, later occupied the house alone (except for many pet dogs and cats) for many years until her death in 1987. Her will stipulated that the house had either to become a museum or be razed to the ground. The house opened as a museum in 1992.

== Cemetery ==
Knoxville's Confederate Cemetery, also known as Bethel Cemetery, located at 1917 Bethel Avenue, occupies 2.4 acres (0.97 ha) near the house, and is owned by the same museum foundation. It contains the graves of approximately 1,600 Confederate soldiers, 50–60 Union men (prisoners) and 20 veterans. The cemetery also contains a 48-foot (15 m) high monument erected in 1892, consisting of a Tennessee marble obelisk topped by a Confederate soldier facing north. The cemetery property includes a frame caretaker's house, built circa 1881, known as the Winstead Mansion.

== In literature ==
Three generations of the occupants of the Mabry–Hazen House have been referenced in literary works. In Life on the Mississippi, Mark Twain wrote about the gunfight that killed the home's builder Joseph Mabry II, and his son, Joseph III (known as Joseph Jr.). Mabry's daughter married Rush Strong Hazen, a benefactor to Leonora Whitaker Wood, whose life was fictionalized in the novel, Christy. In 2007, author Jane Van Ryan published The Seduction of Miss Evelyn Hazen, a book chronicling the sensational lawsuit between Knoxville socialite Evelyn Hazen, granddaughter of General Mabry, and Ralph Scharringhaus, to whom she was once engaged.
