= Chest rub =

Topical treatment for discomfort applied to chest

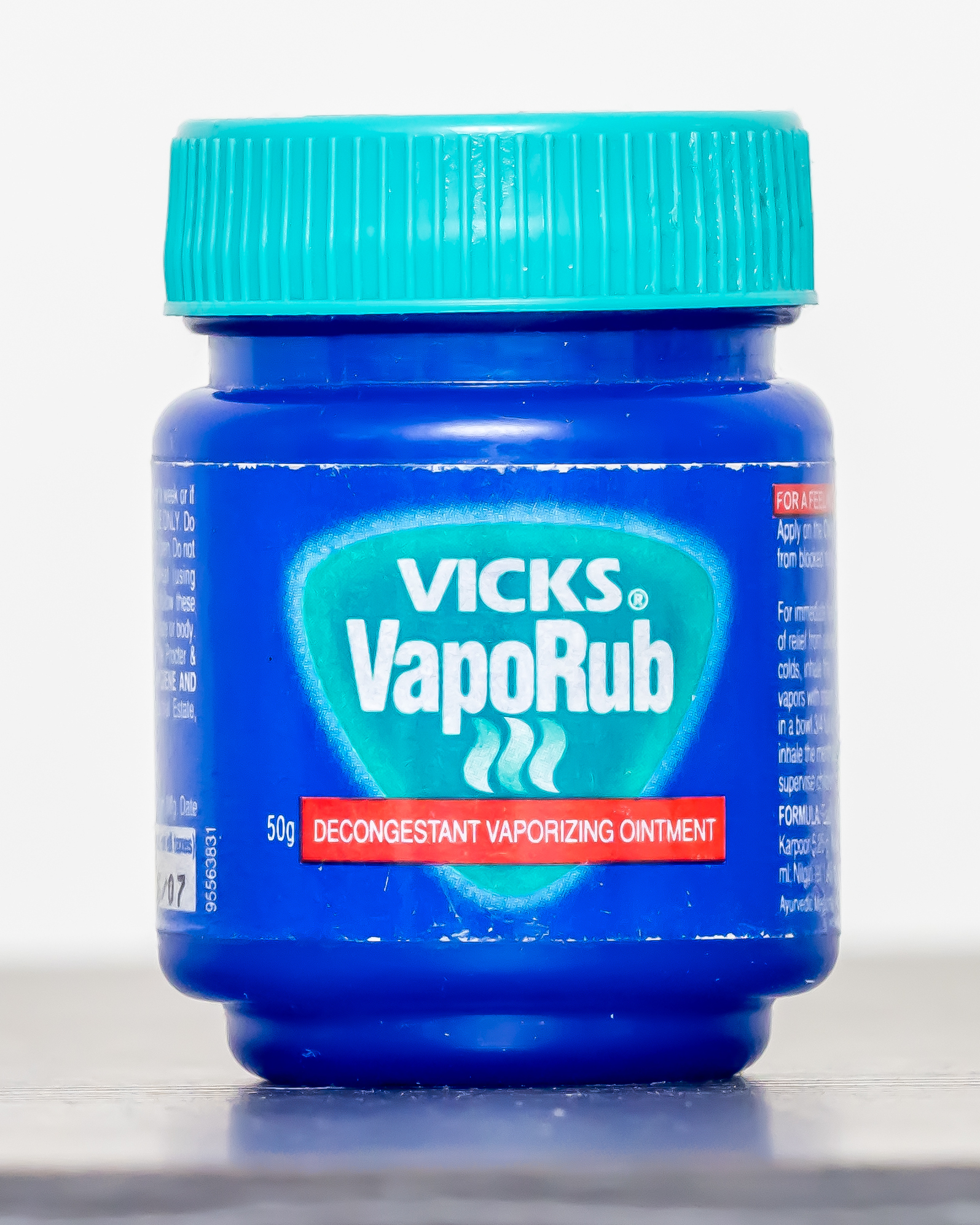
Vicks VapoRub is a prominent example of a chest rub

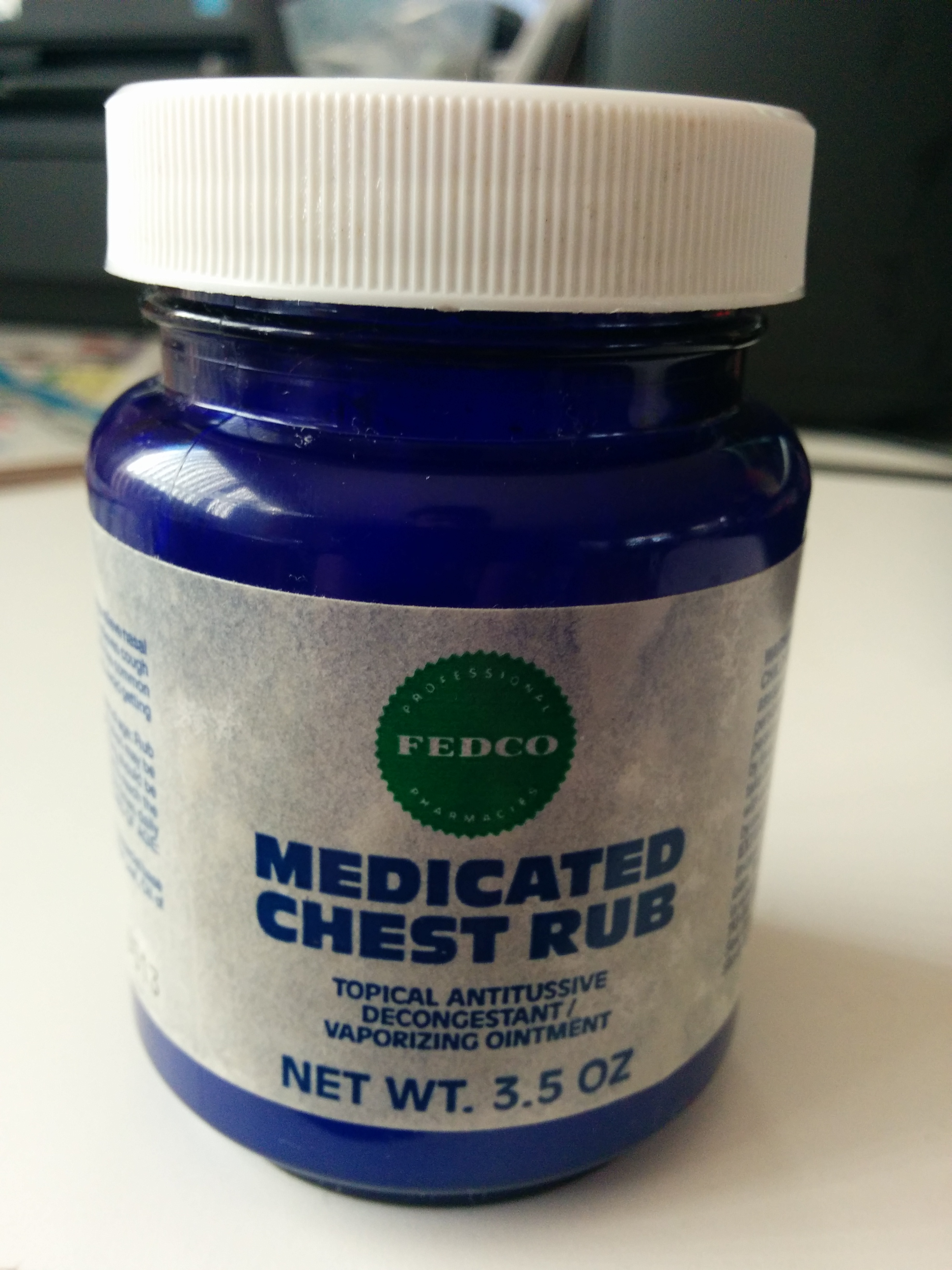

Chest rub or cold rub is an aromatic topical medication applied to the chest, which is intended to assist with minor medical conditions that temporarily impair breathing, such as cough and colds. Such medications are available over-the-counter in many countries. Vicks VapoRub is perhaps the most well known example.

== Application ==
In addition to the chest it may also be applied to the neck or back, usually immediately before sleeping. Alternatively, it may be added to hot water and the vapours inhaled. There have been reports of accidental burn injuries or scalding in children by these steam-vapour treatments, when containers of boiling water have been accidentally spilled, and most producers therefore advise against it.

== Ingredients ==
Chest rubs typically consist of a petroleum jelly-based ointment. Menthol is the most common active ingredient, but camphor and eucalyptus oil may also be present. Various fragrance compounds may be added, which are usually complementary with the strong mint-licorice odour of the menthol. Examples include: coumarin, thymol (thyme oil), limonene, cedarleaf oil, nutmeg oil and Lavender oil.

== Effectiveness ==
A single study of vapor rub found that it improved cough and cold symptoms more than a control in children with the common cold. Side effects included mild irritation of the skin where it was applied. The study was funded by Procter & Gamble, the owner of Vicks. Football players apply Vicks VapoRub on their chest to improve respiratory function.

== See also ==
- Tiger Balm
