= Joseph Alexander Mabry II =

American businessman (1826–1882)

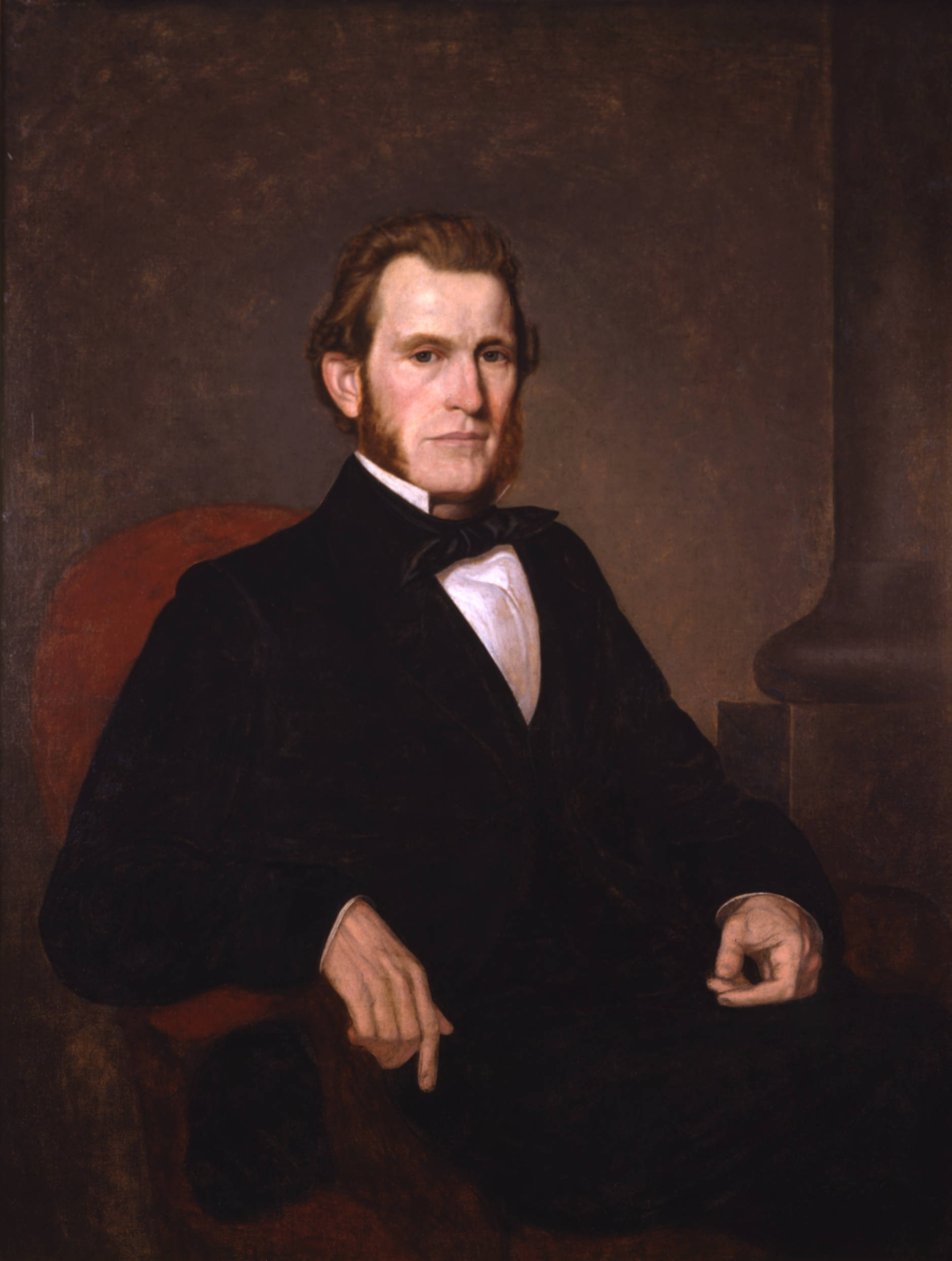
- Born: January 26, 1826; Knox County, Tennessee, U.S.
- Died: October 19, 1882 (aged 56); Knoxville, Tennessee, U.S.
- Cause of death: Gunshot wounds
- Occupations: Land and railroad speculator, stock breeder
- Spouse: Laura Evelyn Churchwell
- Father: Joseph Alexander Mabry

Joseph Alexander Mabry II (January 26, 1826 – October 19, 1882) was an American folk figure and businessman active primarily in Knoxville, Tennessee, in the mid-nineteenth century. Mabry earned a fortune through land and railroad speculation during the 1850s, and was known throughout the South for his herd of race horses. During the Civil War, Mabry donated a large supply of uniforms and tents to the Confederate Army, and was rewarded with the rank of general. For the remainder of his life, he was thus often referred to by the sobriquet, "General Mabry."

In his day, Mabry was one of Knoxville's most influential citizens. In 1853, Mabry and his brother-in-law, William G. Swan, donated the initial acreage for the city's Market Square. As president of the Knoxville and Kentucky Railroad, Mabry raised millions of dollars in funding for railroad construction in the region. After the Civil War, Mabry quickly made amends with the city's pro-Union businessmen, and continued to champion railroad development. By the 1870s, however, his business ventures had mostly failed, leaving him heavily in debt. In 1882, Mabry and his son were killed in a shootout with banker Thomas O'Connor in downtown Knoxville, an incident later chronicled by Mark Twain in his book, Life on the Mississippi.

The Mabry–Hazen House, built by Mabry in 1858, still stands in Knoxville.

== Biography ==
=== Early life ===
Mabry was born near modern Concord in west Knox County, Tennessee, to state legislator and farmer Joseph Alexander Mabry and Alice Hare Scott. In 1837, the elder Mabry was killed in a duel in Tuscaloosa, Alabama, leaving Mabry to be raised by his older brother, George (builder of the Mabry-Hood House). After completing school in Knox County, Mabry is believed to have attended the Holston Seminary (in New Market), and possibly Tusculum College, although the latter has no record of his attendance.

=== Pre-Civil War businesses ===
In the early 1850s, Mabry formed a landholding company that speculated in land on the periphery of Knoxville. In 1853, Mabry and his brother-in-law, attorney William G. Swan, donated what is now Market Square (then empty pastureland just north of the city limits) to the city for the establishment of a market house, where regional farmers could sell produce. During the same period, Mabry used his connections in the Tennessee state legislature to obtain funding for railroad construction, acquiring over the years millions of dollars in bonds for the Knoxville and Kentucky Railroad (by the time the railroad was placed in receivership in 1869, it had been loaned over $2.3 million by the state). Mabry was named president of this railroad in 1858, and had begun building the first stretch of this line to Clinton when the Civil War halted construction.

Mabry raised prized racehorses that competed in races across the South, and in 1860 he listed his occupation as "stock raiser." In 1858, Mabry built what is now known as the Mabry-Hazen House on a hill in East Knoxville, where he lived for the rest of his life. Mabry also served as a trustee for East Tennessee University (now the University of Tennessee).

=== Civil War ===
By the early 1860s, Mabry was one of Knoxville's largest slaveholders, and like most Democrats, he generally supported secession. During the secession crisis that followed Abraham Lincoln's election in November 1860, Mabry waffled between angrily calling for "immediate secession," and seeking a peaceful resolution to the crisis. In April 1861, Mabry chased away a Confederate brass band attempting to interrupt a speech by pro-Unionist Andrew Johnson. The following day, however, Union supporter Charles Douglas was shot by a Confederate soldier on Gay Street in an incident for which Mabry was later charged as an accessory.

In December 1861, William "Parson" Brownlow, the vitriolic pro-Union editor of the Knoxville Whig, was jailed by Confederate authorities on charges of treason. While most of Knoxville's secessionists celebrated the arrest and called for Brownlow to be hanged, Mabry nevertheless lobbied on Brownlow's behalf, and managed to secure his release. Brownlow never forgot this gesture, and during the Reconstruction period following the war, Mabry was one of the few ex-Confederates spared the wrath of Brownlow's regime.

During the war, Mabry established a supply depot that provided uniforms and tents to Confederate soldiers. He later claimed to have donated $100,000 (~$1.99 million in 2024) to the Confederate cause, although historians point out that he may have earned upwards of one million dollars in contracts with Confederate purchasing agents during the course of the war. Furthermore, when the Union Army occupied Knoxville in September 1863, Mabry quickly switched sides, and offered his assistance to the occupying forces. He took the United States Oath of Allegiance on January 29, 1864.

=== Post-war activities ===
After the war, Mabry continued championing railroad construction. Working with fellow Confederate-turned-Unionist Charles McClung McGhee, Mabry helped extend the Knoxville and Kentucky Railroad to modern Caryville, providing invaluable railroad access to the lucrative coalfields of western Anderson County. By 1869, however, the railroad was bankrupt and placed in receivership. Mabry's fortunes began to decline, and in subsequent years he fell deeply into debt.

Throughout the 1860s, Mabry consistently quarrelled with Knoxville attorney John Baxter, who accused Mabry of opportunism and profiteering during the war. In 1869, after the Knoxville and Kentucky was placed in receivership, Baxter sued Mabry, claiming that Mabry had practically pillaged the company. The two assailed one another in the press, and filed libel suits and counter libel suits against one another. Finally, on June 13, 1870, Mabry approached Baxter in front of the Lamar House Hotel, stated, "Business is business," and shot Baxter in the wrist. Baxter managed to run away, and for reasons unknown, never pressed charges.

=== Mabry–O'Connor shootout ===
In December 1881, Mabry's son, Will, was shot and killed by Constable Don Lusby during a barroom brawl at Snodderly's bar on Gay Street. Lusby was arrested for murder, but acquitted of the charge in April 1882, leaving the Mabry family outraged. For several weeks, Mabry and Lusby exchanged threats. In August 1882, a chaotic brawl erupted at the Knox County Courthouse involving Mabry, his son Joseph Mabry III, Lusby, Lusby's father, and several others. During the fracas, Lusby and his father were shot and killed. Mabry and his son were charged with the murder of the Lusbys, but were acquitted.

In 1880, Mabry sold a parcel of land to Mechanics' National Bank president Thomas O'Connor under the stipulation that O'Connor give the land to Mabry's son, Will. After Will's death, the land became O'Connor's, leading Mabry to suspect that O'Connor had somehow arranged for Will to be murdered. On October 17, 1882, a visibly intoxicated Mabry confronted O'Connor at the Fair Grounds in South Knoxville, but O'Connor backed off, saying it was neither the time nor place to settle their dispute. That evening, Mabry sent O'Connor a message, stating he would "kill him on sight."

On the morning of October 19, 1882, O'Connor stepped outside the Mechanics' Bank and spotted Mabry walking down Gay Street. O'Connor quickly grabbed a double-barreled shotgun, and emptied both barrels into Mabry, killing him instantly. Hearing the commotion, Joseph Mabry III, hurried toward the bank, and upon seeing his father's body, drew a pistol and shot O'Connor. As O'Connor fell mortally wounded, he managed to fire one final shot, killing the younger Mabry. Along with these three deaths, seven bystanders were wounded by stray shot from O'Connor's gun.

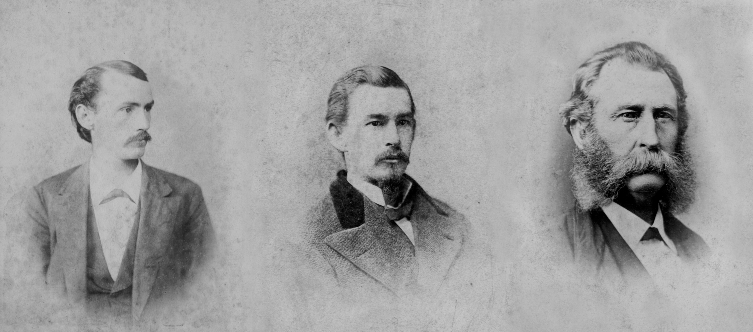
Willie Mabry, Joseph Alexander Mabry III, and Joseph Alexander Mabry II

== Legacy ==
Mabry and his son, the latter representing the third consecutive generation of the family killed in a gunfight, were buried next to Will Mabry in Old Gray Cemetery after a funeral at the Mabry-Hazen House on October 20, 1882. O'Connor was buried in the same cemetery the following day. Chapter 40 of Mark Twain's 1883 book, Life on the Mississippi, references an account of the Mabry-O'Connor shootout.

Mabry's granddaughter, Evelyn Hazen, eventually inherited the Mabry-Hazen House, and lived there until her death in 1987. The house has since been transformed into a historic house museum.

During the 1960s, Mabry's descendants sued the City of Knoxville over the demolition of the Market House on Market Square, which the city replaced with the Market Mall. The family argued this action violated the 1853 Mabry-Swan deed, which stipulated the land must be used for a Market House for farmers, or its ownership would revert to Mabry and Swan, or their heirs.
