= Vicks VapoRub =

Mentholated topical ointment

VapoRub
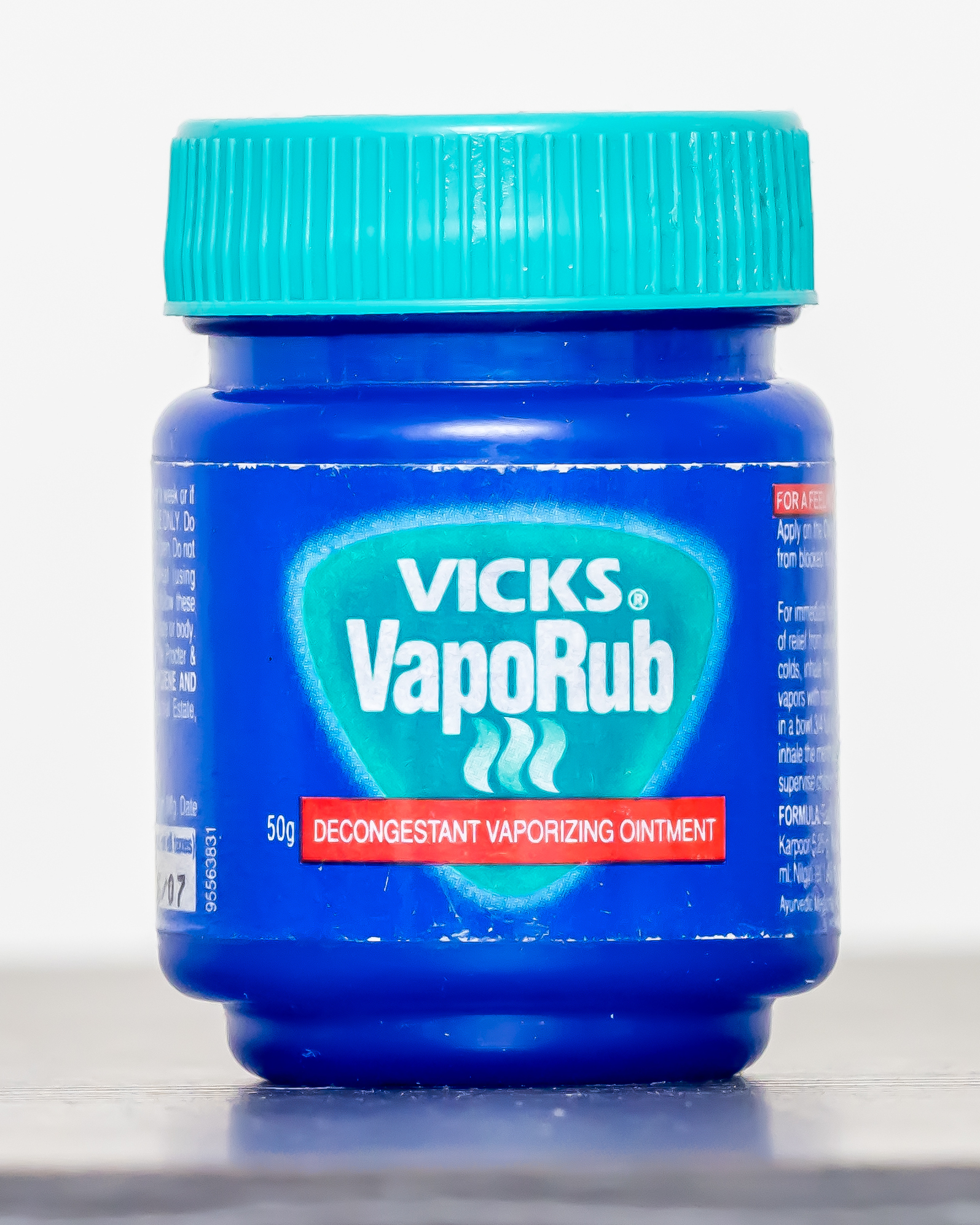
- Type: Ointment
- Inventor: Lunsford Richardson
- Inception: 1905
- Manufacturer: Vicks
- Available: Available
- Website: vicks.com/en-us/shop-products/vaporub

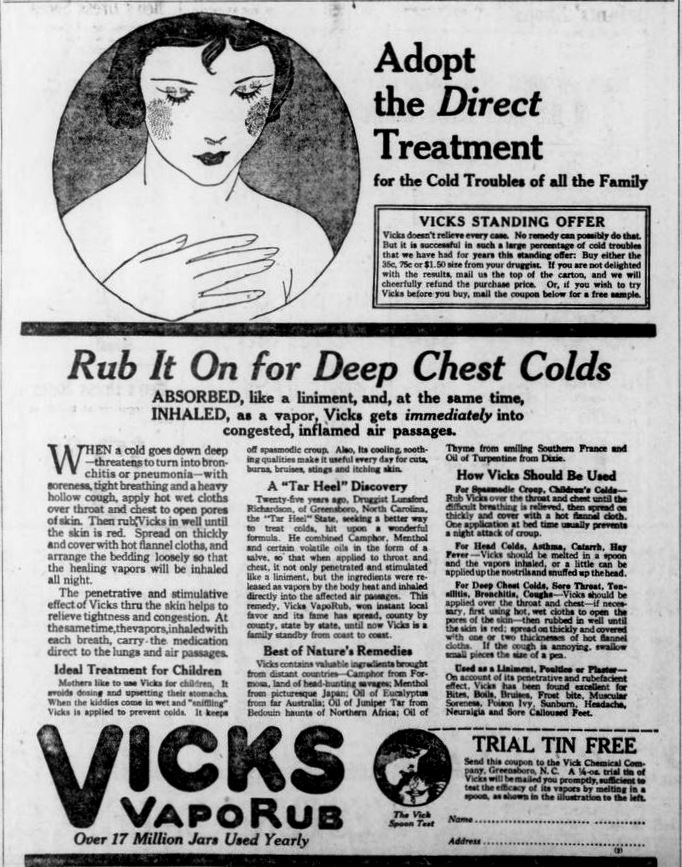
Vicks VapoRub ad, 1922

Vicks VapoRub (or VapoRub) is a mentholated topical ointment, part of the Vicks brand of over-the-counter medications owned by the American consumer goods company Procter & Gamble. VapoRub is intended for use on the chest, back and throat for cough suppression or on muscles and joints for minor aches and pains. Users of VapoRub often apply it immediately before sleep.

First sold in 1905, VapoRub was originally manufactured by family-owned company Richardson-Vicks, Inc., based in Greensboro, North Carolina. Richardson-Vicks was sold to Procter & Gamble in 1985 and is now known as Vicks. VapoRub is also manufactured and packaged in India and Mexico. In German-speaking countries (apart from Switzerland), it is sold under the name Wick VapoRub to avoid brand blundering, as the German-language pronunciation of the written name "Vick(s)" would be homophonous with a German word usually considered profane. VapoRub continues to be Vicks's flagship product internationally, and the Vicks brand name is often used synonymously with the VapoRub product.

== History ==
The product can be traced to Jules Bengué, a French pharmacist, who created Ben-Gay, a menthol-based treatment for arthritis, gout and neuralgia. Lunsford Richardson, a pharmacist in Selma, North Carolina, sold Ben-Gay and heard from his customers that it cleared their sinuses. Richardson formulated Vicks to cure his son’s croup. He blended menthol into petroleum jelly, at first calling it Richardson's Croup and Pneumonia Cure Salve, later changing the name to Vicks VapoRub. It was named after Richardson's brother-in-law, Joshua Vick, a physician who had arranged for Richardson to have access to a laboratory to create the product. Richardson began selling it in 1905, renaming it VapoRub in 1912. In 2019, Vicks re-introduced VapoCream, a cream version of VapoRub - which was previously discontinued in the early 2000s.

== Usage ==
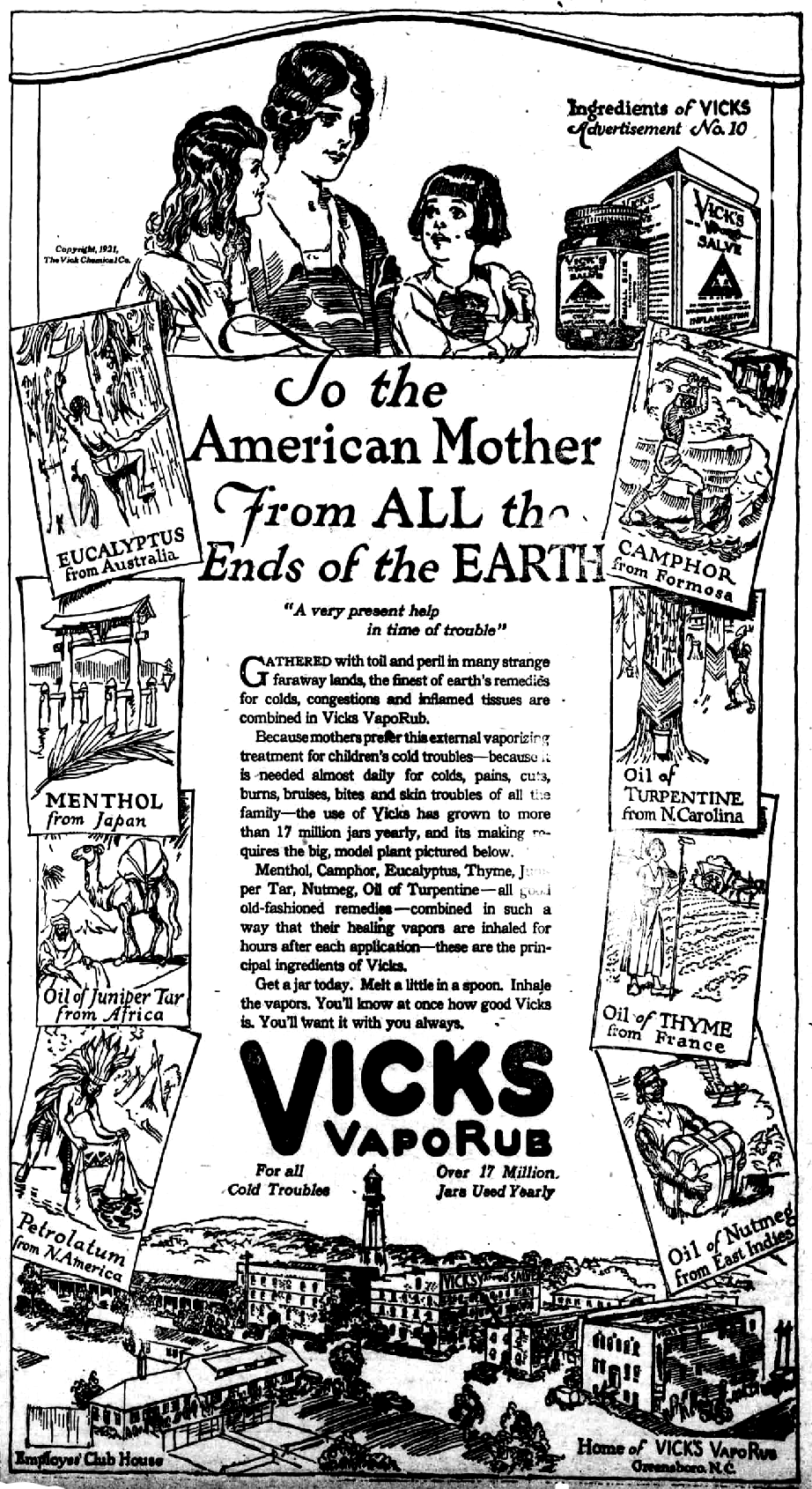
Vaporub ad from 1922, showing the international ingredients and the factory

While VapoRub has in the past been marketed for hot steam inhalation, this can potentially present a risk of burns due to splattering or fire, and should never be heated or added to hot water. VapoRub is labeled only for external use, with care to avoid eyes, nostrils and mouth. Application directly under the nose is not generally recommended as both camphor and petroleum can cause health problems if absorbed.

In pre-clinical animal studies, the application of Vicks VapoRub directly onto the tracheae of ferrets caused an increase in mucus production compared to a water-based lubricant. One of these studies suggested that because the ingredients of Vicks VapoRub can be irritants, it may also stimulate mucus production and airway inflammation in humans, leading to respiratory distress in infants and young children due to the small size of their airways.

A Penn State study showed Vicks VapoRub to be more effective than placebo petroleum rub for helping cough and congestion with regard to helping children and adults sleep. However, the study also showed that, unlike with the petroleum rub placebo, Vicks VapoRub was associated with burning sensations to the skin (28%), nose (14%) and eyes (16%), with 5% of study participants reporting redness and rash when using the product. The study's first author is a paid consultant for Procter & Gamble, maker of VapoRub.

A study conducted in 1994 suggests menthol and camphor are effective cough suppressants for guinea pigs. It has been suggested that thymol oil can reduce or cure onychomycosis (nail fungus), although the same source mentions that "no human studies have been conducted to test whether thymol is a lasting and effective treatment". Football players apply it on their chest to improve respiratory function.

== Ingredients ==
The ingredients, as listed on older product labels, are: camphor, menthol, spirits of turpentine, oil of eucalyptus, cedarwood, nutmeg, and thymol, all "in a specially balanced Vick formula".

=== United States ===
Active ingredients: Label reads: Active Ingredients (Purpose)

Regular:

| Ingredient | % | Purpose |
|---|---|---|
| Camphor (synthetic) | 4.8% | Cough suppressant and topical analgesic |
| Eucalyptus oil | 1.2% | Cough suppressant |
| Menthol | 2.6% | Cough suppressant and topical analgesic |

Lemon:

| Ingredient | % | Purpose |
|---|---|---|
| Camphor (synthetic) | 4.7% | Cough suppressant and topical analgesic |
| Eucalyptus oil | 1.2% | Cough suppressant |
| Menthol | 2.6% | Cough suppressant and topical analgesic |

Inactive ingredients

Regular & Lemon:

- cedarleaf oil
- nutmeg oil
- petrolatum
- thymol
- turpentine oil

Lemon:

- lemon fragrance

=== India ===
In India, Vicks VapoRub is made by Procter & Gamble (P&G). The formulation is almost the same as the one stated above. P&G claims Vicks Vaporub to be an Ayurvedic medicine, as indicated on the package. The ingredients (per 100 g of product) are stated as follows:

| Ingredient | English | Amount |
|---|---|---|
| Pudinah ke phool | Menthol | 2.82 g |
| Karpoor | Camphor | 5.25 g |
| Ajowan ke phool | Thymol | 0.10 g |
| Tarpin ka tel | Turpentine oil | 5.57 ml |
| Nilgiri tel | Eucalyptol | 1.49 ml |
| Jatiphal tel | Nutmeg oil | 0.54 ml |
| Ointment base q.s. | | |

== See also ==
- Aromatherapy
- Chest rub
- Essential oil
- Levomethamphetamine (Vicks Inhaler)
- Mentholatum
- Tiger Balm
