= Milton Antiseptic =

Milton Antiseptic Ltd was an English company which made the household antiseptic solution. Registered as Milton Proprietary Ltd in 1923, the company changed its name to Milton Antiseptic Ltd. in May 1942. The company was wound up in 1960.

During World War II, the company benefited from an endorsement by a medical official broadcast in the United Kingdom in August 1940: during the talk Milton was named as a suitable hypochlorite antiseptic to sterilize water.

In 1958 the company merged with Richardson-Merrell, Inc. (formerly Vick Chemical Company).
