= Justice Mabry =

Justice Mabry may refer to:

- Milton H. Mabry (1851–1919), associate justice of the Florida Supreme Court
- Thomas J. Mabry (1884–1962), chief justice of the New Mexico Supreme Court
