= Lunsford Richardson =

American businessman (1854–1919)

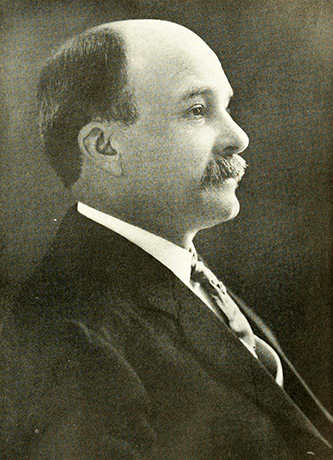
- Born: December 29, 1854; Selma, North Carolina, US
- Died: August 21, 1919 (aged 64)
- Resting place: Green Hill Cemetery, Greensboro, North Carolina
- Occupation: pharmacist
- Known for: Richardson Vicks Inc.
- Spouse: Mary Lynn Smith (m. 1884)

Signature
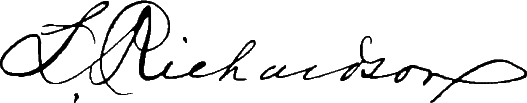

Lunsford Richardson (December 29, 1854 - August 21, 1919) was an American pharmacist from Selma, North Carolina, and the founder of Vick Chemical Company (which became Richardson Vicks Inc.).

== Early life ==
Lunsford Richardson was born in 1854 on a farm near Selma, North Carolina. He attended Horner and Graves School and Davidson College, where he graduated with highest honors in Latin in 1875. He taught at The Little River Academy before he became a pharmacist. He married Mary Lynn Smith, from Greensboro, North Carolina, in about 1884. They had two sons, H. Smith Richardson and Lunsford Richardson, and three daughters, Laurinda, Mary N. and Janet L.

Richardson bought a drugstore in Selma where he concocted and sold a menthol-laced ointment for "croupy" babies that he labeled "Vick's" in honor of Dr. Joshua W. Vick, his brother-in-law who helped him get established in business. Later he sold the store in Selma and bought one in Greensboro. (This was the Porter and Tate Drugstore – Dr. Porter was the uncle of William Sydney Porter, the author known as O. Henry.)

== Development of VapoRub ==
In 1890, he took over the retail drug business of his brother-in-law Dr. John Vick, of Greensboro, North Carolina. After Richardson saw an ad for Vick's Seeds, he wanted to use the name "Vick's" because it was short and easy to remember. Dr. Vick was happy for his name to be used. Richardson began marketing Vick's Family Remedies. The basic ingredients of the range included castor oil, liniment, and 'dead shot' vermifuge. The most popular remedy was Croup and Pneumonia Salve, which was first compounded in 1891, in Greensboro. Richardson formulated Vicks to cure his son’s croup. It was introduced in 1905 with the name Vick's Magic Croup Salve and rebranded as VapoRub in 1912 at the instigation of H. Smith Richardson, Lunsford's oldest son; Smith had gained valuable sales and marketing experience while working for a period in New York and Massachusetts after attending college. Smith Richardson assumed the presidency of the company in 1919 upon his father's death.

== Founding Vicks ==
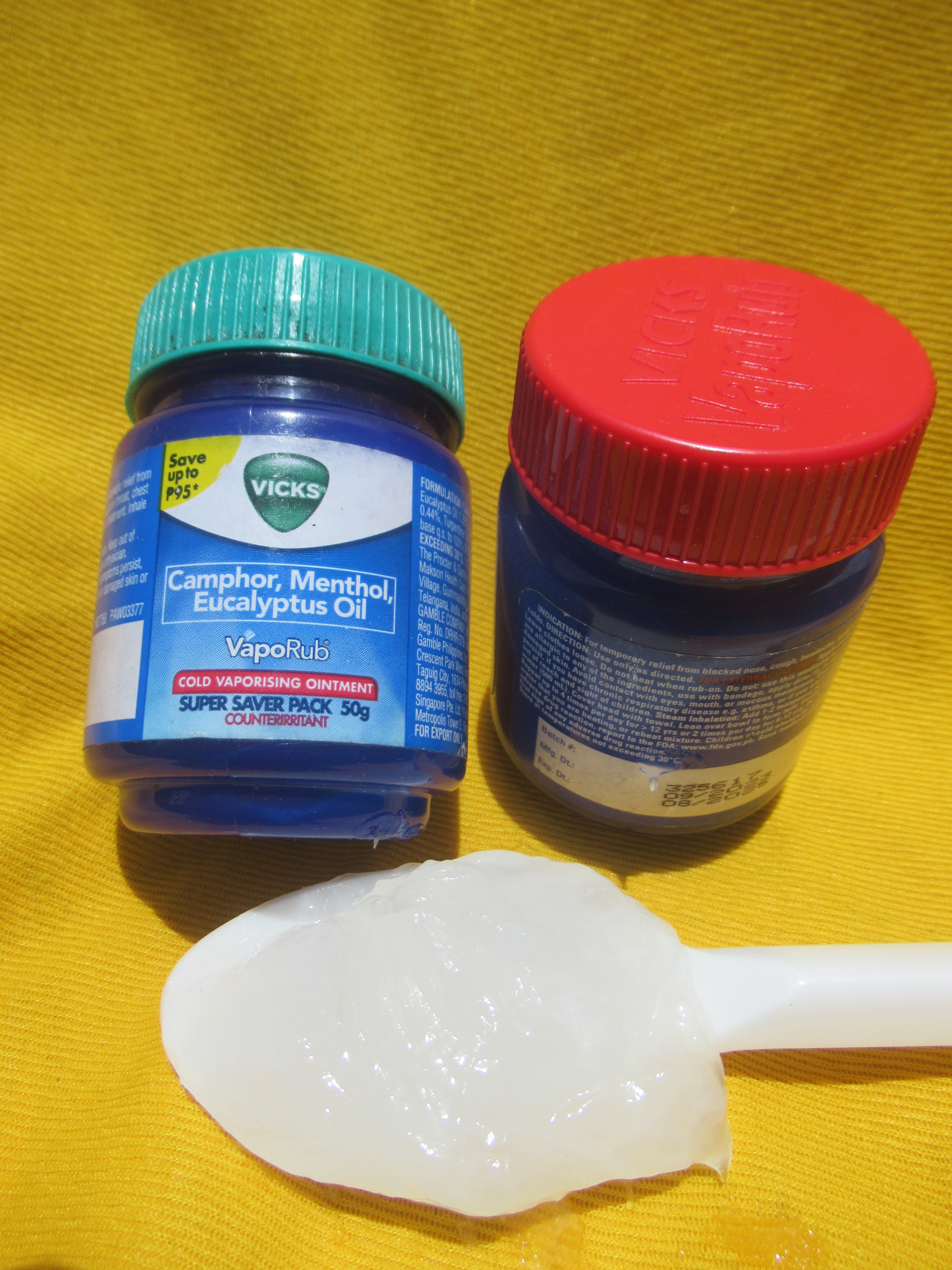
Vicks VapoRub

In 1898, he sold his drugstore and formed Lunsford Richardson Wholesale Drug company, one of only 4 wholesale drug companies in North Carolina. He sold the 21 Vicks products as well as other drugs. In 1905 he sold the wholesale drug company and founded Vicks Family Remedies Company, which became Richardson-Merrell Inc, and later Richardson Vicks Inc.

Initially, Vicks struggled to sell outside the Greensboro area until Lunsford's son, H. Smith, decided to concentrate only on the renamed VapoRub, the one unique and distinctive product of the 21.

Lunsford Richardson sent out millions of samples of Vicks VapoRub, "inadvertently" inventing the concept of junk mail, according to North Carolina state historians.

== Civic activities ==
Richardson was active in Church activities (as elder to First Presbyterian). An editorial in the Greensboro Daily News August 22, 1919 said, "he never passed anyone on the street, young or old, black or white, without a nod and a smile." He was particularly interested in the welfare of African-Americans. During World War II, a Liberty ship was christened SS Lunsford Richardson at "special request of the leading Negro citizens of North Carolina to honor the memory of a white friend." L. Richardson Memorial Hospital in Greensboro was renamed to honor him after receiving his donations for a modernization program, it originally served the black community.

== Death ==
Richardson became ill after a bout with pneumonia and died on August 21, 1919. He was buried at Green Hill Cemetery in Greensboro, North Carolina.

== Legacy ==
In April 2010, a North Carolina Highway Historical Marker in Richardon's honor was installed at Elm and Washington road junction in Greensboro.

== See also ==
- L. Richardson Preyer – Richardson's grandson, a U.S. Representative from North Carolina.
- Thalidomide – Richardson-Merrell Inc. attempted to market thalidomide in the U.S. and was denied by the U.S. Food and Drug Administration (FDA) for lack of safety studies.
