= Deciduous (disambiguation) =

The term deciduous refers to a biological process of losing or dropping appendages of the organism.

Specifically, the term may refer to:

- deciduous trees, plants which shed their leaves regularly
- deciduous teeth (milk teeth, baby teeth), that fall out during the course of normal development
- other body parts that are shed, such as antlers, are also described as deciduous
- Decidua
