= Decidualization =

Physiological process in the endometrium

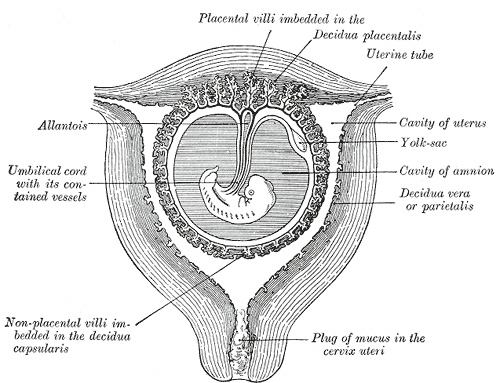
- Sectional plan of the gravid uterus in the third and fourth month.

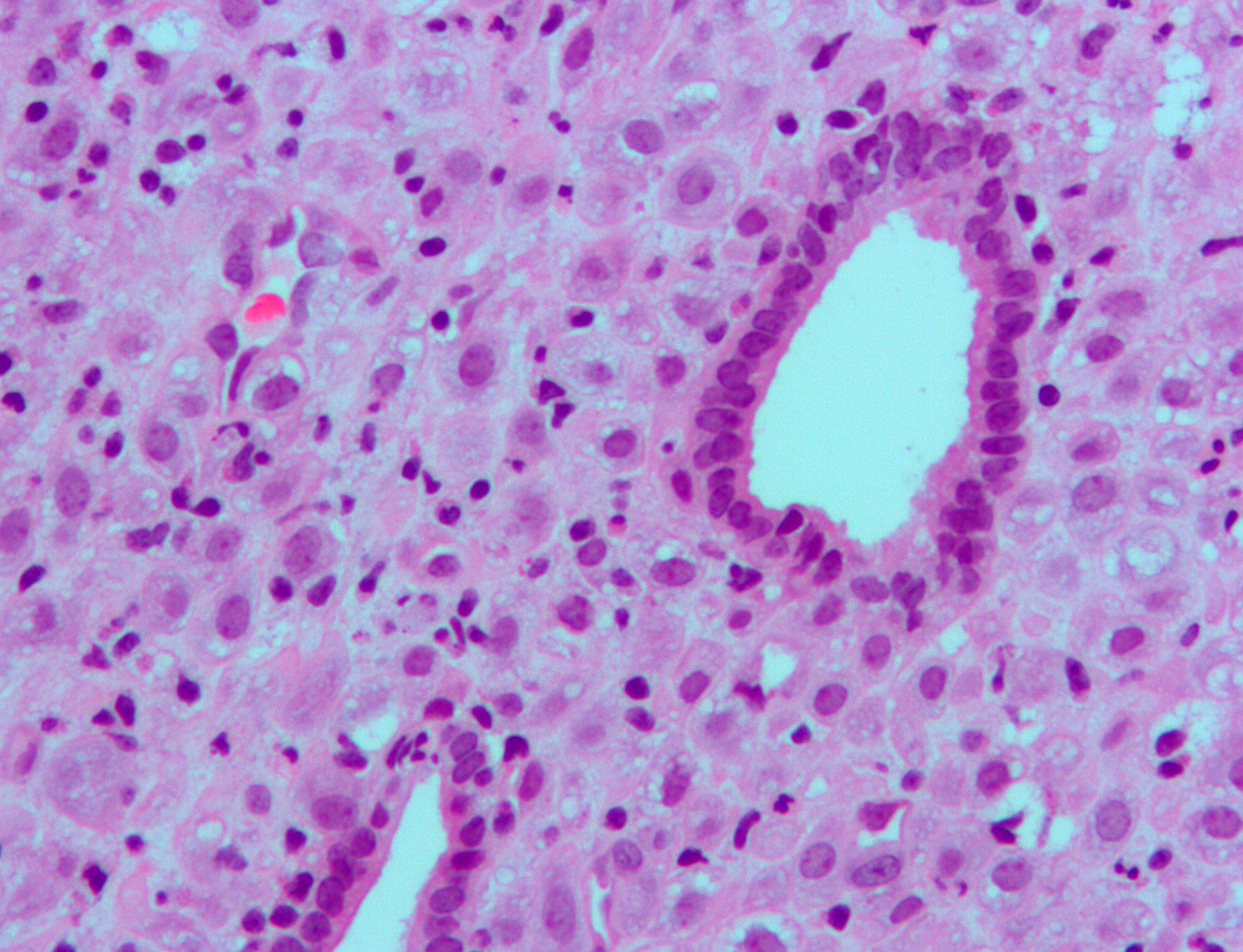
Micrograph showing decidualization of the endometrium due to exogenous progesterone (oral contraceptive pill). H&E stain.

Decidualization is a process that results in significant changes to cells of the endometrium in preparation for, and during, pregnancy. This includes morphological and functional changes (the decidual reaction) to endometrial stromal cells, the presence of decidual white blood cells (leukocytes), and vascular changes to maternal arteries. The sum of these changes results in the endometrium changing into a structure called the decidua. In humans, the decidua is shed during childbirth.

Decidualization plays an important role in promoting placenta formation between a mother and her fetus by mediating the invasiveness of trophoblast cells. It also triggers the production of cellular and molecular factors that result in structural changes, or remodeling, of maternal spiral arteries. Decidualization is required in some mammalian species where embryo implantation and trophoblast cell invasion of the endometrium occurs, also known as hemochorial placentation. This allows maternal blood to come into direct contact with the fetal chorion, a membrane between the fetal and maternal tissues, and allows for nutrient and gas exchange. However, decidualization-like reactions have also been observed in some species that don't display hemochorial placentation.

In humans, decidualization occurs after ovulation during the menstrual cycle. After implantation of the embryo, the decidua further develops to mediate the process of placentation. In the event that no embryo is implanted, the decidualized endometrial lining is shed. In menstruating mammals, decidualization is spontaneous and occurs as a result of maternal hormones. In non-menstruating species, decidualization is non-spontaneous, meaning it only happens after there are external signals from an implanted embryo.

== Overview ==
After ovulation, the high levels of progesterone initiate the molecular changes leading to decidualization. The process triggers an influx of decidual leukocytes along with morphological and functional changes of endometrial stromal cells (ESCs). The changes in the ESCs result in the endometrium developing a secretory lining that produces a variety of proteins, cytokines, and growth factors. These secreted factors will regulate the invasiveness of trophoblast cells that eventually form the placental connection if an embryo implants into the decidua.

=== Decidual leukocytes ===
One of the identifying features of the decidua is the presence of large numbers of leukocytes that are mostly made up of specialized uterine natural killer (uNK) cells and some dendritic cells. As the fetus consists of both maternal and paternal DNA, the decidual leukocytes play a role in suppressing the immune response of the mother to prevent treating the fetus as genetically foreign. Outside of their immune functions, the uNK cells and dendritic cells also act as regulators of maternal spiral artery remodeling and ESC differentiation.

=== Endometrial stromal cells ===
Endometrial stromal cells are the connective tissue cells of the endometrium that are fibroblastic in appearance. However, decidualization causes them to swell up and adopt an epithelial cell-like appearance due to the accumulation of glycogen and lipid droplets. Furthermore, they begin secreting cytokines, growth factors, and proteins like IGFBP1 and prolactin, along with extracellular matrix (ECM) proteins such as fibronectin and laminin. The increased production of these ECM proteins turns the endometrium into the dense structure known as the decidua, which produces factors that promote trophoblast attachment and inhibit overly aggressive invasion.

== During pregnancy ==
The decidual reaction is seen in very early pregnancy in the generalized area where the blastocyst contacts the endometrial decidua. It consists of an increase in secretory functions of the endometrium at the area of implantation, as well as a surrounding stroma that becomes edematous.

The decidual reaction occurs only in humans and a few other species. The decidual reaction and decidua are not required for implantation. Evidence can be taken from the fact that in ectopic pregnancies and hysterectomies, implantation can occur anywhere in the abdomino-pelvic cavity.

== Role in diseases and disorders ==
Abnormalities in decidualization have been implicated in diseases such as endometriosis, in which impaired decidualization leads to ectopic uterine tissue growth. Lack of decidualization has also been linked to higher rates of miscarriage.

Chronic deciduitis, a chronic inflammation of the decidua, has been linked with premature birth.

== In research ==
The decidualization process is initiated by progesterone, but this requires cyclic adenosine monophosphate (cAMP) to act as the initial signalling molecule to sensitize endometrial cells to progesterone. Consequently, human ESCs have been decidualized in culture with chemical analogs of cAMP and progesterone together. In vitro decidualization results in similar morphological changes to the human ESCs as well as upregulated production of decidualization markers such as IGFBP1 and prolactin.

Mouse models have been extensively used for the identification of the molecular factors required for and involved in decidualization.

== See also ==
- Decidua
- Decidual cells
