= Raissa Nitabuch =

Russian pathologist

- Born: 1862
- Education: University of Zurich; Institute of Anatomy in Bern
- Occupation: Physician

Raissa Nitabuch (Mintz-Nitabuch, Russian: Раиса (Рахиль) Семёновна Нитабух; born 1862) was a Russian pathologist who is known for her histological studies of the human placenta. The layer of fibrin that was thought to separate the uterine decidua from the fetoplacental trophoblast after birth was named the Nitabuch layer or Nitabuch membrane, thus becoming the only woman whose name is "affiliated with a macroscopic anatomical structure."

She was also the first to describe the spiral arteries which connect the uterine and placental blood flow during pregnancy, providing the developing fetus with oxygen and nutrients.

Part of a group of Russian women who studied medicine at the University of Zurich, she then completed her doctoral thesis in 1887 at the Institute of Anatomy in Bern under the supervision of pathologist Theodor Langhans. Her identification of the spiral arteries challenged the predominant scientific consensus of the day, which held that there was no interconnection between the uterine circulation and the intervillous space.
