= Decidual cells =

Specialized uterine tissue

Before the fertilized ovum reaches the uterus, the mucous membrane of the body of the uterus undergoes important changes and is then known as the decidua. The thickness and vascularity of the mucous membrane are greatly increased; its glands are elongated and open on its free surface by funnel-shaped orifices, while their deeper portions are tortuous and dilated into irregular spaces. The interglandular tissue is also increased in quantity, and is crowded with large round, oval, or polygonal cells, termed decidual cells. Their enlargement is due to glycogen and lipid accumulation in the cytoplasm allowing these cells to provide a rich source of nutrition for the developing embryo. Decidual cells are also thought to control the invasion of the endometrium by trophoblast cells.

Experimentally, human endometrial stromal cells can be decidualized in culture by using analogs of cAMP and progesterone. The cells will exhibit a decidualized phenotype and display upregulation of common decidualization markers such as prolactin and IGFBP1.

== Ectopic decidua ==
Ectopic decidua are decidual cells found outside inner lining of the uterus. This condition was first described in 1971 by Walker and the name 'ectopic decidua' was coined by Tausig. While ectopic decidua is most commonly seen during pregnancy, it rarely occurs in non-pregnant women, accompanied by bleeding and pain.

Generally, ectopic decidua has no clinical symptoms, but it sometimes manifests as abdominal pain in pregnancy. Ectopic decidua most commonly occurs the ovary, cervix and serosal lining of the uterus. It rarely occurs in peritoneum also. In the peritoneum, ectopic decidua is formed due to metaplasia of subserosal stromal cells under the influence of progesterone. It regresses within 4–6 weeks after childbirth. Therefore, no treatment is needed for this condition. However, it is necessary to differentiate deciduosis from metastatic cancers and mesothelioma.
