= Uterine natural killer cells =

Maternal lymphocytes that make up 70% of the total found during pregnancy

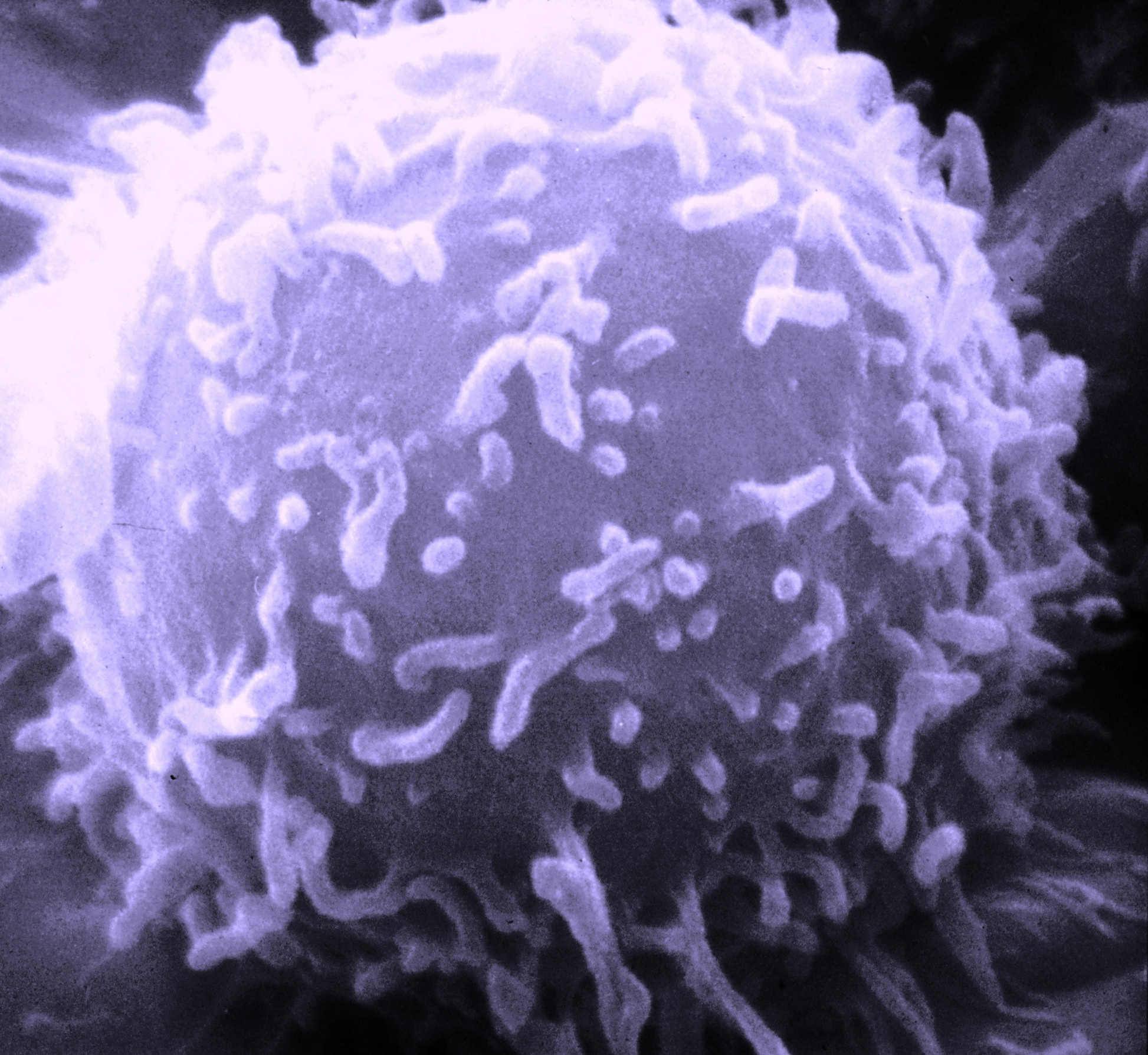
SEM Lymphocyte (uNK cells during pregnancy comprise 70% of lymphocytes)

Uterine natural killer cells make up approximately 70% of maternal lymphocytes during pregnancy, occupying both the decidua basalis of the endometrium at the implantation site and the mesometrial lymphoid aggregate of pregnancy (MLAp) that surrounds the blood vessels supplying the placenta. This number is at its peak in early pregnancy but declines at parturition.

== Morphology ==
=== General ===
Most studies of uterine natural killer cells use murine cells to model the human equivalent: unless stated otherwise, this section focuses on murine uterine natural killer cells. Uterine natural killer cells are large, granular, rounded or oval lymphocytes. On microscopic examination, they may have one or more cytoplasmic projections and/or be binucleate. Characteristically they contain eosinophilic granules that stain darkly with PAS, indicating the presence of glycoproteins. These granules usually appear regular (but some can be irregularly shaped), and they grow in size and number until approximately 2 weeks of gestation. Granules differ between species, with rat uterine natural killer cells displaying an increased number of small granules than murine cells. Rat uterine natural killer cell morphology also differs from the mouse due to the common occurrence of myelin within the granules. In all species, as active cells, they have numerous prominent organelles including mitochondria, well-developed golgi apparatus, free ribosomes and rough endoplasmic reticulum.

=== Receptors and surface proteins ===
Human uterine natural killer cells share many of the surface receptors and proteins of circulating natural killer cells, exhibiting high levels of CD94 and CD56. However, they possess a unique expression profile of certain proteins, specifically CD9, CD103 (an integrin) and killer immunoglobulin-like receptors. Notably, mouse models suggest that they lack CD16 and L-selectin, proteins that are prominent on pNKs (peripheral NK cells). There are also integrin families present in the membrane of uterine natural killer cells (α5β1, α4β1 and α6β1), the binding of which (by ligands fibronectin, vascular cell adhesion molecule 1, and laminin) induces certain uterine natural killer cell-specific effects (see 'Functions of uNK cells'). As with circulating natural killer cells, uterine natural killer cells also express immunoglobulin-like transcripts and natural cytotoxicity receptors.

== Origin ==
In humans, the Uterine natural killer cell population is low during the proliferative phase of the menstrual cycle. The number increases after ovulation by the migration of circulating natural killer cells, as well as differentiation of haematopoietic stem cells. The population of natural killer cells in the uterine tissue will only persist if pregnancy occurs. CD34(+) are stem cells that act as Natural Killer cell precursors. They have the capacity to develop into mature Uterine Natural Killer cells. An increase in CD34(+) in the endometrium results in increased chance of pregnancy and decreased chance on infertility. In implantation, endometrial CD34+ hematopoietic stem cell population increased (3.97% vs 0.69% P < 0.0004).

=== Origin of uterine natural killer cells during pregnancy ===
Based on studies using mouse models, both tissue resident natural killer cells and circulating natural killer cells are thought to contribute to the Uterine natural killer cell population during pregnancy. The origin of Uterine natural killer cells has been suggested to occur in two phases dependent on the stage of uterine tissue remodelling. At the onset of decidualisation, local proliferation of tissue resident natural killer cells occurs with little involvement from circulating natural killer cells. During the formation of the placenta, circulating natural killer cells are recruited.

== Functions ==
Uterine natural killer cells have an important role during pregnancy in both, humans and in mice. However, unlike natural killer cells, Uterine natural killer cells do not have a fundamental role in the innate immune system and therefore, are not cytotoxic. Throughout pregnancy, there is adaptation of the uterus to allow the growth of the foetus to occur. Studies in mice have shown that uterine natural killer cells have a key role in this remodelling. During the remodelling, spiral arteries undergo structural changes to allow adequate nutritional substances to supply the growing foetus. In mice, uterine natural killer cells were also found to produce growth-promoting factors which are important in early development before the placenta is fully formed.

== Localisation ==
Uterine natural killer cells accumulate during pregnancy, and this is thought to be the result of a two-wave process, beginning with proliferation of tissue resident natural killer cells in the decidua basalis, with minimal contribution to this pool from circulating natural killer cells from the blood stream. Later during placentation, circulating natural killer cells are thought to be recruited to aid with vascular remodelling. These cells are attracted to the uterus during pregnancy independent of chemokine receptors CCR-2 and CCR-5 in spite of these being important in recruitment of other inflammatory responses, and the exact method of their homing is yet to be understood.

== Role in disease ==
Uterine natural killer cells secrete trophoblast invasion promoting cytokines (IL-8 and IP-10) and various angiogenic factors required for remodelling maternal spinal arteries in order to support sufficient perfusion of the placenta in later pregnancy. Failure of this to occur can lead to miscarriage or pre-eclampsia.
