= Chronic deciduitis =

- Other names: Plasma cell deciduitis
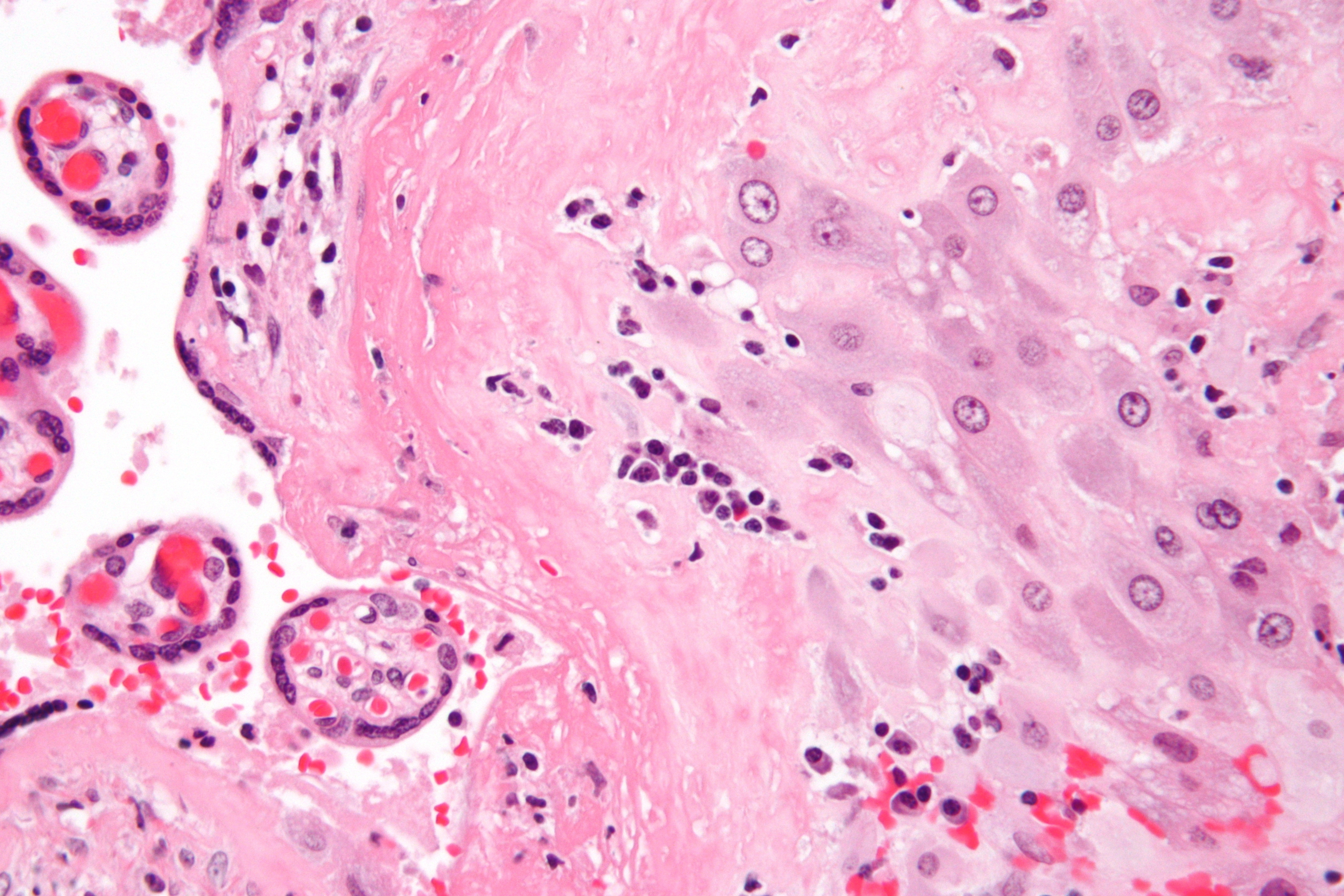
- Micrograph of a chronic deciduitis, showing the characteristic plasma cells. H&E stain.

Chronic deciduitis is a type of long-lasting inflammation that arises in pregnancy and affects the endometrial stromal tissue (decidua).

It is associated with preterm labour. The diagnosis rests primarily on the presence of plasma cells.

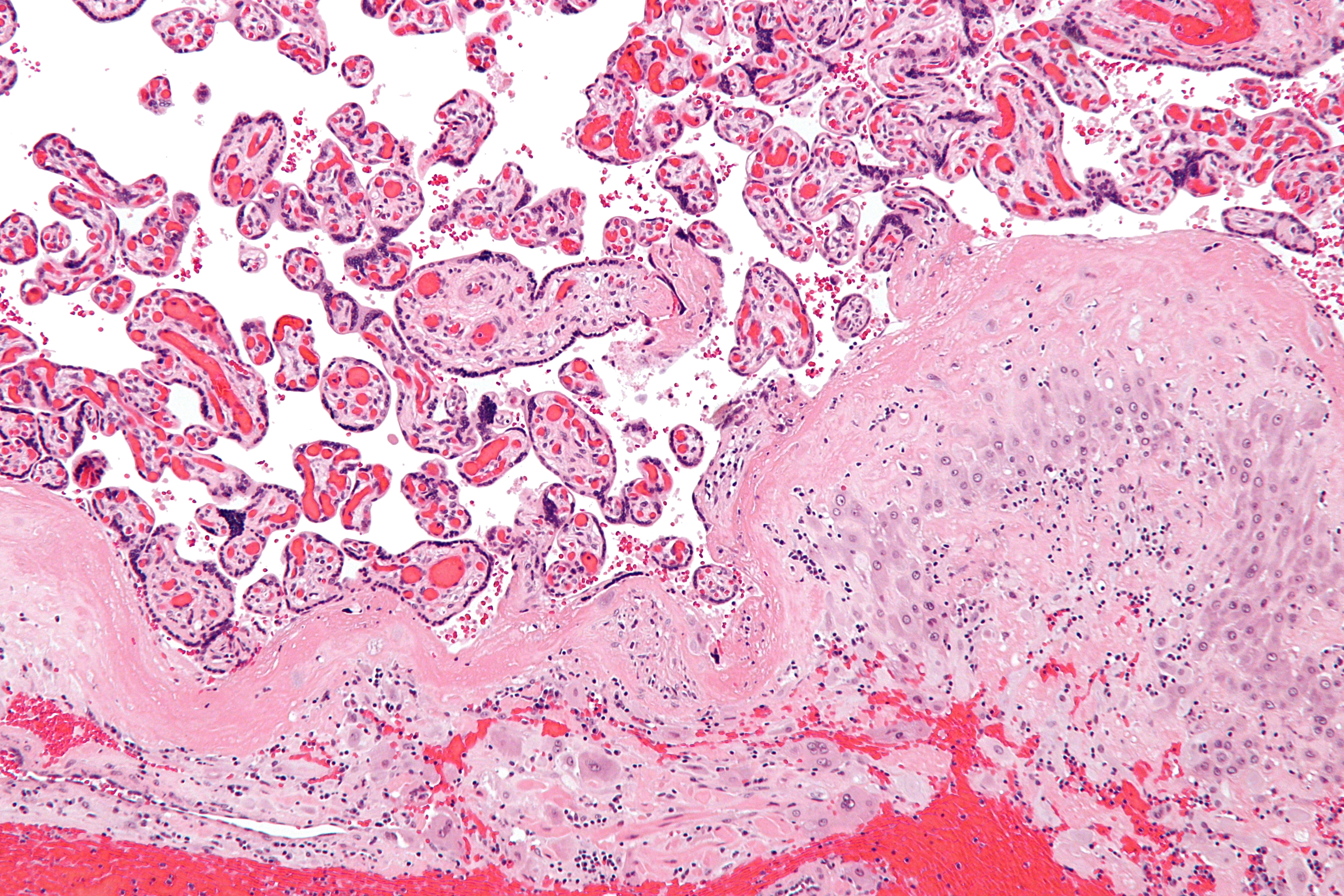
Intermed. mag.

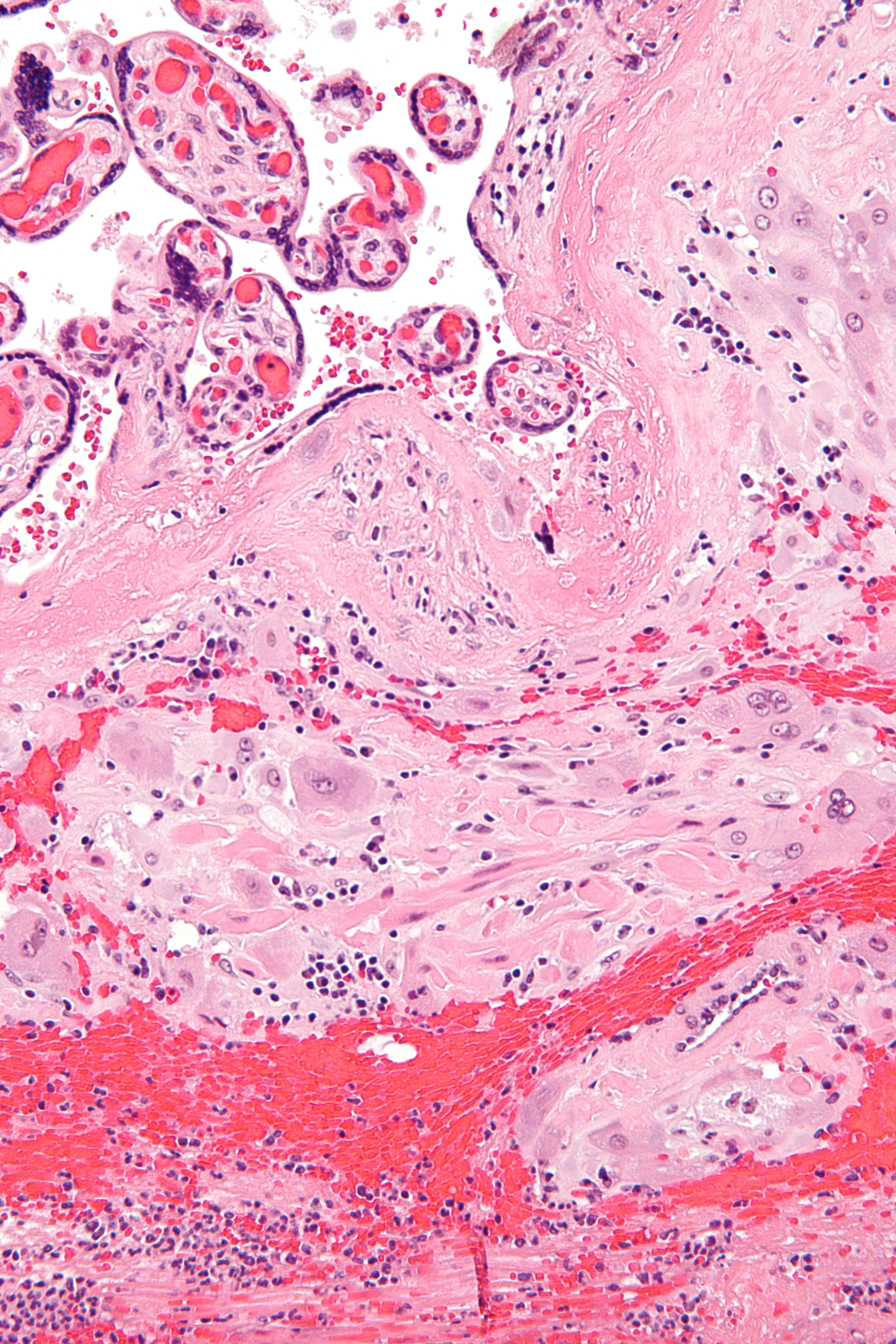
High mag.

Immunohistochemistry for CD138 highlighting plasma cells by granular membranous staining.

== See also ==
- Chorioamnionitis
- Decidua
