= Deciduous =

Plants that shed leaves seasonally

Deciduous forest
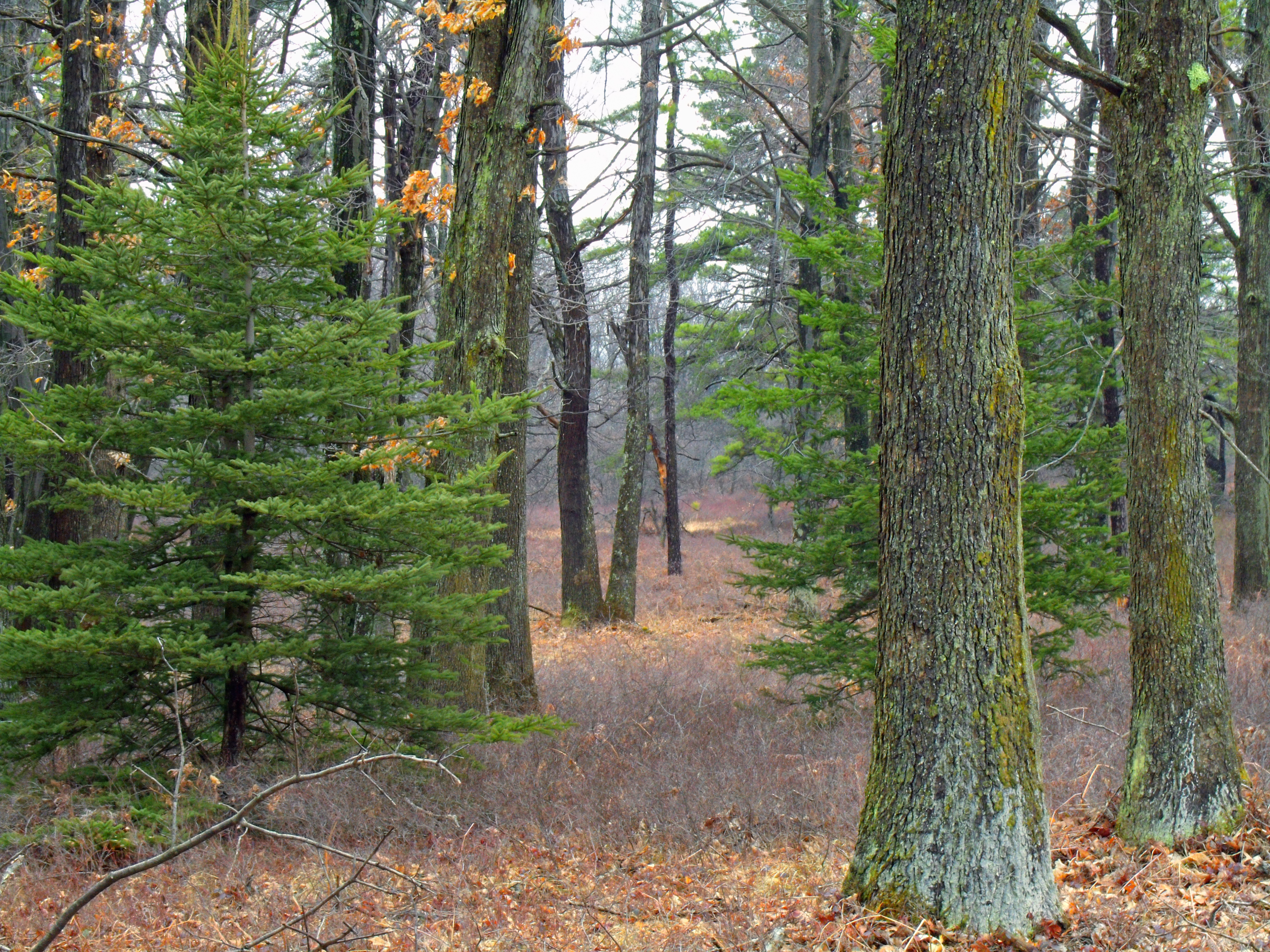
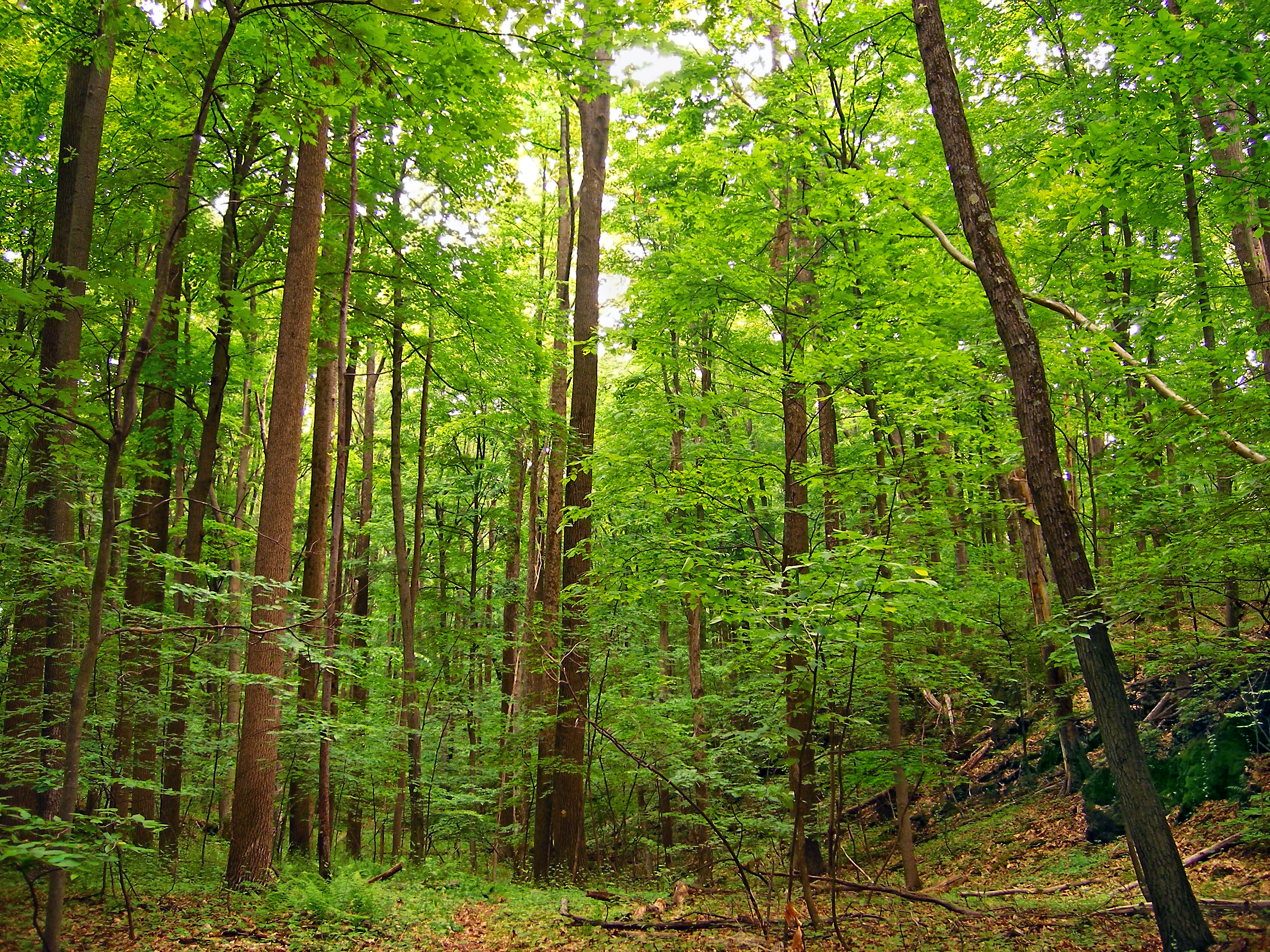
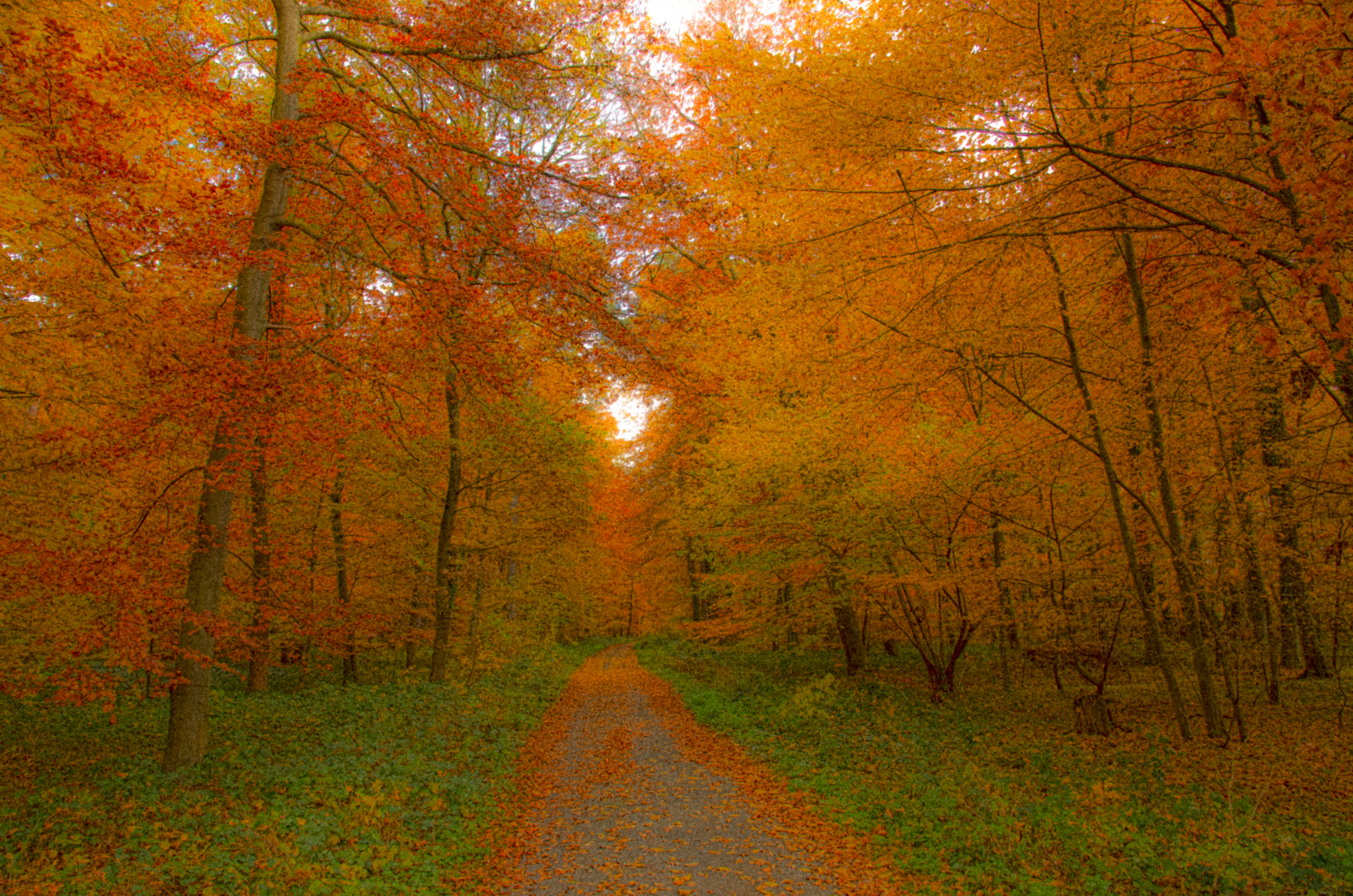
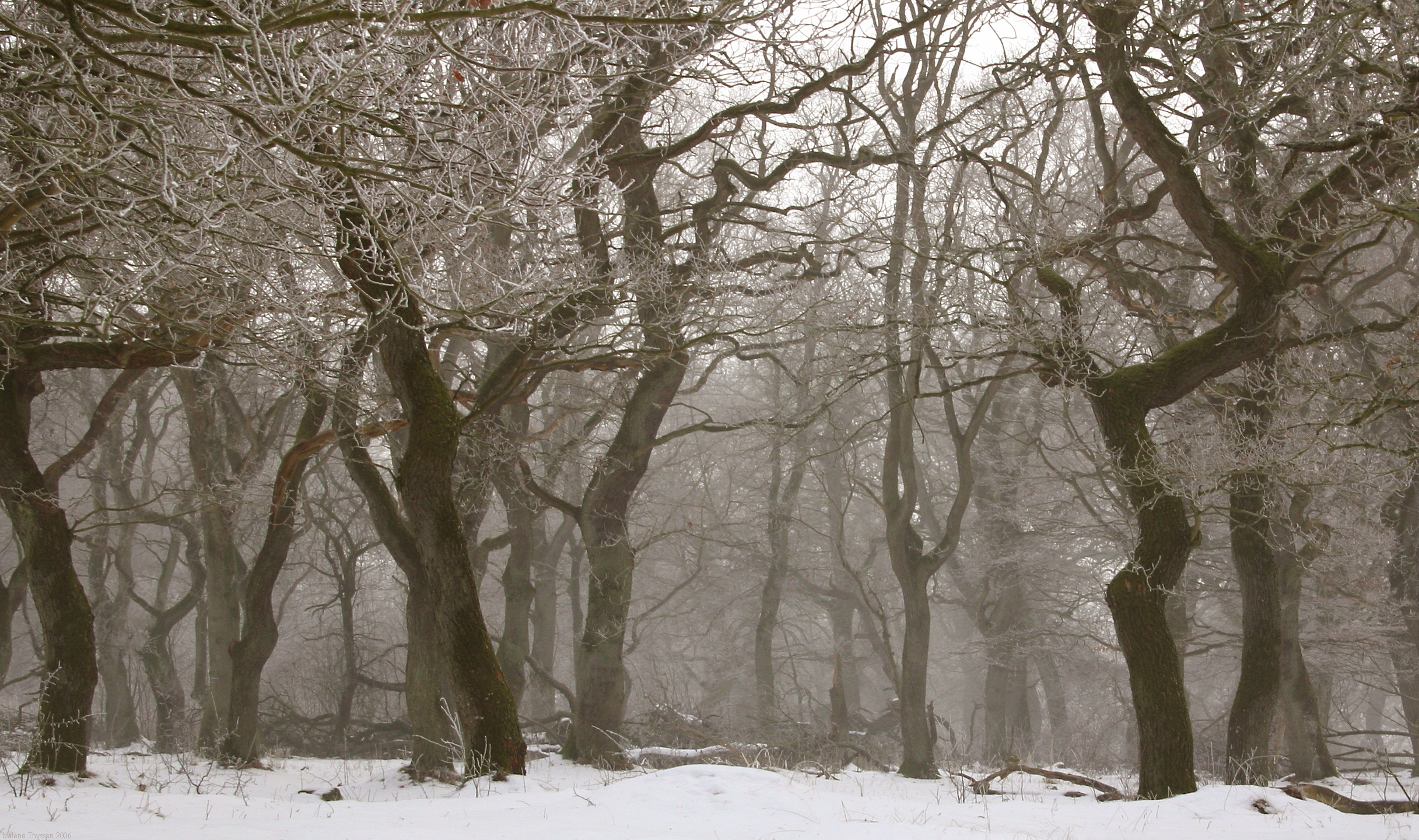
Four deciduous forests shown in spring, summer, autumn and winter.

In the fields of horticulture and botany, the term deciduous means "falling off at maturity" and "tending to fall off", in reference to trees and shrubs that seasonally shed leaves, usually in the autumn; To the shedding of petals, after flowering; and to the shedding of ripe fruit. The antonym of deciduous in the botanical sense is evergreen.

Generally, the term "deciduous" means "the dropping of a part that is no longer needed or useful" and the "falling away after its purpose is finished". In plants, it is the result of natural processes. "Deciduous" has a similar meaning when referring to animal parts, such as deciduous antlers in deer, deciduous teeth (baby teeth) in some mammals (including humans); or decidua, the uterine lining that sheds off after birth.

== Botany ==
In botany and horticulture, deciduous plants, including trees, shrubs and herbaceous perennials, are those that lose all of their leaves for part of the year. This process is called abscission. In some cases leaf loss coincides with winter—namely in temperate or polar climates. In other parts of the world, including tropical, subtropical, and arid regions, plants lose their leaves during the dry season or other seasons, depending on variations in rainfall.

The converse of deciduous is evergreen, where foliage is shed on a different schedule from deciduous plants, therefore appearing to remain green year round because not all the leaves are shed at the same time. Plants that are intermediate may be called semi-deciduous; they lose old foliage as new growth begins. Other plants are semi-evergreen and lose their leaves before the next growing season, retaining some during winter or dry periods.

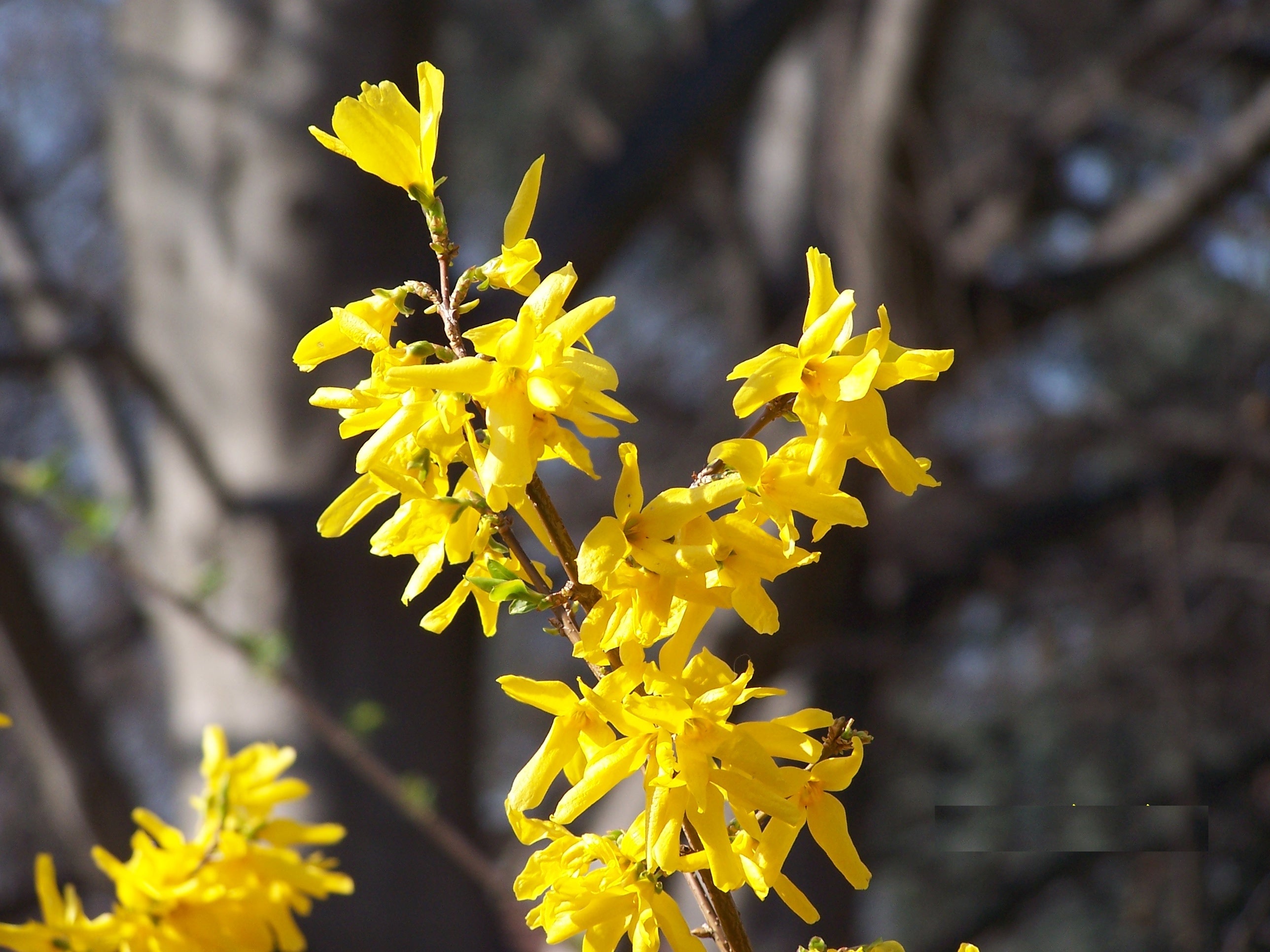
Like a number of other deciduous plants, Forsythia flowers during the leafless season.

Many deciduous plants flower during the period when they are leafless, as this increases the effectiveness of pollination. The absence of leaves improves wind transmission of pollen for wind-pollinated plants and increases the visibility of the flowers to insects in insect-pollinated plants. This strategy is not without risks, as the flowers can be damaged by frost or, in dry season regions, result in water stress on the plant.

Spring leafout and fall leaf drop are triggered by a combination of daylight and air temperatures. The exact conditions required will vary with the species, but generally more cold-tolerant genera such as Salix will leaf out earlier and lose their leaves later, while genera such as Fraxinus and Juglans leaf out later, and drop their leaves earlier. They will be among the earliest trees to lose their leaves in the fall. In sub-Arctic climates such as Alaska, leaves begin turning color as early as August. However, for most temperate regions it takes place in late September to early November and in subtropical climates such as the southern United States, it may be November into December.

Leaf drop or abscission involves complex physiological signals and changes within plants. When leafout is completed (marked by the transition from bright green spring leaves to dark green summer ones) the chlorophyll level in the leaves remains stable until cool temperatures arrive in autumn. When autumn arrives and the days are shorter or when plants are drought-stressed, the chlorophyll steadily breaks down, allowing other pigments present in the leaf to become apparent and resulting in non-green colored foliage. The brightest leaf colors are produced when days grow short and nights are cool, but remain above freezing. These other pigments include carotenoids that are yellow, brown, and orange. Anthocyanin pigments produce red and purple colors, though they are not always present in the leaves. Rather, they are produced in the foliage in late summer, when sugars are trapped in the leaves after the process of abscission begins. Parts of the world that have showy displays of bright autumn colors are limited to locations where days become short and nights are cool. The New England region of the United States and southeastern Canada tend to produce particularly good autumn colors for this reason, with Europe producing generally poorer colors due to the humid maritime climate and lower overall species diversity. It is also a factor that the continental United States and southern Canada are at a lower latitude than northern Europe, so the sun during the fall months is higher and stronger. This combination of strong sun and cool temperatures leads to more intense fall colors. The Southern United States also has poor fall colors due to warm temperatures during the fall months and the Western United States as it has more evergreen and fewer deciduous plants, combined with the West Coast and its maritime climate. (See also: Autumn leaf color) Most of the Southern Hemisphere lacks deciduous plants due to its milder winters and smaller landmass, most of which is nearer the equator with only southern South America, the South Island of New Zealand, and southern Australia, particularly Tasmania and Victoria, producing distinct fall colors.

The beginning of leaf drop starts when an abscission layer is formed between the leaf petiole and the stem. This layer is formed in the spring during active new growth of the leaf; it consists of layers of cells that can separate from each other. The cells are sensitive to a plant hormone called auxin that is produced by the leaf and other parts of the plant. When auxin coming from the leaf is produced at a rate consistent with that from the body of the plant, the cells of the abscission layer remain connected; in autumn, or when under stress, the auxin flow from the leaf decreases or stops, triggering cellular elongation within the abscission layer. The elongation of these cells breaks the connection between the different cell layers, allowing the leaf to break away from the plant. It also forms a layer that seals the break, so the plant does not lose sap.

Some trees, particularly oaks and beeches, exhibit a behavior known as "marcescence" whereby dead leaves are not shed in the autumn and remain on the tree until being blown off by the weather. This is caused by incomplete development of the abscission layer. It is mainly seen in the seedling and sapling stage, although mature trees may have marcescence of leaves on the lower branches.

A number of deciduous plants remove nitrogen and carbon from the foliage before they are shed and store them in the form of proteins in the vacuoles of parenchyma cells in the roots and the inner bark. In the spring, these proteins are used as a nitrogen source during the growth of new leaves or flowers.

=== Function ===
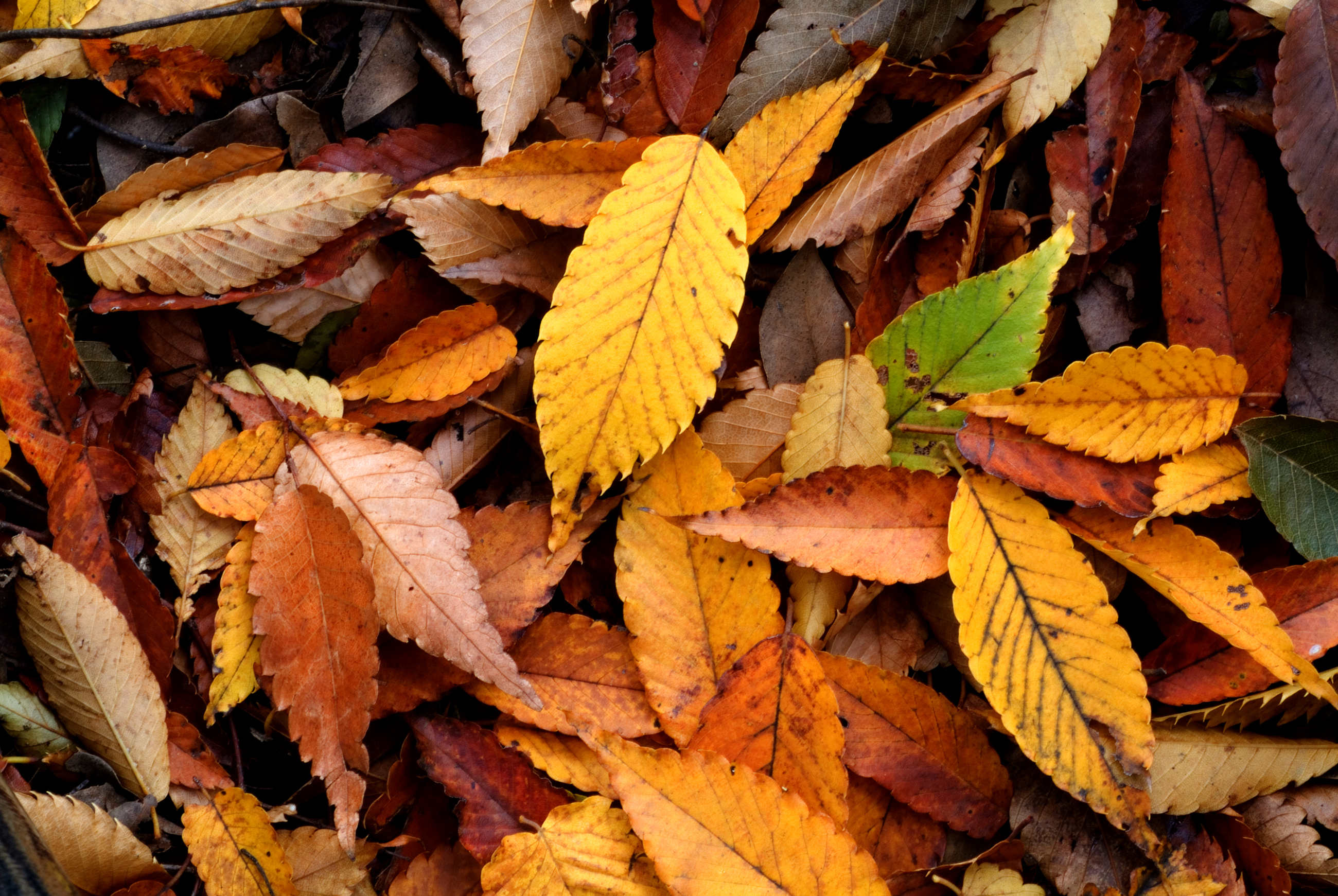
Deciduous plants in mid- to high latitudes shed their leaves as temperatures drop in autumn.

Plants with deciduous foliage have advantages and disadvantages compared to plants with evergreen foliage.
Since deciduous plants lose their leaves to conserve water or to better survive winter weather conditions, they must regrow new foliage during the next suitable growing season; this uses resources which evergreens do not need to expend.
Evergreens suffer greater water loss during the winter and they also can experience greater predation pressure, especially when small. Deciduous trees experience much less branch and trunk breakage from glaze ice storms when leafless, and plants can reduce water loss due to the reduction in availability of liquid water during cold winter days.

Losing leaves in winter may reduce damage from insects; repairing leaves and keeping them functional may be more costly than just losing and regrowing them. Removing leaves also reduces cavitation which can damage xylem vessels in plants. This then allows deciduous plants to have xylem vessels with larger diameters and therefore a greater rate of transpiration (and hence CO_{2} uptake as this occurs when stomata are open) during the summer growth period.

==== Deciduous woody plants ====
The deciduous characteristic has developed repeatedly among woody plants. Trees include most maples, many oaks and nothofagus, elm, beech, aspen, and birch, among others, as well as a number of coniferous genera, such as larch and Metasequoia. Deciduous shrubs include honeysuckle, viburnum, and many others. Many temperate woody vines are also deciduous, including Actinidia, grapes, poison-ivy, Virginia creeper, wisteria, etc. The characteristic is useful in plant identification; for instance in the Mediterranean region, and parts of California and the American Southeast, deciduous and evergreen oak species may grow side by side. However there are no deciduous species among the woody monocotyledonous plants, e.g. palms, yuccas, and dracaenas.

Periods of leaf fall often coincide with seasons; winter in the case of cool-climate plants, or the dry season in the case of tropical plants.

=== Regions ===
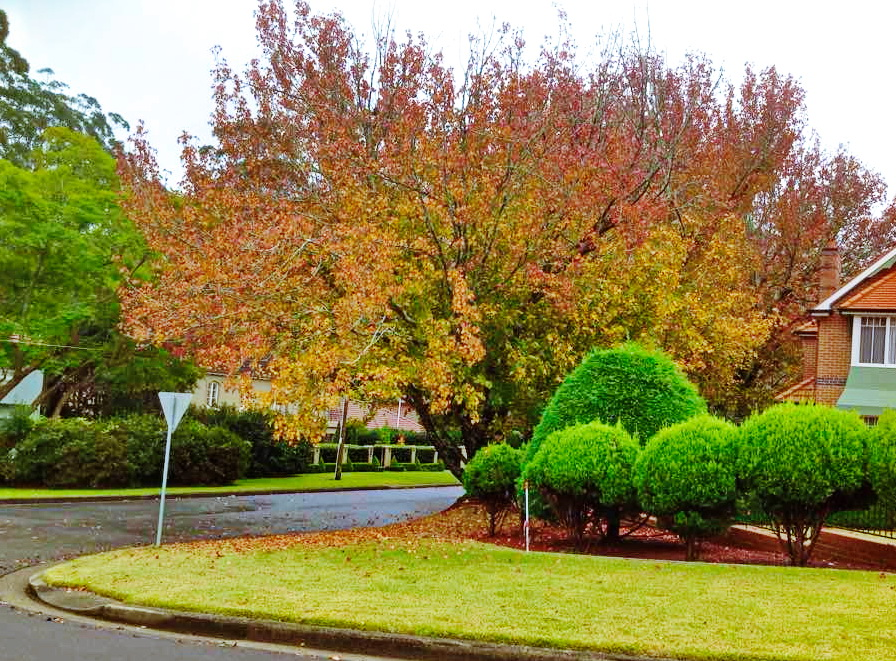
Deciduous trees were introduced to the temperate regions of Australia where they are used as ornamental plants, as seen here at a suburban street in Sydney.

Forests where a majority of the trees lose their foliage at the end of the typical growing season are called deciduous forests. These forests are found in many areas worldwide and have distinctive ecosystems, understory growth, and soil dynamics.

Two distinctive types of deciduous forests are found growing around the world.

Temperate deciduous forest biomes are plant communities distributed in North and South America, Asia, Southern slopes of the Himalayas, Europe and for cultivation purposes in Oceania. They have formed under climatic conditions which have great seasonable temperature variability. Growth occurs during warm summers, leaf drop in autumn, and dormancy during cold winters. These seasonally distinctive communities have diverse life forms that are impacted greatly by the seasonality of their climate, mainly temperature and precipitation rates. These varying and regionally different ecological conditions produce distinctive forest plant communities in different regions.

Tropical and subtropical deciduous forest biomes have developed in response not to seasonal temperature variations but to seasonal rainfall patterns. During prolonged dry periods the foliage is dropped to conserve water and prevent death from drought. Leaf drop is not seasonally dependent as it is in temperate climates. It can occur any time of year and varies by region of the world. Even within a small local area there can be variations in the timing and duration of leaf drop; different sides of the same mountain and areas that have high water tables or areas along streams and rivers can produce a patchwork of leafy and leafless trees.

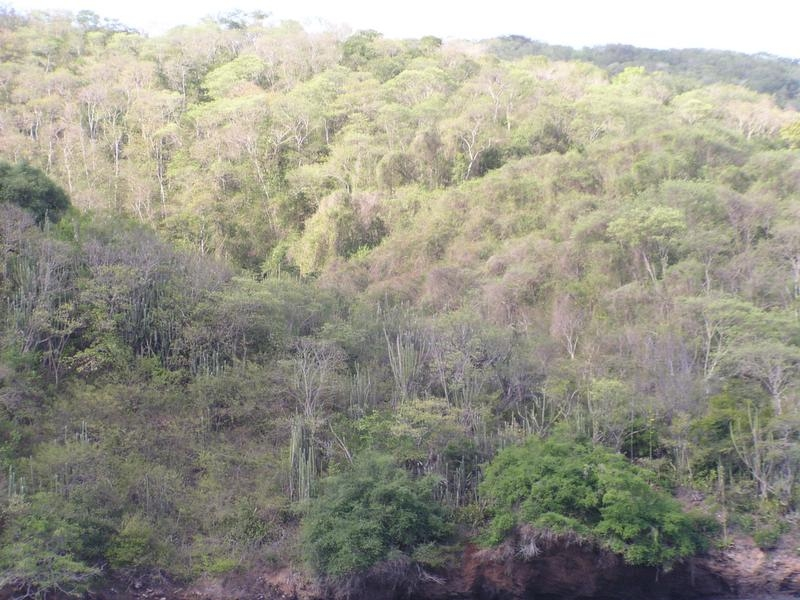
Dry-season deciduous tropical forest

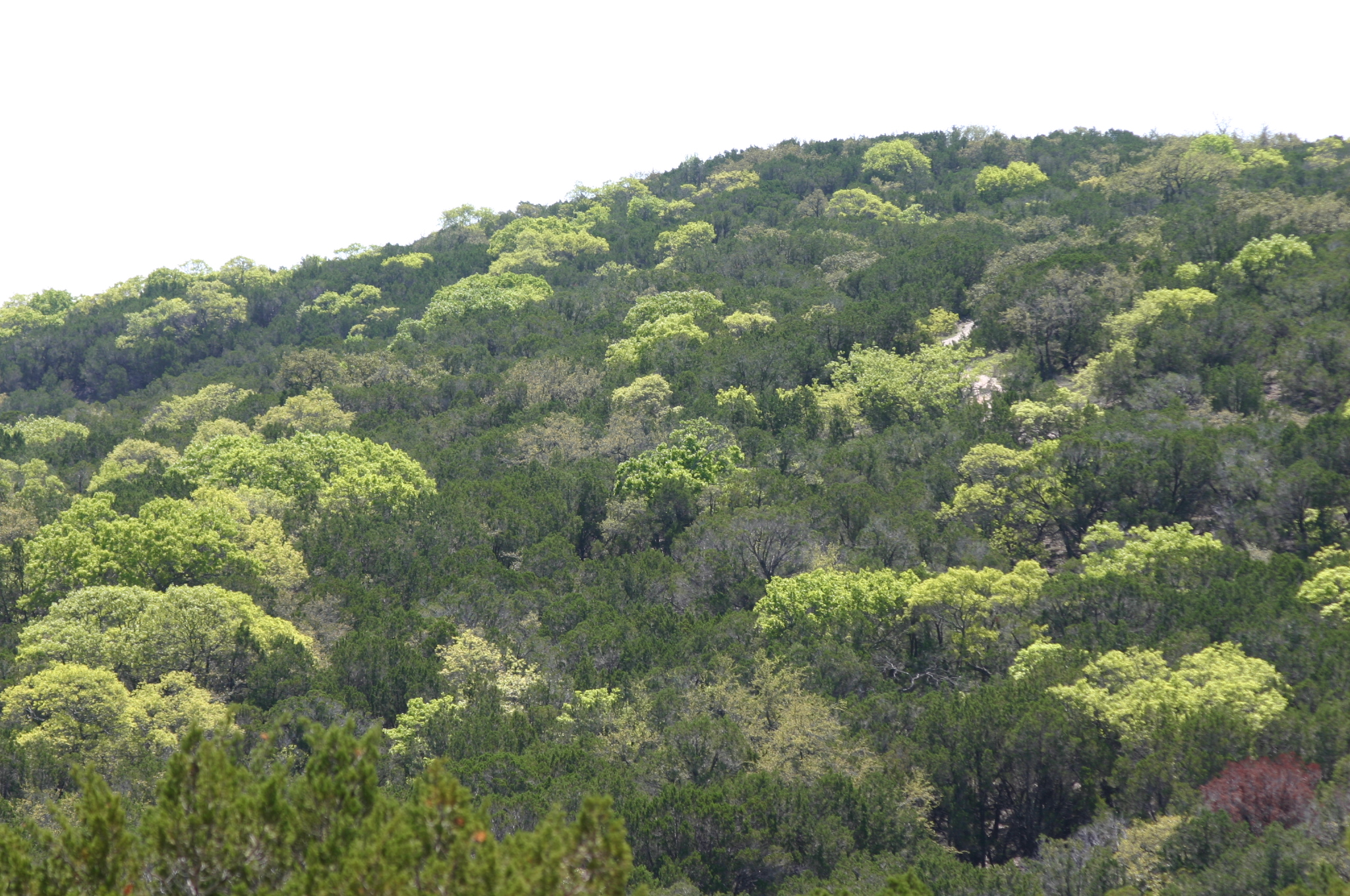
Mixed tropical and subtropical deciduous forest in Spring-time. Texas, United States

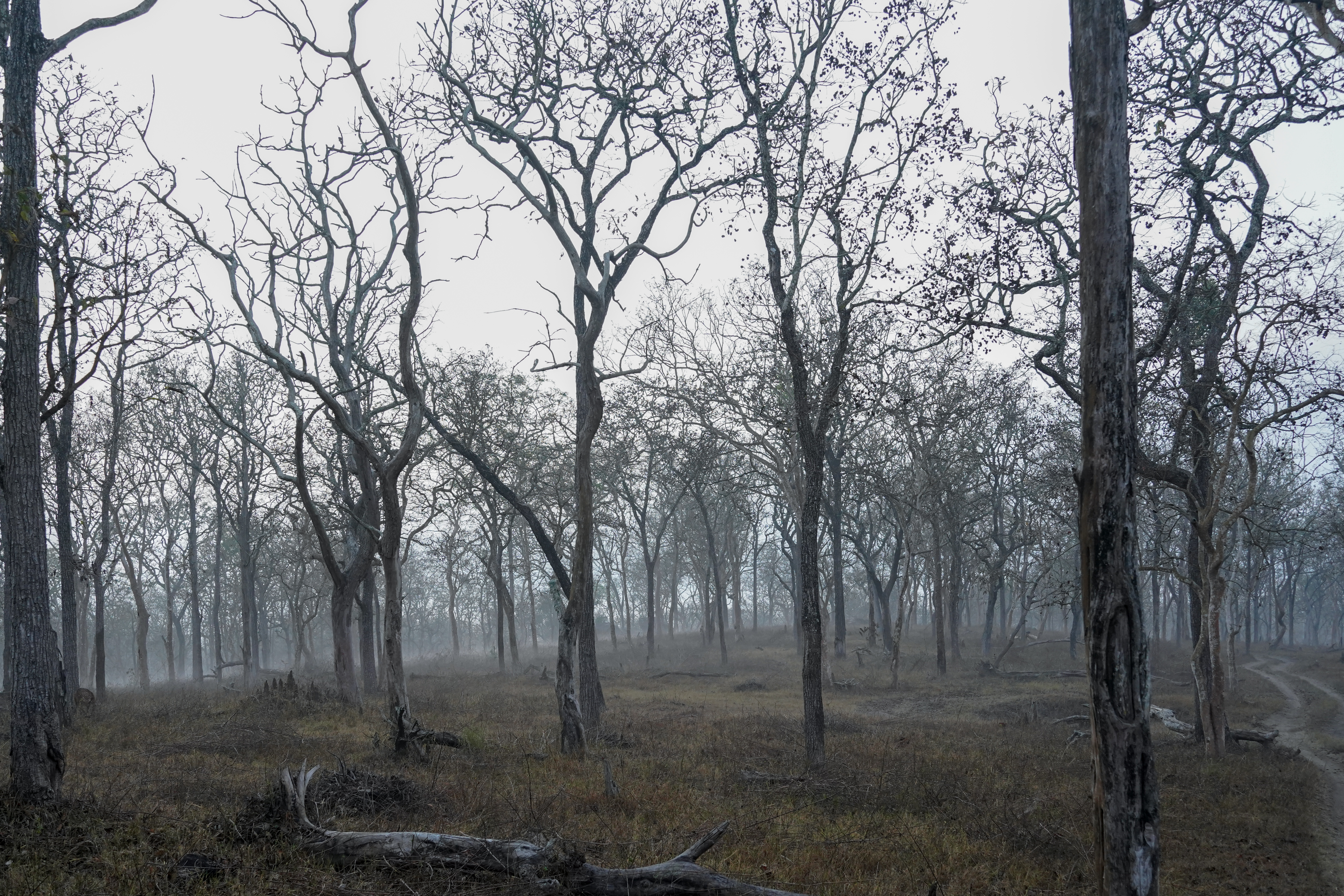
Tropical dry deciduous forests in southern India in the Mudumalai Tiger Reserve

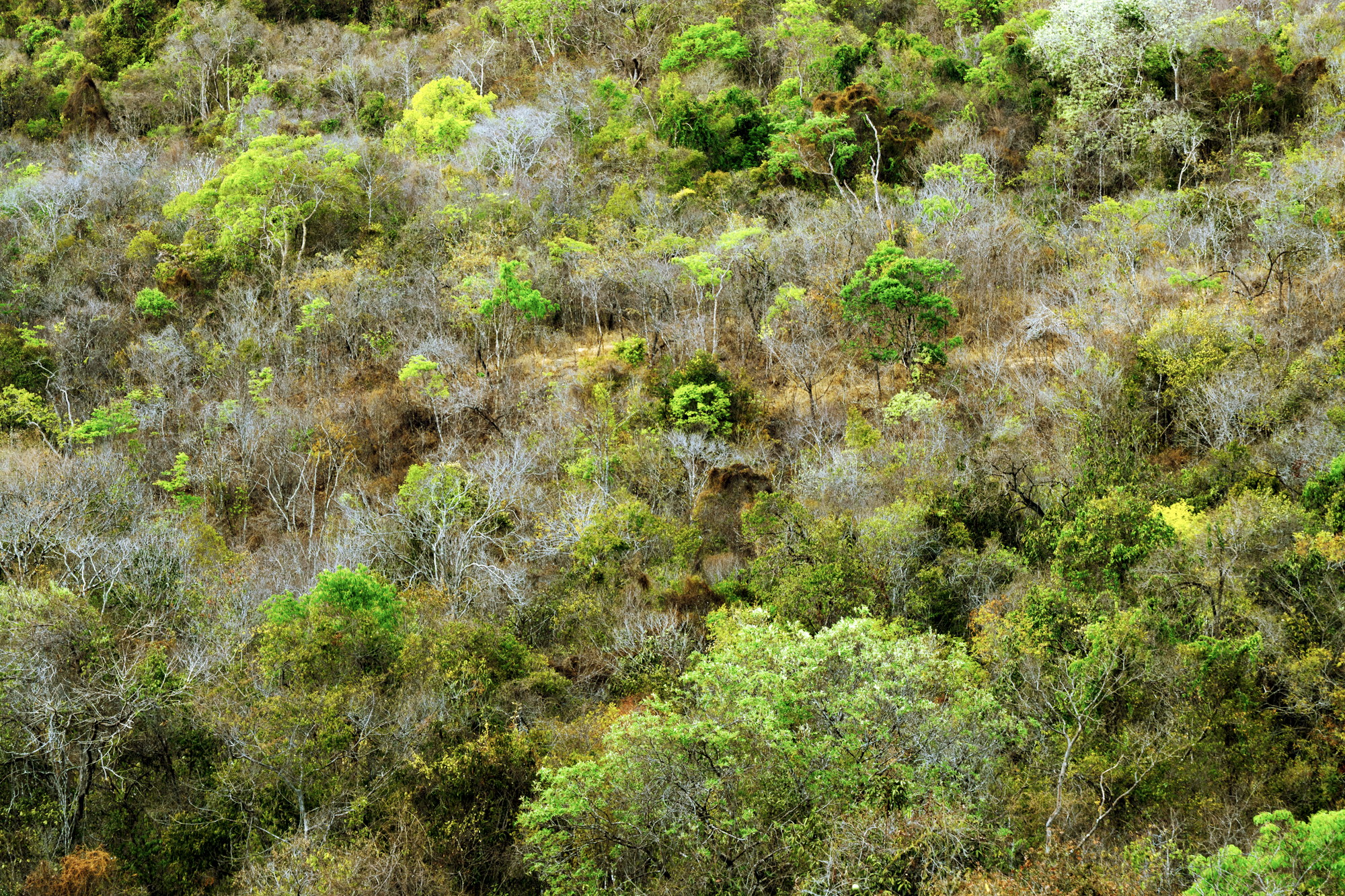
Madagascar dry deciduous forests during the end of the dry season, with many trees lacking leaves.
