= Cytokine-like protein 1 =

Protein-coding gene in the species Homo sapiens

CYTL1

Identifiers
- Aliases: CYTL1, C17, C4orf4, cytokine like 1
- External IDs: OMIM: 607930; MGI: 2684993; GeneCards: CYTL1

Gene location (Human)
Chr.	Chromosome 4 (human)
Band	4p16.2	Start	5,014,586 bp
Band	4p16.2	End	5,019,458 bp

Gene location (Mouse)
Chr.	Chromosome 5 (mouse)
Band	5|5 B3	Start	37,892,863 bp
Band	5|5 B3	End	37,897,164 bp
RNA expression pattern
Bgee	Human / Mouse (ortholog); Top expressed in: tibia; trachea; ascending aorta; Descending thoracic aorta; cartilage tissue; trabecular bone; canal of the cervix; popliteal artery; tibial arteries; ectocervix / Top expressed in: skin of external ear; intercostal muscle; interventricular septum; ankle; basilar part of occipital bone; aorta; laryngeal cartilages; right lung lobe; stria vascularis; aortic valve; More reference expression data
BioGPS	n/a
Gene ontology
Molecular function	signaling receptor binding
Cellular component	extracellular region; extracellular space
Biological process	inner ear development; chondroitin sulfate proteoglycan biosynthetic process; positive regulation of DNA-binding transcription factor activity; cartilage homeostasis; chondrocyte differentiation; signal transduction; positive regulation of transcription by RNA polymerase II
Sources:Amigo / QuickGO
Orthologs
Databases	NCBI: entry; OMA: entry
Species	Human	Mouse
Entrez	54360	231162
Ensembl	ENSG00000170891	ENSMUSG00000062329
UniProt	Q9NRR1	A1E5L0
RefSeq (mRNA)	NM_018659	NM_001081106
RefSeq (protein)	NP_061129	NP_001074575
Location (UCSC)	Chr 4: 5.01 – 5.02 Mb	Chr 5: 37.89 – 37.9 Mb
PubMed search
- Wikidata
View/Edit Human	View/Edit Mouse

Cytokine-like protein 1 (also protein C17) is a protein that in humans is encoded by the CYTL1 gene.

== Function ==
Protein C17 is a cytokine-like protein specifically expressed in bone marrow and cord blood mononuclear cells that bear the CD34 surface marker. Functionally, C17 was identified as a secretory protein expressed in CD34+ haemopoietic cells. CYTL1 seems to regulate chondrogenesis and is required for the maintenance of cartilage homeostasis and might, additionally, work as a regulatory factor in embryo implantation in the stage of early pregnancy.

This family of proteins, C17, is found in vertebrates. Proteins have two conserved sequence motifs: PPTCYSR and DDC.
