= Endometrium =

Lining of the mammalian uterus

- Uterus and fallopian tubes (uterine tubes). (Endometrium labeled at center right.)

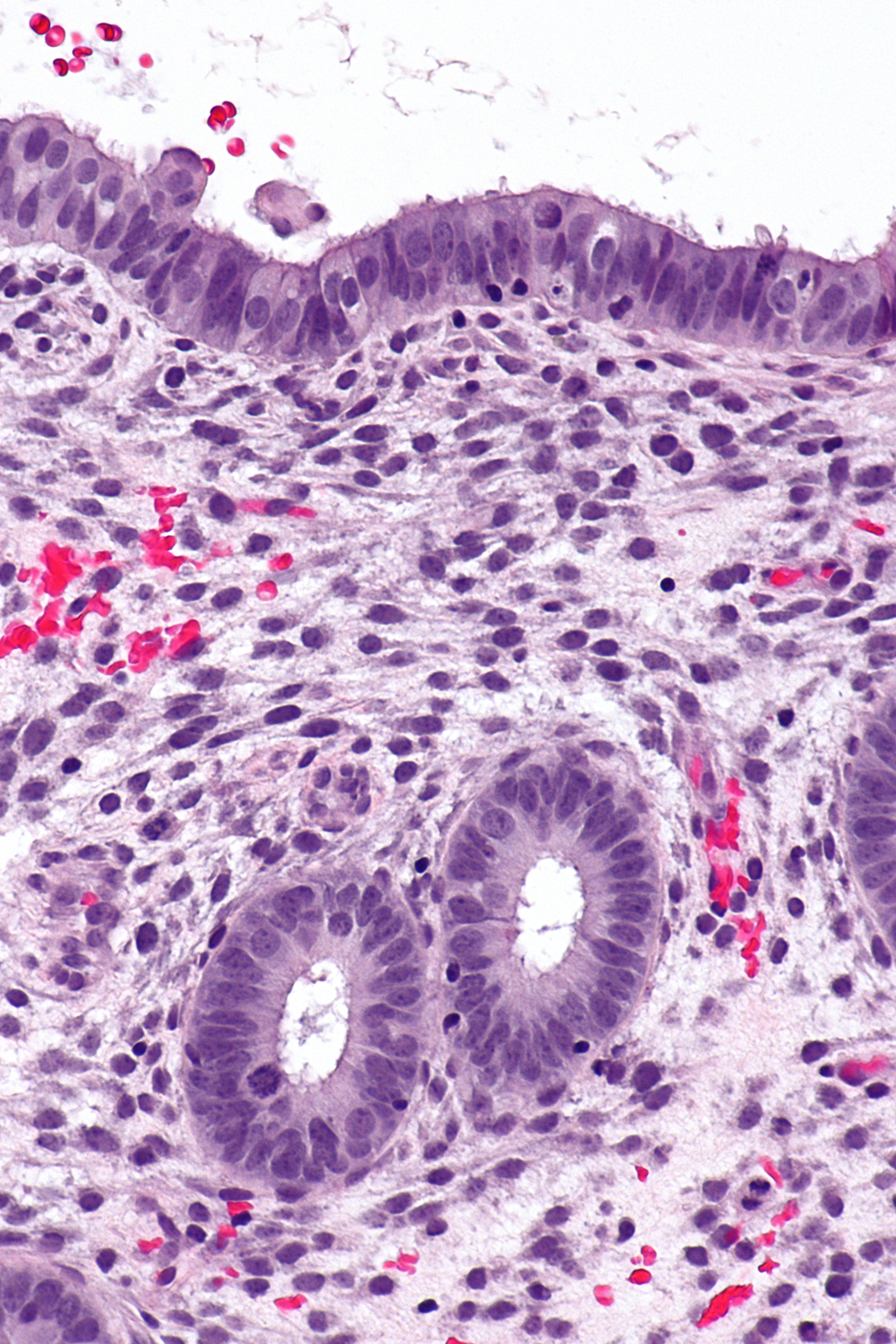
- Endometrium in the proliferative phase

Details
- Part of: Uterus

Identifiers
- Latin: tunica mucosa uteri
- MeSH: D004717
- TA98: A09.1.03.027
- TA2: 3521
- FMA: 17742

The endometrium is the inner lining of the uterus (womb) in mammals. It has a basal layer and a functional layer: the basal layer contains stem cells which regenerate the functional layer. The functional layer thickens and then is shed during menstruation in humans and some other mammals, including other apes, Old World monkeys, some species of bat, the elephant shrew and the Cairo spiny mouse. In most other mammals, the endometrium is reabsorbed in the estrous cycle. During pregnancy, the glands and blood vessels in the endometrium further increase in size and number. Vascular spaces fuse and become interconnected, forming the placenta, which supplies oxygen and nutrition to the embryo and fetus. The endometrium was historically seen as sterile, but is now known to have a microbial community.

== Structure ==
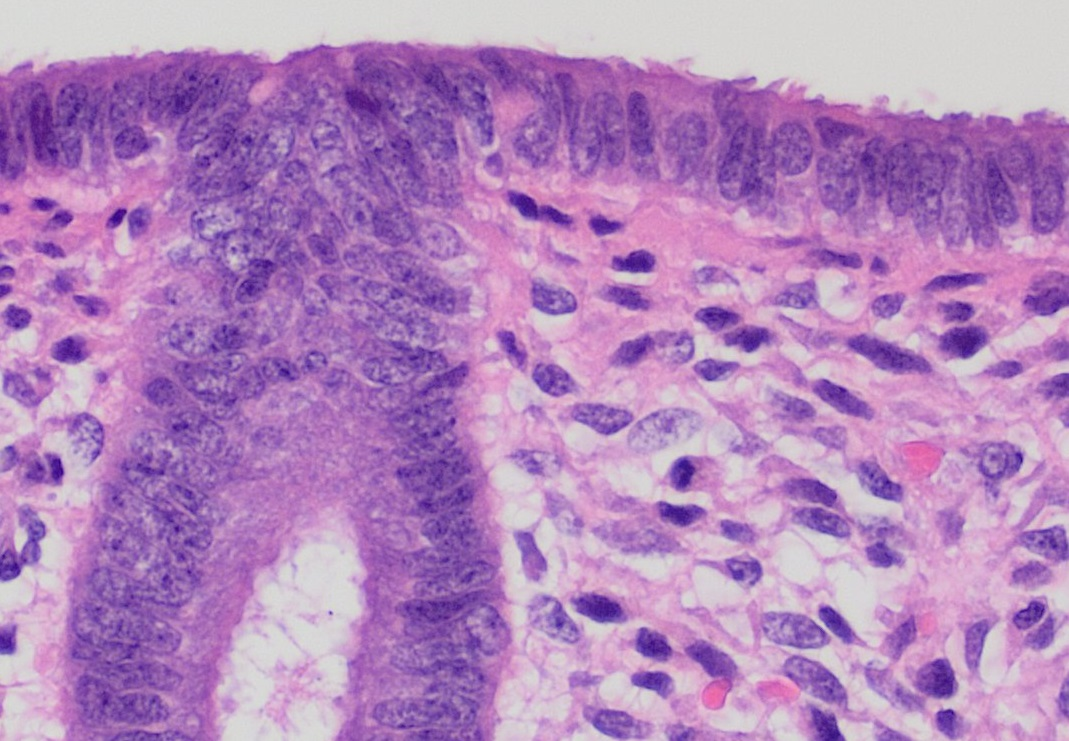
Histology of the most superficial layer of the endometrium, consisting of a simple columnar epithelium. H&E stain

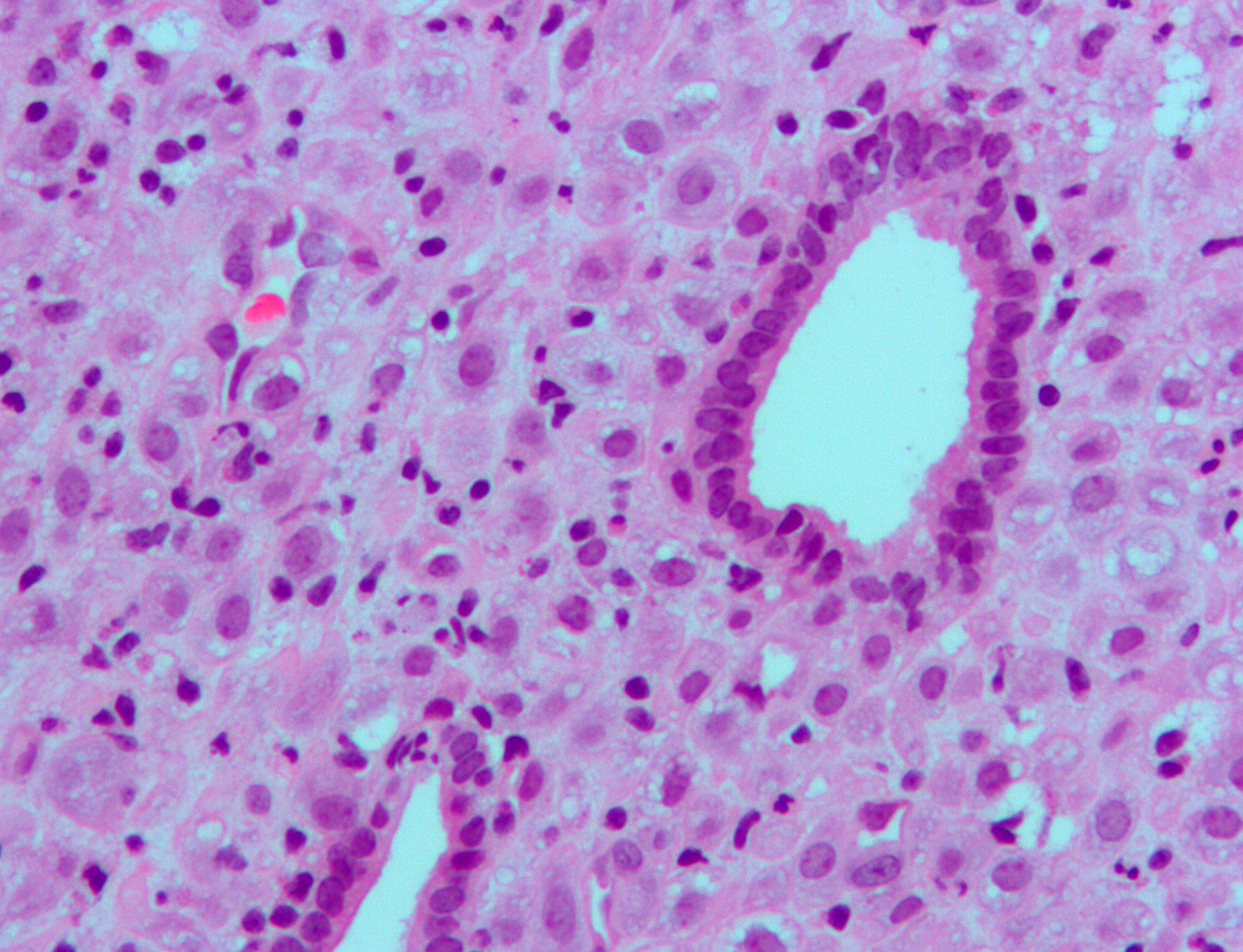
High magnification micrograph of decidualized endometrium due to exogenous progesterone (oral contraceptive pill). H&E stain

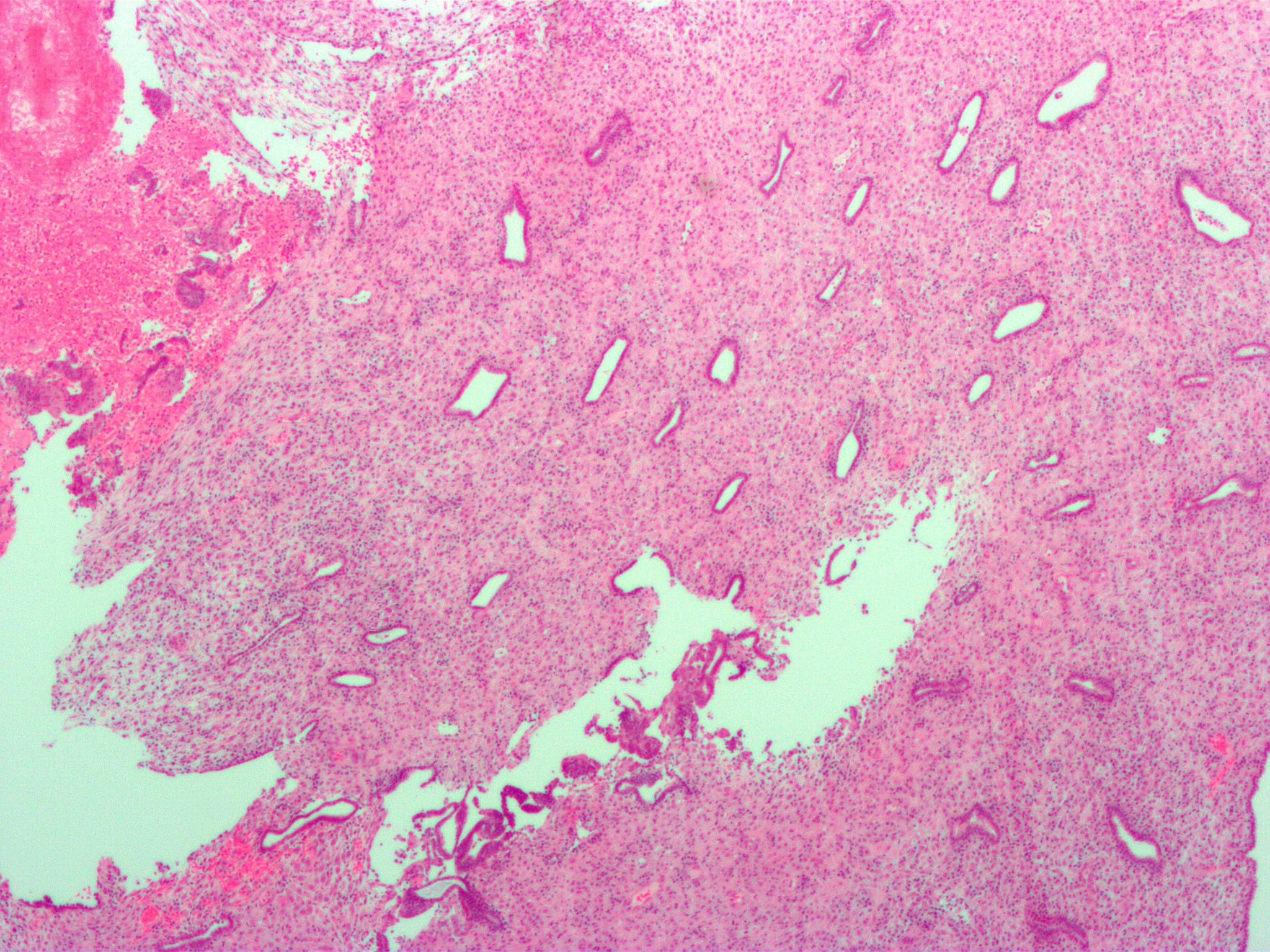
Low magnification micrograph of decidualized endometrium. H&E stain

The endometrium consists of a single layer of columnar epithelium plus the stroma on which it rests. The stroma is a layer of connective tissue that varies in thickness according to hormonal influences. In the uterus, simple tubular glands reach from the endometrial surface through to the base of the stroma, which also carries a rich blood supply provided by the spiral arteries. In women of reproductive age, two layers of endometrium can be distinguished. These two layers occur only in the endometrium lining the cavity of the uterus, and not in the lining of the fallopian tubes where a potentially life-threatening ectopic pregnancy may occur nearby.

- The functional layer is adjacent to the uterine cavity. This layer is built up after the end of menstruation during the first part of the previous menstrual cycle. Proliferation is induced by estrogen (follicular phase of menstrual cycle), and later changes in this layer are engendered by progesterone from the corpus luteum (luteal phase). It is adapted to provide an optimum environment for the implantation and growth of the embryo. This layer is completely shed during menstruation.
- The basal layer, adjacent to the myometrium and below the functional layer, is not shed at any time during the menstrual cycle. It contains stem cells that regenerate the functional layer, which develops on top of it.

In the absence of progesterone, the arteries supplying blood to the functional layer constrict, so that cells in that layer become ischaemic and die, leading to menstruation.

It is possible to identify the phase of the menstrual cycle by reference to either the ovarian cycle or the uterine cycle by observing microscopic differences at each phase—for example in the ovarian cycle:

| Phase | Days | Thickness | Epithelium |
|---|---|---|---|
| Menstrual phase | 1–5 | Thin | Absent |
| Follicular phase | 5–14 | Intermediate | Columnar |
| Luteal phase | 15–27 | Thick | Columnar. Also visible are arcuate vessels of uterus |
| Ischemic phase | 27–28 | | Columnar. Also visible are arcuate vessels of uterus |

=== Gene and protein expression ===
About 20,000 protein coding genes are expressed in human cells and some 70% of these genes are expressed in the normal endometrium. Just over 100 of these genes are more specifically expressed in the endometrium with only a handful genes being highly endometrium specific. The corresponding specific proteins are expressed in the glandular and stromal cells of the endometrial mucosa. The expression of many of these proteins vary depending on the menstrual cycle, for example the progesterone receptor and thyrotropin-releasing hormone both expressed in the proliferative phase, and PAEP expressed in the secretory phase. Other proteins such as the HOX11 protein that is required for female fertility, is expressed in endometrial stroma cells throughout the menstrual cycle. Certain specific proteins such as the estrogen receptor are also expressed in other types of female tissue types, such as the cervix, fallopian tubes, ovaries and breast.

=== Microbiome speculation ===
The uterus and endometrium was for a long time thought to be sterile. The cervical plug of mucosa was seen to prevent the entry of any microorganisms ascending from the vagina. In the 1980s this view was challenged when it was shown that uterine infections could arise from weaknesses in the barrier of the cervical plug. Organisms from the vaginal microbiota could enter the uterus during uterine contractions in the menstrual cycle. Further studies sought to identify microbiota specific to the uterus which would be of help in identifying cases of unsuccessful IVF and miscarriages. Their findings were seen to be unreliable due to the possibility of cross-contamination in the sampling procedures used. The well-documented presence of Lactobacillus species, for example, was easily explained by an increase in the vaginal population being able to seep into the cervical mucous. Another study highlighted the flaws of the earlier studies including cross-contamination. It was also argued that the evidence from studies using germ-free offspring of axenic animals (germ-free) clearly showed the sterility of the uterus. The authors concluded that in light of these findings there was no existence of a microbiome.

The normal dominance of Lactobacilli in the vagina is seen as a marker for vaginal health. However, in the uterus this much lower population is seen as invasive in a closed environment that is highly regulated by female sex hormones, and that could have unwanted consequences. In studies of endometriosis Lactobacillus is not the dominant type and there are higher levels of Streptococcus and Staphylococcus species. Half of the cases of bacterial vaginitis showed a polymicrobial biofilm attached to the endometrium.

== Function ==
The endometrium is the innermost lining layer of the uterus, and functions to prevent adhesions between the opposed walls of the myometrium, thereby maintaining the patency of the uterine cavity. During the menstrual cycle or estrous cycle, the endometrium grows to a thick, blood vessel-rich, glandular tissue layer. This represents an optimal environment for the implantation of a blastocyst upon its arrival in the uterus. The endometrium is central, echogenic (detectable using ultrasound scanners), and has an average thickness of 6.7 mm.

During pregnancy, the glands and blood vessels in the endometrium further increase in size and number. Vascular spaces fuse and become interconnected, forming the placenta, which supplies oxygen and nutrition to the embryo and fetus.

=== Cycle ===
The functional layer of the endometrial lining undergoes cyclic regeneration from stem cells in the basal layer. Humans, apes, and some other species display the menstrual cycle, whereas most other mammals are subject to an estrous cycle. In both cases, the endometrium initially proliferates under the influence of estrogen. However, once ovulation occurs, the ovary (specifically the corpus luteum) will produce much larger amounts of progesterone. This changes the proliferative pattern of the endometrium to a secretory lining. Eventually, the secretory lining provides a hospitable environment for one or more blastocysts.

Upon fertilization, the egg may implant into the uterine wall and provide feedback to the body with human chorionic gonadotropin (hCG). hCG provides continued feedback throughout pregnancy by maintaining the corpus luteum, which will continue its role of releasing progesterone and estrogen. In case of implantation, the endometrial lining remains as decidua. The decidua becomes part of the placenta; it provides support and protection for the gestation.

Without implantation of a fertilized egg, the endometrial lining is either reabsorbed (estrous cycle) or shed (menstrual cycle). In the latter case, the process of shedding involves the breaking down of the lining, the tearing of small connective blood vessels, and the loss of the tissue and blood that had constituted it through the vagina. The entire process occurs over a period of several days. Menstruation may be accompanied by a series of uterine contractions; these help expel the menstrual endometrium.

If there is inadequate stimulation of the lining, due to lack of hormones, the endometrium remains thin and inactive. In humans, this will result in amenorrhea, or the absence of a menstrual period. After menopause, the lining is often described as being atrophic. In contrast, endometrium that is chronically exposed to estrogens, but not to progesterone, may become hyperplastic. Long-term use of oral contraceptives with highly potent progestins can also induce endometrial atrophy.

In humans, the cycle of building and shedding the endometrial lining lasts an average of 28 days. The endometrium develops at different rates in different mammals. Various factors including the seasons, climate, and stress can affect its development. The endometrium itself produces certain hormones at different stages of the cycle and this affects other parts of the reproductive system.

== Diseases related with endometrium ==
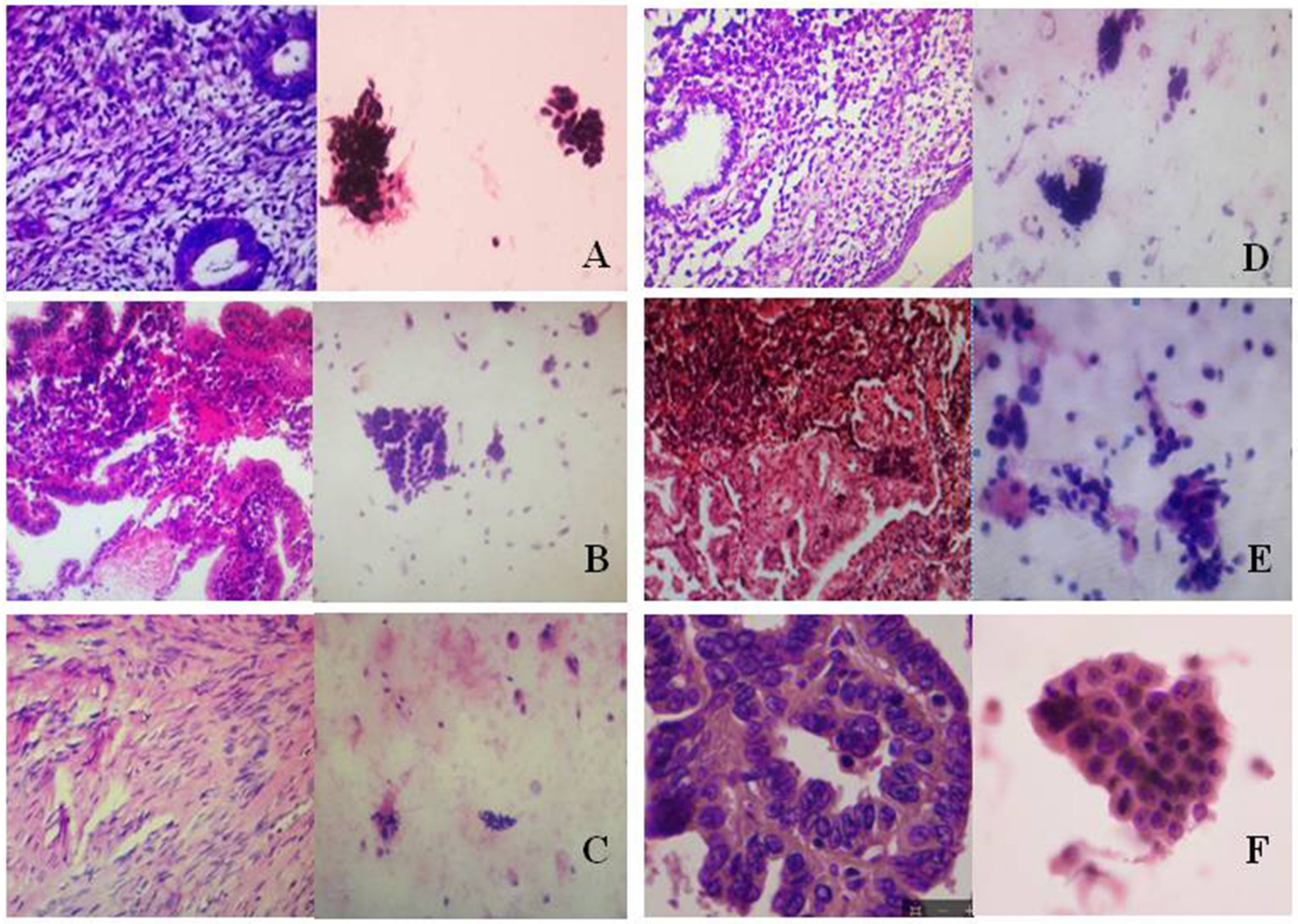
Histopathologic and cytopathologic images. (A) proliferative endometrium (Left: HE × 400) and proliferative endometrial cells (Right: HE × 100) (B) secretory endometrium (Left: HE × 10) and secretory endometrial cells (Right: HE × 10) (C) atrophic endometrium (Left: HE × 10) and atrophic endometrial cells (Right: HE × 10) (D) mixed endometrium (Left: HE × 10) and mixed endometrial cells (Right: HE × 10) (E): endometrial atypical hyperplasia (Left: HE × 10) and endometrial atypical cells (Right: HE × 200) (F) endometrial carcinoma (Left: HE × 400) and endometrial cancer cells (Right: HE × 400).

Chorionic tissue can result in marked endometrial changes, known as an Arias-Stella reaction, that have an appearance similar to cancer. Historically, this change was diagnosed as endometrial cancer and it is important only in so far as it should not be misdiagnosed as cancer.

- Adenomyosis is the growth of the endometrium into the muscle layer of the uterus (the myometrium).
- Endometriosis is the growth of tissue similar to the endometrium, outside the uterus.
- Endometrial hyperplasia
- Endometrial cancer is the most common cancer of the human female genital tract.
- Asherman's syndrome, also known as intrauterine adhesions, occurs when the basal layer of the endometrium is damaged by instrumentation (e.g., D&C) or infection (e.g., endometrial tuberculosis) resulting in endometrial sclerosis and adhesion formation partially or completely obliterating the uterine cavity.

Thin endometrium may be defined as an endometrial thickness of less than 8 mm. It usually occurs after menopause. Treatments that can improve endometrial thickness include Vitamin E, L-arginine and sildenafil citrate.

Gene expression profiling using cDNA microarray can be used for the diagnosis of endometrial disorders. The European Menopause and Andropause Society (EMAS) released Guidelines with detailed information to assess the endometrium.

=== Embryo transfer ===
An endometrial thickness (EMT) of less than 7 mm decreases the pregnancy rate in in vitro fertilization by an odds ratio of approximately 0.4 compared to an EMT of over 7 mm. However, such low thickness rarely occurs, and any routine use of this parameter is regarded as not justified. The optimal endometrial thickness is 10mm. Nevertheless, in human a perfect synchrony is not necessary; if the endometrium is not ready to receive the embryo an ectopic pregnancy may occur. This consist of the implantation of the blast outside the uterus, which can be extremely dangerous.

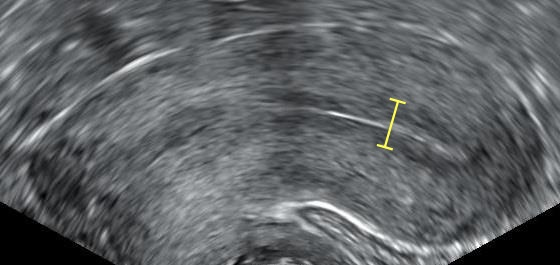
Triple-line endometrium measuring 7mm.

Observation of the endometrium by transvaginal ultrasonography is used when administering fertility medication, such as in in vitro fertilization. At the time of embryo transfer, it is favorable to have an endometrium of a thickness of between 7 and 14 mm with a triple-line configuration, which means that the endometrium contains a hyperechoic (usually displayed as light) line in the middle surrounded by two more hypoechoic (darker) lines. A triple-line endometrium reflects the separation of the basal layer and the functional layer, and is also observed in the periovulatory period secondary to rising estradiol levels, and disappears after ovulation.

Endometrial thickness is also associated with live births in IVF. The live birth rate in a normal endometrium is halved when the thickness is <5mm.

== Endometrial protection ==
Estrogens stimulate endometrial proliferation and carcinogenesis. Conversely, progestogens inhibit endometrial proliferation and carcinogenesis caused by estrogens and stimulate differentiation of the endometrium into decidua, which is termed endometrial transformation or decidualization. This is mediated by the progestogenic and functional antiestrogenic effects of progestogens in this tissue. These effects of progestogens and their protection against endometrial hyperplasia and endometrial cancer caused by estrogens is referred to as endometrial protection. As a result of endometrial protection, endometrial cells can undergo epithelial-mesenchymal transition and be detected in menstrual fluid.

== Endometrial receptivity ==
Endometrial receptivity is a crucial factor in achieving successful embryo implantation in assisted reproduction treatments. It refers to the ability of the endometrium to accept an embryo during a specific time window, known as the "implantation window". The synchronization between endometrial development and the embryo is essential to ensure a successful pregnancy.

Currently, there are three main tests that help evaluate endometrial receptivity and optimize fertility treatments:

ERA (Endometrial Receptivity Analysis):

This genetic test analyzes the expression of specific genes in the endometrium to identify whether it is in a receptive, pre-receptive or post-receptive phase, allowing the ideal moment for embryo transfer to be personalized.

EMMA (Endometrial Microbiome Metagenomic Analysis) and ALICE (Analysis of Infectious Chronic Endometritis):

Perform a test on the intrauterine microflora, using a small sample of the endometrium, in order to determine the presence of microorganisms that may promote or harm embryo implantation.

== Additional images ==
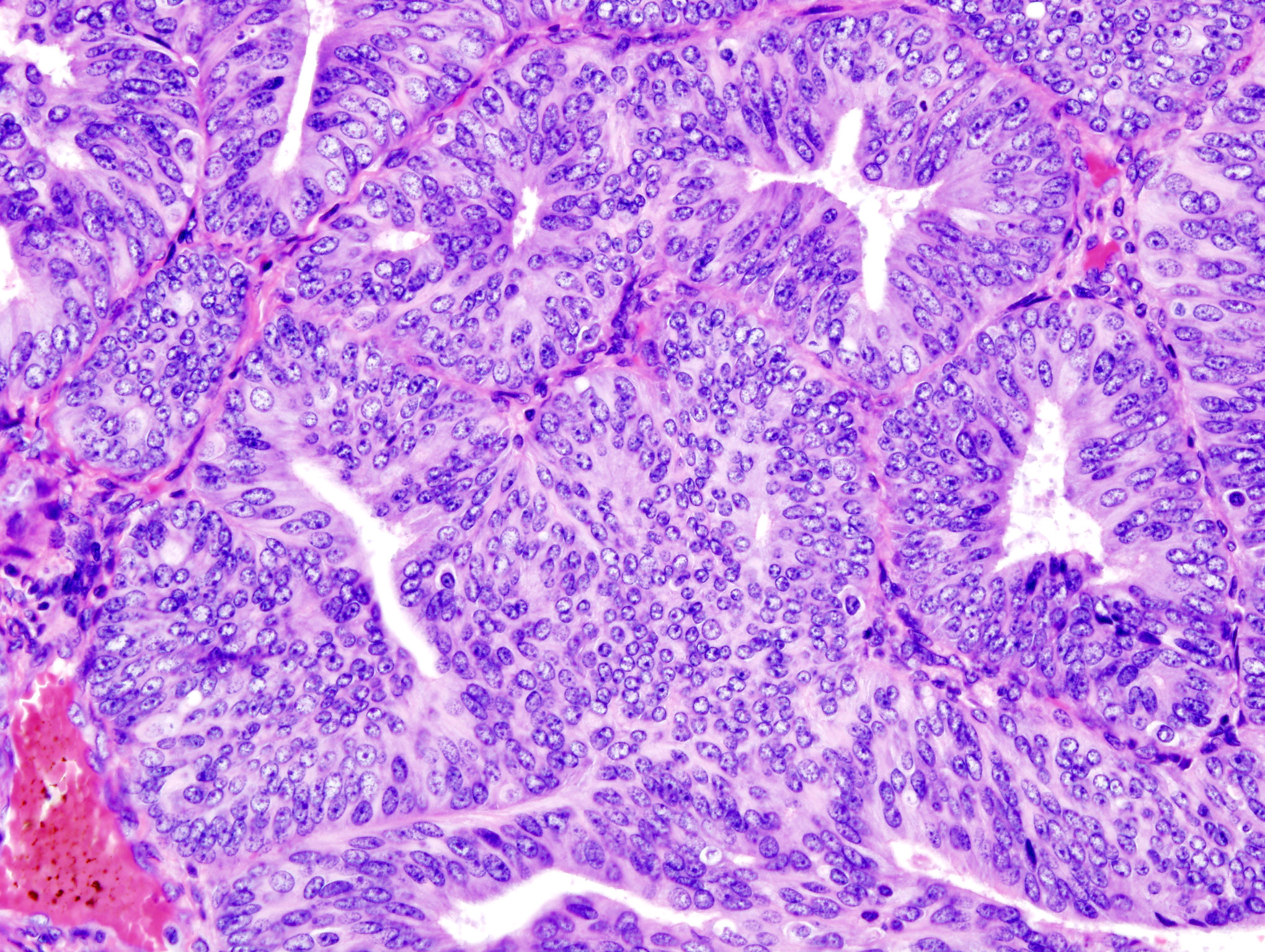
Endometrioid adenocarcinoma from biopsy. H&E stain.

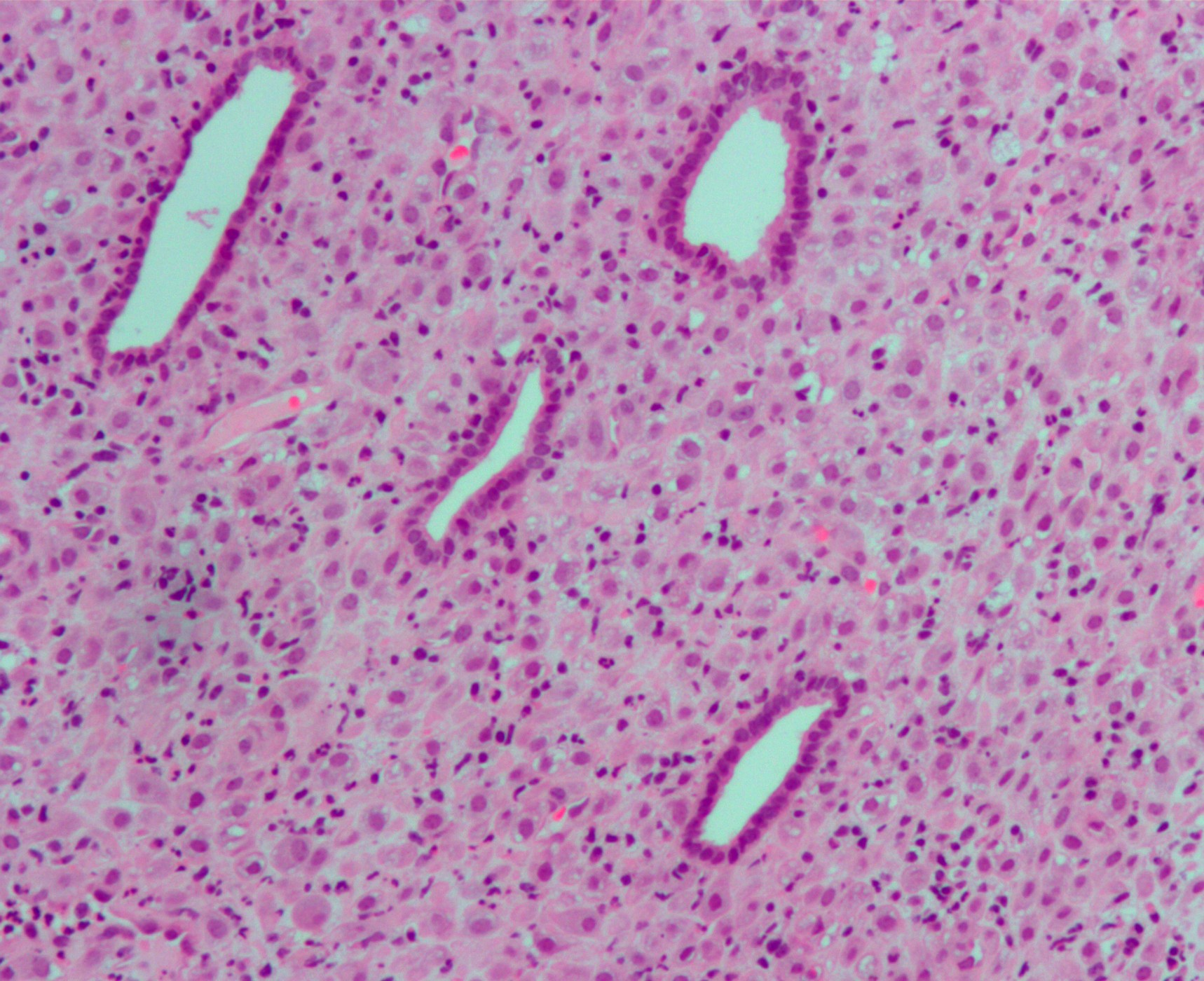
Micrograph of decidualized endometrium due to exogenous progesterone. H&E stain.

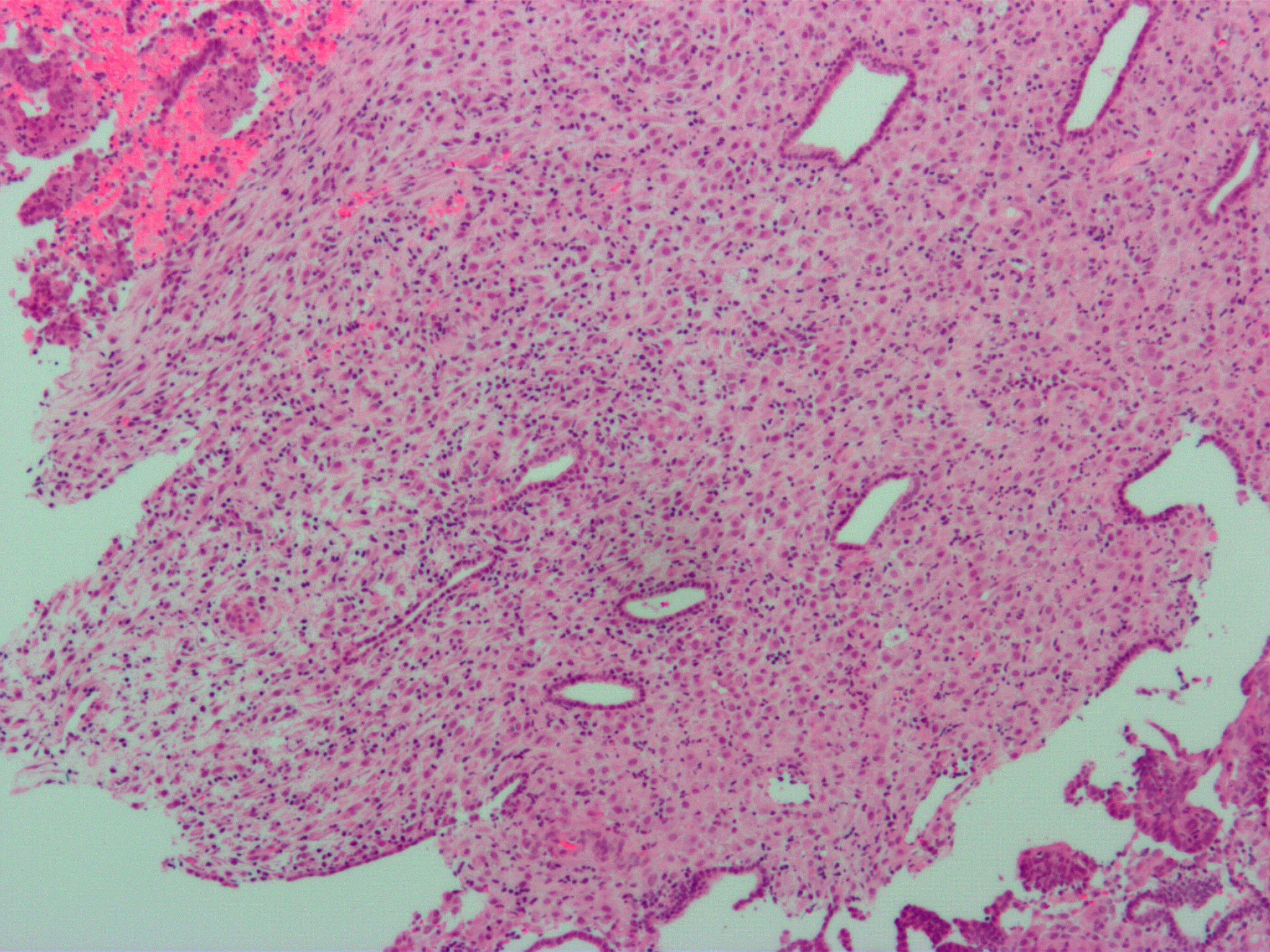
Micrograph of decidualized endometrium due to exogenous progesterone. H&E stain.

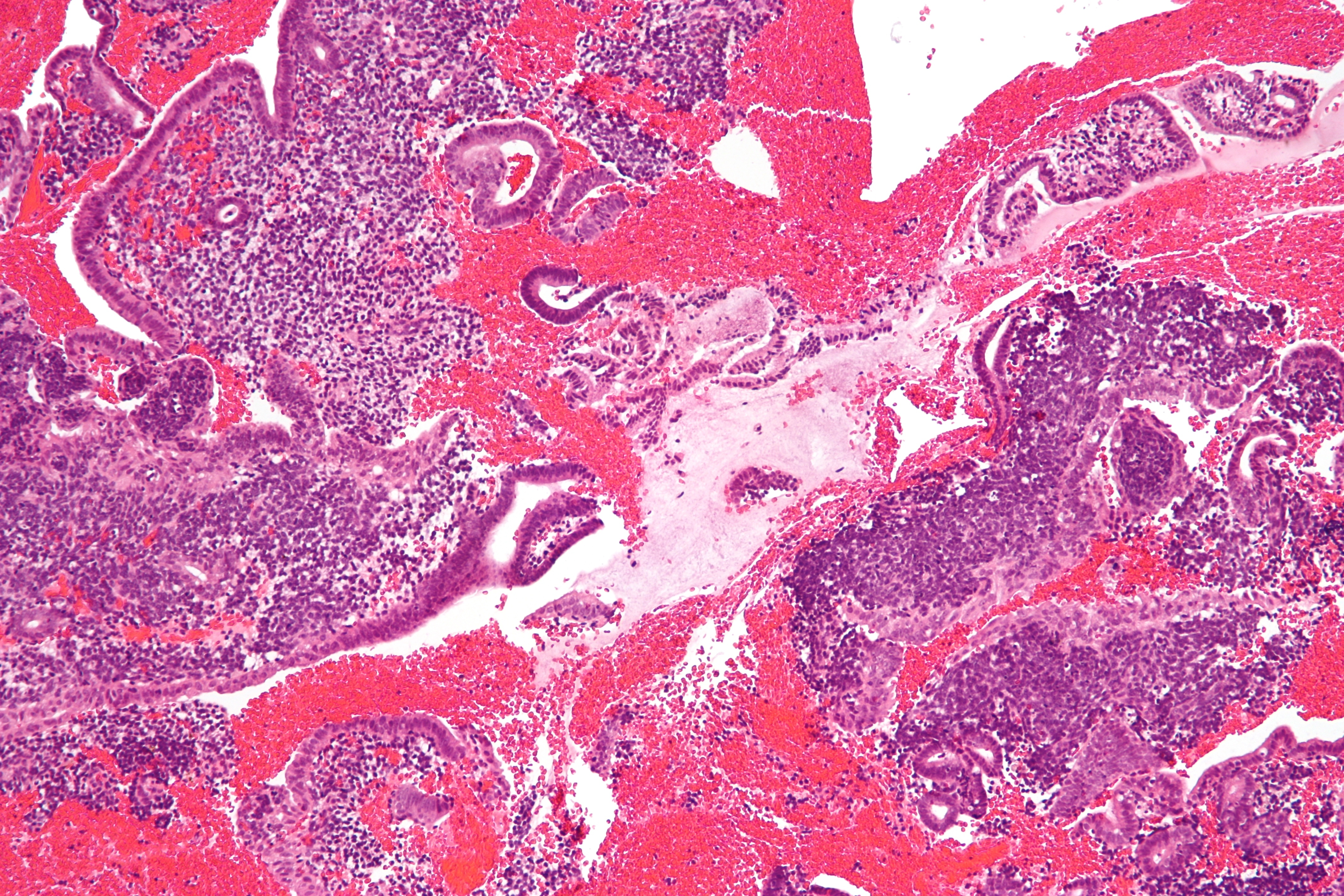
Micrograph showing endometrial stromal condensation, a finding seen in menses.

== See also ==
- CYTL1, also known as cytokine-like protein 1.
- Endometrial ablation
- List of distinct cell types in the adult human body
