= Decidua =

Part of uterus modified in pregnancy

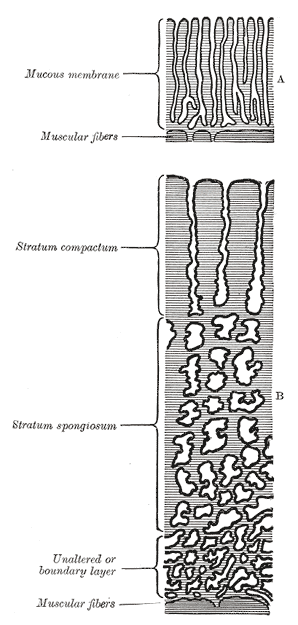
- Diagrammatic sections of the uterine mucous membrane: A. The non-pregnant uterus. B. Decidua parietalis; the mucous membrane in the pregnant uterus and not beneath the placenta.

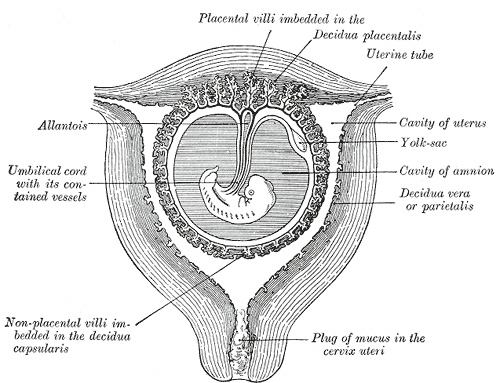
- Sectional plan of the gravid uterus in the third and fourth month

Identifiers
- MeSH: D003656
- TE: E6.0.1.4.0.0.7
- FMA: 85538

The decidua is the modified mucosal lining of the uterus (that is, modified endometrium) that forms every month, in preparation for pregnancy. It is shed off each month when there is no fertilized egg to support. The decidua is under the influence of progesterone. Endometrial cells become highly characteristic. The decidua forms the maternal part of the placenta and remains for the duration of the pregnancy. After birth the decidua is shed together with the placenta.

== Structure ==
The part of the decidua that interacts with the trophoblast is the decidua basalis (also called decidua placentalis), while the decidua capsularis grows over the embryo on the luminal side, enclosing it into the endometrium. The remainder of the decidua is termed the decidua parietalis or decidua vera, and it will fuse with the decidua capsularis by the fourth month of gestation.

Three morphologically distinct layers of the decidua basalis can then be described:

- Compact outer layer (stratum compactum, zona compacta)
- Intermediate layer (stratum spongiosum, zona spongiosa)
- Boundary layer adjacent to the myometrium (stratum basalis)

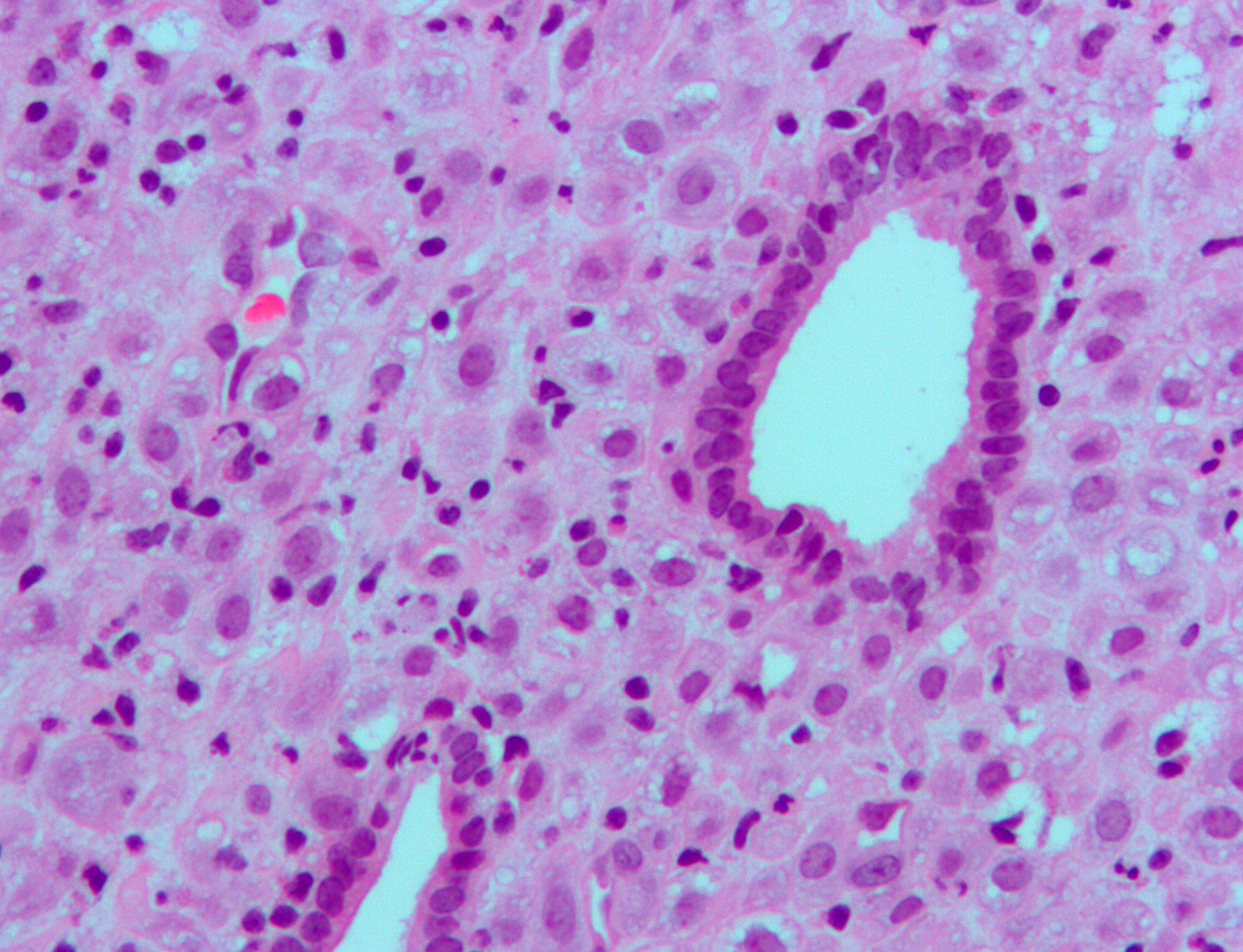
Micrograph of decidualized endometrium due to exogenous progesterone. H&E stain.

The decidua has a histologically-distinct appearance, displaying large polygonal decidual cells in the stroma. These are enlarged endometrial stromal cells, which resemble epithelium (and are referred to as "epithelioid").

Decidualization includes the process of differentiation of the spindle-shape stromal fibroblasts into the plump secretory decidual cells, which create a pericellular extracellular matrix rich in fibronectin and laminin (similar to epithelial cells).

Vascularity, as well as vascular permeability, is enhanced in the decidualizing endometrium.

Its leukocyte population is distinct, with the presence of large endometrial granular leukocytes being predominant, while polynuclear leukocytes and B cells are scant.

The large granular lymphocytes (CD56 bright) are called uterine natural killer cells (uNK cells).

== Development ==
After ovulation, in placental mammals, the endometrial lining becomes hypertrophic and vascular under the influence of the sex hormones, estrogen and progesterone.

In animals exhibiting hemochorial placentation, the endometrium undergoes decidualization following implantation. If implantation does not occur, the secretory lining will be absorbed (estrous cycle) or shed (menstrual cycle).

The decidua is shed with the placenta during birth.

== Function ==
As the maternal interface to the embryo the decidua participates in the exchanges of nutrition, gas, and waste with the gestation. It also protects the pregnancy from the maternal immune system. Further, the decidua has to allow a very controlled invasion of the trophoblast.

In invasive placental disorders like placenta accreta decidualization have been consistently found to be deficient.

=== Hormone production ===
The decidua secretes hormones, growth factors, and cytokines. It has receptors for estrogen, progesterone, growth hormone, and others.

Among its products are hormones commonly associated with other organs such as cortisol, CRF, GnRH, prolactin, and relaxin. Decidual prolactin is not under dopaminergic control.

Insulin-like growth factor-binding protein 1 (IGFBP1) also called placental protein 12, and PAEP (glycodelin) appear to be specific products of the secretory and decidual lining.

Other factors released include interleukin-15 and vascular endothelial growth factor (VEGF). A reasonable understanding of the role and interplay of these hormones and factors has not been evolved.

=== Other ===
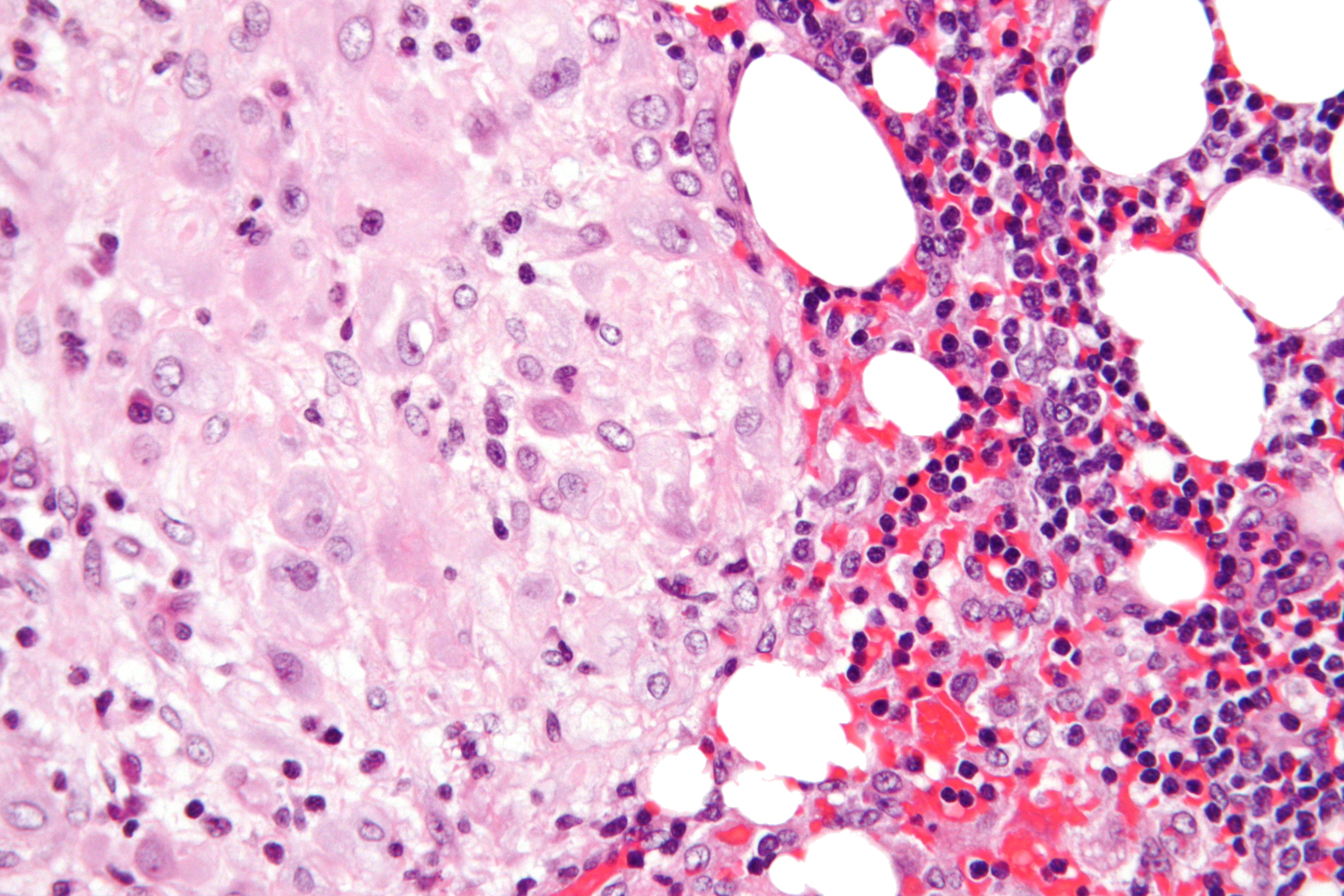
Micrograph of decidua in a lymph node. H&E stain.

- In case of an ectopic pregnancy, the endometrium nevertheless becomes decidualized. A woman may shed the lining in the form of a decidual cast, which may be mistaken as a miscarriage, when, in fact, the ectopic pregnancy still persists.
- A decidual reaction can be observed in tissue of the peritoneum and ovary during a pregnancy, and represents a response of stromal tissue to progesterone.
- Decidua in a lymph node may mimic metastatic carcinoma.

== Clinical significance ==
A long-lasting infection of the decidua, chronic deciduitis, is associated with pre-term labour.

Within the decidua, occasional fibrinoid deposits form where the syncytiotrophoblast is damaged. The region of fibrinoid deposition where trophoblasts meet the compact portion of the decidua basalis is called Rohr's layer, while the fibrinoid deposits that occur between the compact and spongy layer of the decidua basalis are termed Nitabuch's layer (for Raissa Nitabuch). This layer is absent in placenta accreta.

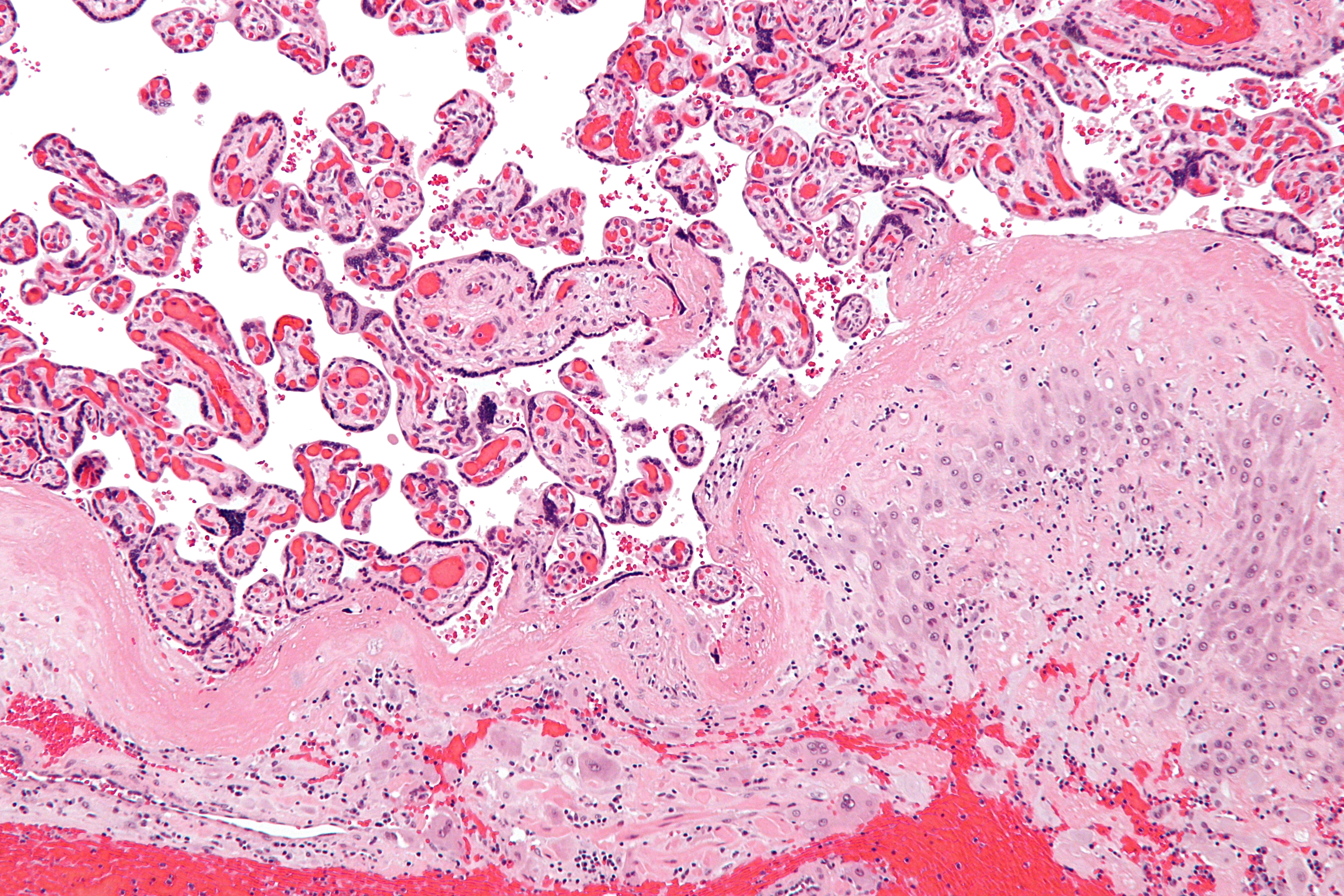
Micrograph of chronic deciduitis. H&E stain.

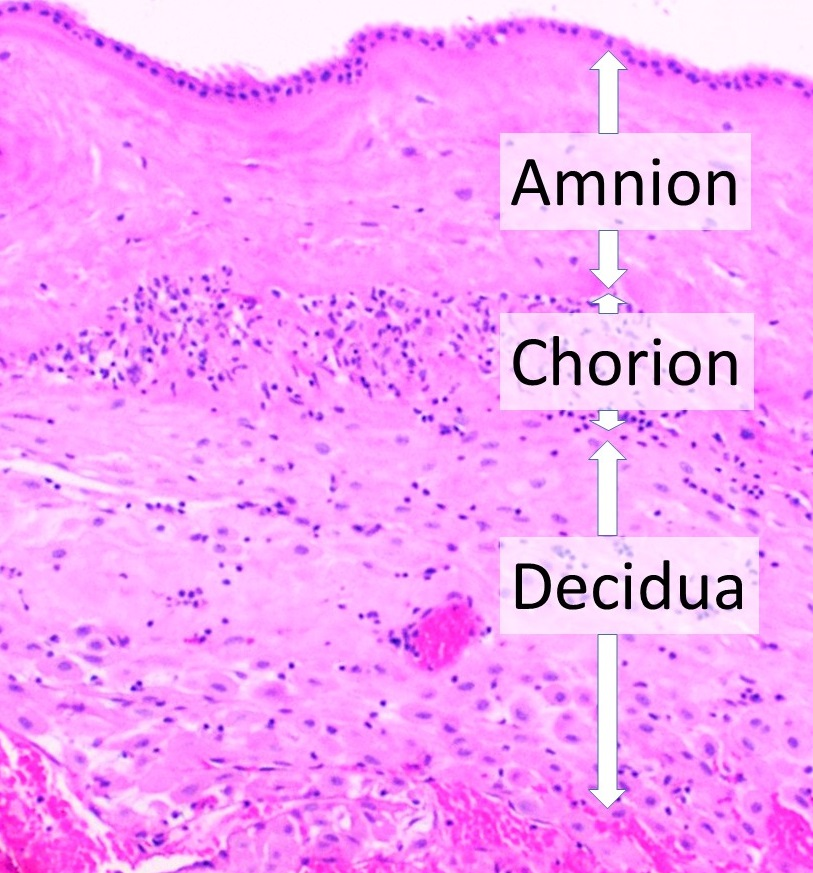
Acute choriodeciduitis, with neutrophils seen in the chorion and decidua.

== Etymology ==
The word comes from Latin deciduus 'falling off / shedding'.

== Additional images ==
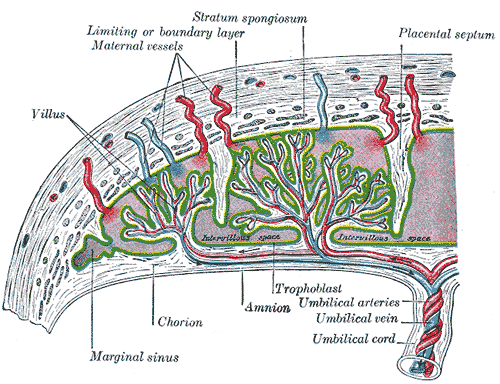
Scheme of placental circulation.

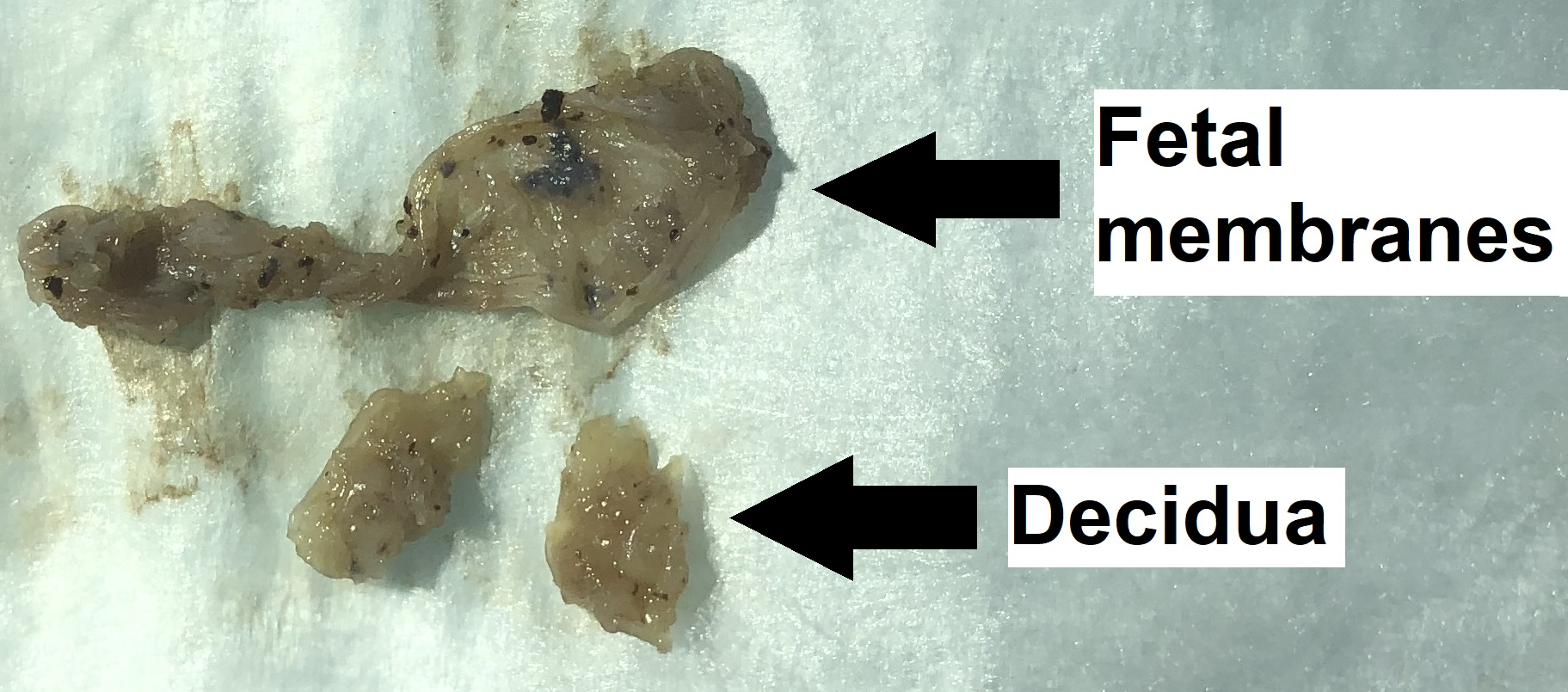
Gross pathology of fetal membranes versus decidua
