= Implantation (embryology) =

First stage of pregnancy

- Implantation as one of the early stages of human embryonic development

Details
- Carnegie stage: 3
- Days: 5–9
- Gives rise to: Gastrula

Implantation, also known as nidation, is the stage in the embryonic development of mammals in which the blastocyst hatches, attaches, adheres, and invades into the endometrium of the female's uterus. Implantation is the first stage of gestation, and, when successful, the female is considered to be pregnant. An implanted embryo is detected by the presence of increased levels of human chorionic gonadotropin (hCG) in a pregnancy test. The implanted embryo will receive oxygen and nutrients from the placenta in order to grow.

For implantation to take place the uterus must become receptive. Uterine receptivity involves much cross-talk between the embryo and the uterus, initiating changes to the endometrium. This stage gives a synchrony that opens a window of implantation that enables successful implantation of a viable embryo. The endocannabinoid system plays a vital role in this synchrony in the uterus, influencing uterine receptivity, and embryo implantation. The embryo expresses cannabinoid receptors early in its development that are responsive to anandamide (AEA) secreted in the uterus. AEA is produced at higher levels before implantation and is then down-regulated at the time of implantation. This signaling is of importance in the embryo-uterus crosstalk in regulating the timing of embryonic implantation and uterine receptivity. Adequate concentrations of AEA that are neither too high or too low, are needed for successful implantation.

There is an extensive variation in the type of trophoblast cells, and structures of the placenta across the different species of mammals. Of the five recognised stages of implantation including two pre-implantation stages that precede placentation, the first four are similar across the species. The five stages are migration and hatching, pre-contact, attachment, adhesion, and invasion. In humans, following the stage of hatching that takes place around four to five days after fertilization, the process of implantation begins. By the end of the first week, the blastocyst is superficially attached to the uterine endometrium. By the end of the second week, implantation has completed.

== Implantation stages ==
There are five recognized stages of implantation in mammals, including two pre-implantation stages that precede the formation of the placenta. They are: migration and hatching, pre-contact, attachment, adhesion, and invasion. The first four stages are similar across the species with the process of invasion being variable. These three stages of apposition, attachment, and invasion are also alternatively termed contact (apposition), adhesion (attachment), and penetration (invasion), and can only take place during a limited timeframe known as the window of implantation when the uterus is at its most receptive.

=== Migration and hatching ===
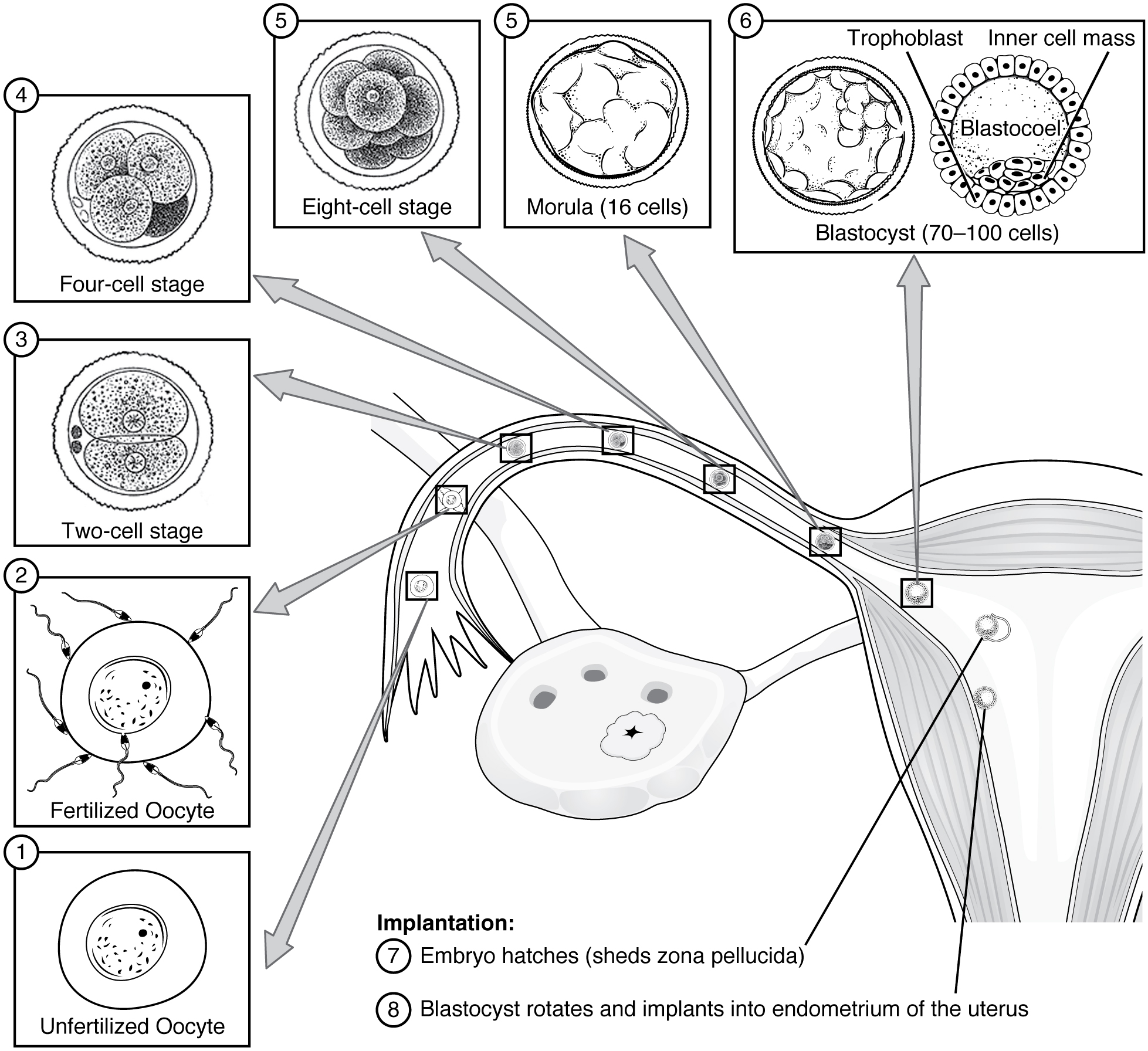
Diagram of stages of developing blastocyst in the human until implantation

There are two stages of migration involved in implantation: the first is the migration of the zygote, and the second is the migration of the trophoblast. Fertilization of the oocyte takes place in the ampulla of the fallopian tube. Cilia on the lining of the tube move the zygote in its migration towards the uterus.

During this migration the zygote undergoes a number of cell divisions that creates a ball of 16 compacted blastomeres called a morula. The morula enters the uterus after three or four days, and as it does a cavity called the blastocoel is formed in the morula to produce the blastocyst. The blastocyst contains the inner cell mass that will go on to develop into the embryo proper, and an outer cell layer of trophoblasts that will develop into the extraembryonic membranes (fetal membranes).

The blastocyst is still enclosed in the egg-coat known as the zona pellucida, and to be able to implant into the uterine wall it must rid itself of this covering. This stage is known as zona hatching, and when there is sufficient dissolution the blastocyst is able to initiate the apposition stage of implantation. Lytic factors in the uterine cavity, as well as factors from the blastocyst itself are essential for the breakdown of the egg-coat. Mechanisms in the latter are indicated by the fact that the zona pellucida remains intact if an unfertilized egg is placed in the uterus under the same conditions.

Among the known molecular regulators that promote hatching are predominantly proteases that are stimulated by various growth factors. The blastocyst also produces cytokines, both pro-inflammatory and anti-inflammatory, that have crucial roles during implantation and other stages of pregnancy. Both types of cytokines modulate the activity of proteases, including MMPs, plasminogen activators, and cathepsins. It is unknown whether the cytokines involved in hatching are pro-inflammatory or anti-inflammatory, or which proteases are involved. However, it is well accepted that the pro-inflammatory cytokines are dominant during implantation. Cytokines are also present in the uterine milk which might regulate the development and function of the blastocyst but there is no evidence to support their involvement in hatching. Leukemia inhibitory factor (LIF) is a pro-inflammatory cytokine expressed in the endometrium during the luteal phase of the menstrual cycle, with the highest expression seen during the window of implantation. LIF plays a role in adhesion and invasion.

Assisted zona hatching may take place in assisted reproduction, where the zona pellucida may be artificially pierced to facilitate hatching.

=== Apposition ===
Following zona hatching, the very first loose connection or contact between the blastocyst and the endometrium is called apposition. Apposition is usually made where there is a small crypt in the endometrium, and also where there has been enough breakdown of the zona pellucida to allow the blastocyst trophoblast to directly contact the underlying endometrium. Ultimately, the inner cell mass (also embryoblast), inside the trophoblast layer, is aligned closest to the decidua. If the inner cell mass is not aligned with the decidua at apposition, it has the ability to freely rotate within the trophoblast and achieve this alignment. Apposition is only a weak interaction of the trophectoderm with the uterine epithelium that is unstable to shear stress. Apposition is also reversible allowing repositioning of the blastocyst in the uterus.

=== Adhesion ===
Adhesion is a much stronger attachment to the endometrium than the loose apposition. The trophoblasts adhere by penetrating the endometrium, with protrusions of trophoblast cells.

This adhering activity is by microvilli that are on the trophoblast. The trophoblast have binding fiber connections, laminin, collagen type IV, and integrins that assist in this adhesion process.

Mucin-16 is a transmembrane mucin expressed at the apical surface of uterine epithelia. This mucin prevents the blastocyst from implanting in an undesired located on the epithelium. Thus, MUC-16 inhibits cell-cell adhesion. Its removal during pinopode formation has been shown to facilitate trophoblast invasion in vitro.

The identity of the molecules on the trophoblast and the endometrial epithelia that mediate the initial interaction between the two remain unidentified. However, a number of research groups have proposed that MUC1, a member of the mucin family of glycosylated proteins, is involved. MUC1 is a transmembrane glycoprotein expressed at the apical surface of endometrial epithelial cells during the window of implantation in humans and has been shown to be differentially expressed between fertile and infertile subjects during this time. MUC1 displays carbohydrate moieties on its extracellular domain that are ligands of L-selectin, a cell adhesion molecule on the surface of trophoblast cells. An in vitro model of implantation gave evidence to support the hypothesis that L-selectin mediates apposition of the blastocyst to the uterine epithelium by interacting with its ligands.

=== Invasion ===
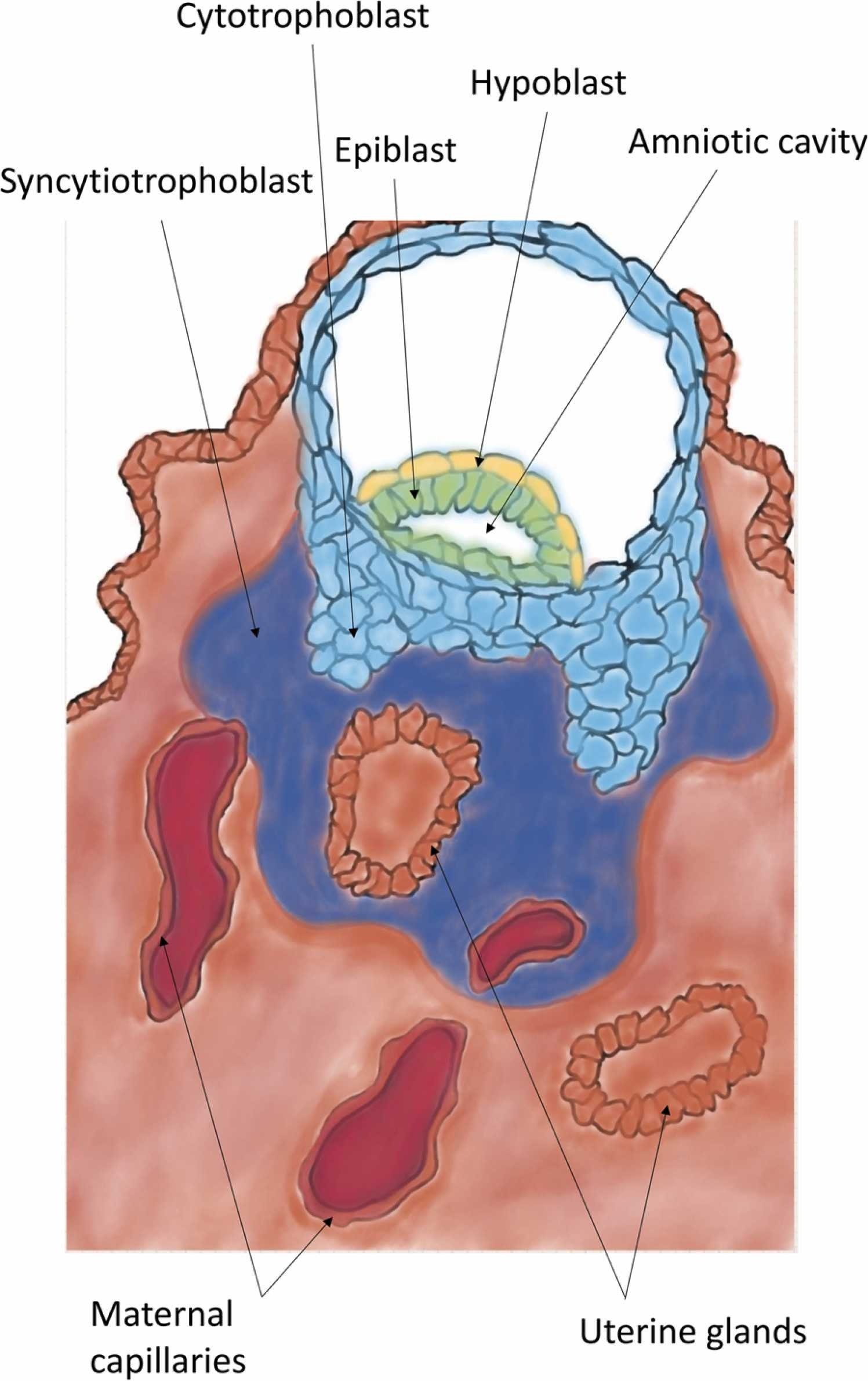
Illustration of an implanting embryo

Invasion is the further establishment of the blastocyst into the endometrium. The protrusions of trophoblast cells that adhere into the endometrium continue to proliferate and penetrate into the endometrium using gelatinases A (MMP-2), and B (MMP-9). Trophoblasts invade the uterus attempting to reach maternal blood supply, for setting up the foundation for fetal blood flow. They also secrete preimplantation factor, a peptide that helps their invasion and placenta formation. As these trophoblasts penetrate, they fuse with their neighbours, terminally differentiating into a multinucleated tissue, a syncytium known as the syncytiotrophoblast. Between this layer and the blastocyst lies the cytotrophoblast.

When the syncytiotrophoblast reaches the basal membrane beneath the decidual cells, it dislodges them to further invade into the uterine stroma. Dislodging is accomplished by degrading the cell adhesion molecules (CAMs) that link the decidual cells, and the associated extracellular matrix. Degradation is achieved by the secretion of tumor necrosis factor-alpha from the syncytiotrophoblast, which inhibits the expression of CAMs and beta-catenin. The extracellular matrix is degraded by metalloproteinases such as collagenases, gelatinases and matrix metalloproteinases, and by serine proteases. The collagenases digest types I, II, III, VII and X collagen. The gelatinases exist in two forms; one digesting Type-IV collagen and one digesting gelatin. The extracellular matrix is degraded by serine endopeptidases and metalloproteinases. The syncytiotrophoblast can then invade into the endometrium taking the embryo with it where it becomes embedded. Eventually, the syncytiotrophoblast comes into contact with maternal blood and forms chorionic villi – the beginning of placentation. Following invasion, the breach in the uterine epithelium made by the blastocyst's entry is sealed by a fibrin plug. The fibrin plug is a coagulation of a blood clot and cellular debris.

==== Extravillous trophoblasts ====
Extravillous trophoblasts are cells from the invading villi that migrate into the myometrium of the mother's uterus. These cells remodel the spiral arteries to improve and secure maternal blood flow to the growing embryo. There is also evidence that this process occurs with the uterine veins, stabilizing them to improve drainage of fetal blood and metabolic wastes. Trophoblasts have also been documented to migrate into various tissues in the mother. Due to this, trophoblasts have been implicated in a phenomenon known as fetomaternal microchimerism where fetal cells establish cell lines in maternal tissues.

==== Secretions ====
Pre-implantation blastocysts have been shown to be capable of secreting growth factors, hormones and trypsin-like proteases to participate in the hatching process.

During invasion the blastocyst secretes factors for a multitude of purposes. It secretes several autocrine factors, targeting itself and stimulating it to further invade the endometrium. Human chorionic gonadotropin (hCG) is an autocrine growth factor for the blastocyst, while insulin-like growth factor 2, stimulates its invasiveness. Human chorionic gonadotropin not only acts as an immunosuppressive, but also signals to the mother that she is pregnant, preventing luteolysis of the corpus luteum and menstruation by sustaining the function of the corpus luteum. Secretions loosen decidual cells from each other, prevent the embryo from being rejected by the mother, trigger the final decidualization and prevent menstruation. Preimplantation factor is secreted by trophoblast cells ahead of placenta formation.

===== Immunosuppressive =====
The embryo differs from the cells of the mother, and would be rejected as a parasite by the immune system of the mother if it did not secrete, immunosuppressive agents. Such agents include platelet-activating factor, human chorionic gonadotropin, early pregnancy factor, prostaglandin E2, interleukin-1 alpha, interleukin 6, interferon-alpha, leukemia inhibitory factor and colony-stimulating factor.

===== Other factors =====
Other factors secreted by the blastocyst are;

- Embryo-derived histamine-releasing factor
- Tissue plasminogen activator as well as its inhibitors
- Estradiol
- β1-integrins
- Fibroblast growth factor
- Transforming growth factor alpha
- Inhibin

== Uterus receptivity ==
To enable implantation, the uterus goes through changes in order to be able to receive the conceptus. Receptivity includes changes to endometrial cells in the formation of pinopodes that help to absorb uterine fluid; changes in the thickness of the endometrium and its blood supply development, and the formation of the decidua. Collectively these changes are known as plasma membrane transformation, and bring the blastocyst nearer to the endometrium and immobilize it. During this stage the blastocyst can still be eliminated by being flushed out of the uterus.

Successful implantation is co-dependent on the viability of the embryo, and the receptivity of the uterus. A critical involved factor is the developmental synchrony between the embryo and the uterus. The synchrony gives a short period of receptivity known as the window of implantation, and involves much crosstalk between the blastocyst and the endometrium at this stage.

The endocannabinoid system plays a vital role in this synchrony in the uterus, influencing uterine receptivity, and embryo implantation. The embryo expresses cannabinoid receptors early in its development that are responsive to anandamide (AEA) secreted in the uterus. This signaling is of importance in the embryo-uterus crosstalk in regulating the timing of embryonic implantation and uterine receptivity. Adequate concentrations of AEA that are neither too high or too low, are needed for successful implantation. IL-6 and FAAH are both crucial for uterine receptivity and together with AEA there is seen to be a link with adequate endometrial thickness that sustains pregnancy.

During adhesion the cross-talk is conveyed by receptor-ligand-interactions, both integrin-matrix and proteoglycan ones. Proteoglycan receptors are found on the surface of the decidua, and their counterparts, the proteoglycans, are found around the trophoblast cells of the blastocyst. This ligand-receptor system is also present just at the implantation window. The blastocyst signals to the endometrium to adapt further to its presence, for example by changes in the cytoskeleton of decidual cells. This, in turn, dislodges the decidual cells from their connection to the underlying basal lamina, which enables the blastocyst to perform the succeeding invasion.

=== Window of implantation ===
The window of implantation is a limited timeframe for the successful attachment of the blastocyst. In humans uterine receptivity is optimum on days 20-24 of the secretory phase of the menstrual cycle when luteinizing hormone levels are at their peak. The crosstalk between the embryo and the endometrium takes place during this time. The endothelial epithelial cells lining the uterus are the first cells to detect signals from the blastocyst, and they are transduced into downstream signalling pathways. In humans the window of implantation is only available for 24–36 hours.

The endometrial microbiome has been indicated as having an important role in successful implantation in controlling endometrial cell function, and the function of the local immunity system that prevents pathogen growth. This is associated with the secretion of protective substances.

==== Pinopodes ====
Pinopodes are formed at the beginning of the window of implantation, and are found in many species. They are mushroom-like protrusions from the apical cell membrane of uterine epithelial cells. Pinopodes are formed by the swelling of these epithelial cells, and the fusing together of a number of microvilli, to reach a maximum size. They appear between day 19 and day 21 of gestational age, and are fully formed at day 20. This corresponds to a fertilization age of approximately five to seven days, which corresponds well with the time of implantation. Pinopodes only persist for a maximum of two days, and are seen as the ultrastructural markers of receptivity.

Their development is enhanced by progesterone, and inhibited by estrogens. During the window of implantation, cell to cell adhesion is inhibited by MUC1 a cell surface glycoprotein, belonging to the glycocalyx. The pinopodes are taller than the microvilli and protrude through the glycocalyx enabling direct contact with the adhering trophoblast. The most important attribute of pinopodes is this removal of glycoproteins from the cell surfaces of the uterine epithelial cells. MUC16 has also been shown to disappear from the cell surfaces with the development of the pinopodes. Some studies have reported that pinopodes entrap cilia, which prevents embryo movement, and during implantation allows close contact and adherence of the embryo.

Pinopodes bring uterine fluid and its macromolecules into the cells by the process of endocytosis. This decreases the volume of the uterus, taking the walls closer to the blastocyst floating in it. Thus, the period of active pinopodes might limit the implantation window. Pinopodes continue to absorb fluid, removing most of it during the early stages of implantation.

=== Predecidualization ===
The endometrium becomes thickened, and vascularized, and its glands grow to be tortuous and their secretions are boosted. These changes reach their maximum about seven days after ovulation.

Furthermore, the surface of the endometrium produces a kind of rounded cells, which cover the whole area toward the uterine cavity. This happens about 9 to 10 days after ovulation. These cells are called decidual cells, which emphasises that the whole layer of them is shed off in every menstruation if no pregnancy occurs, just as leaves of deciduous trees. The uterine glands, on the other hand, decrease in activity and degenerate around 8 to 9 days after ovulation in absence of pregnancy.

The decidual cells originate from the stromal cells that are always present in the endometrium, and make up a new layer, the decidua. The rest of the endometrium, in addition, expresses differences between the luminal and the basal sides. The luminal cells form the stratum compactum of the decidua, in contrast to the basalolateral stratum spongiosum, which consists of the rather spongy stromal cells.

=== Decidualization ===
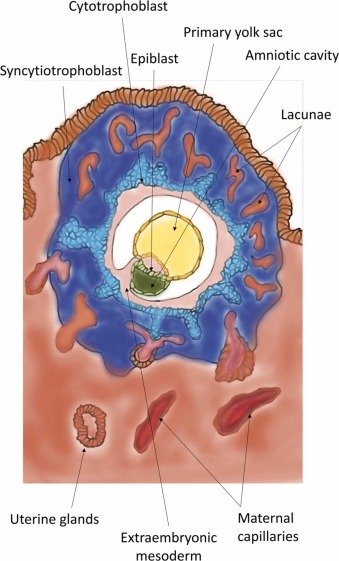
Early formation of placenta

Decidualization expands if pregnancy occurs, further developing the uterine glands, the stratum compactum, and the epithelium of decidual cells lining it. The decidual cells become filled with lipids and glycogen and take the polyhedral shape characteristic of decidual cells. Factors from the blastocyst also trigger the final formation of decidual cells into their proper form. In contrast, some decidual cells in the proximity of the blastocyst degenerate, providing nutrients for it. An indication of embryonic influence is that decidualization occurs at a higher degree in conception cycles than in nonconception cycles. Furthermore, similar changes are observed when giving stimuli mimicking the natural invasion of the embryo.

The embryo releases serine proteases which causes the epithelial cell membrane to depolarize and activates the epithelial sodium channel. This triggers an influx of calcium ions (Ca^{2+}) and phosphorylation of CREB. Phosphorylation of CREB upregulates the expression of COX2, which leads to the release of prostaglandin E2 (PGE2) from epithelial cells. PGE2 acts on the stroma cells activating cAMP-related pathways in stromal cell leading to decidualization.

==== Parts of decidua ====
The decidua can be organized into separate sections, although they have the same composition.

- Decidua basalis – This is the part of the decidua which is located basalolateral to the embryo after implantation.
- Decidua capsularis – Decidua capsularis grows over the embryo on the luminal side, enclosing it into the endometrium. It surrounds the embryo together with decidua basalis.
- Decidua parietalis – All other decidua on the uterine surface belongs to decidua parietalis.

=== Decidua throughout pregnancy ===
After implantation the decidua remains, at least through the first trimester. However, its most prominent time is during the early stages of pregnancy, during implantation. Its function as a surrounding tissue is replaced by the definitive placenta. However, some elements of the decidualization remain throughout pregnancy.

The compacta and spongiosa layers are still observable beneath the decidua in pregnancy. The glands of the spongiosa layer continue to secrete during the first trimester, when they degenerate. However, before that disappearance, some glands secrete unequally much. This phenomenon of hypersecretion is called the Arias-Stella phenomenon, after the pathologist Javier Arias-Stella.

== Uterine glands ==
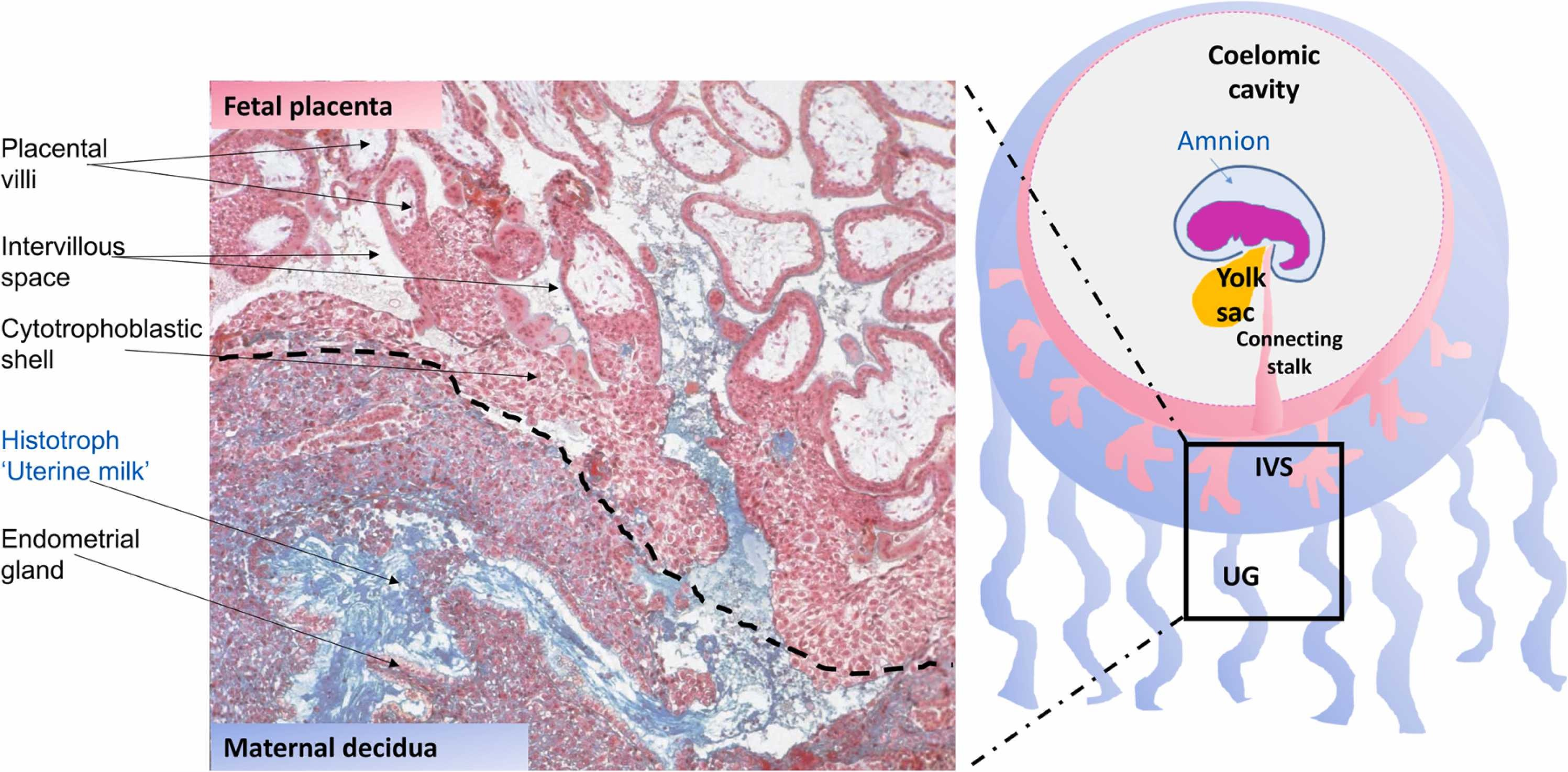
Fetal-maternal interface showing uterine milk

Proteins, glycoproteins and peptides

secreted by the uterine glands

Matrix-associated:
Fibronectin
Laminin
Entactin
Type-IV collagen
Heparan sulfate
Proteoglycan
Integrins
–
Others:
Mucins
Prolactin
IGFBP-1
Glycodelin
Endometrial protein 15
Albumin
Beta-Lipoprotein
Relaxin
Fibroblast growth factor 1
Fibroblast growth factor 2
Pappalysin-1
Stress response protein 27 (SRP-27)
CA-125
Beta-endorphin
Leu-enkephalin
Diamine oxidase
Tissue plasminogen activator
Renin
Progesterone-dependent carbonic anhydrase
Lactoferrin

Not only the lining of the uterus transforms, but the secretion from its glands changes. This change is induced by increased levels of progesterone from the corpus luteum.

=== Nourishment ===
The embryo spends approximately 72 hours in the uterine cavity before implanting. In that time, it cannot receive nourishment directly from the blood of the mother, and must rely on secreted nutrients into the uterine cavity, e.g. iron and fat-soluble vitamins.

=== Growth and implantation ===
In addition to nourishment, the endometrium secretes several steroid-dependent proteins, important for growth and implantation. Cholesterol, and steroids are also secreted. Implantation is further facilitated by synthesis of matrix substances, adhesion molecules and surface receptors for the matrix substances.

== Clinical significance ==
=== Implantation failure ===
Reproduction in humans is not very efficient. Only around 30% of natural conceptions result in successful pregnancies. Of the failed pregnancies around 85% are due to implantation failure. Implantation failure is considered to be caused by inadequate uterine receptivity in two-thirds of cases, and by problems with the embryo itself in the other third. Most IVF procedures fail because of implantation failure accounting for almost half of all pregnancy failures.

Inadequate uterine receptivity may be caused by abnormal cytokine and hormonal signaling as well as epigenetic alterations. Recurrent implantation failure is a cause of female infertility. Therefore, pregnancy rates can be improved by optimizing endometrial receptivity for implantation. Evaluation of implantation markers may help to predict pregnancy outcome and detect occult implantation deficiency. As part of the organ-on-a-chip program, an endometrium-on-a-chip has been developed to model the functioning of the endometrium that could more clearly identify causes of implantation failure. Organoids have also been developed to model the endometrium and its role in implantation.

In women with more than three implantation failures in assisted reproduction, a review of several small randomized controlled studies estimated that the use of adjunct low molecular weight heparin improves live birth rate by approximately 80%. Luteal phase support can include the use of progesterone and human chorionic gonadotropin (hCG) to improve the chances of a successful implantation.

=== Zinc deficiency ===
Zinc is crucial in pre-conception, (and successful pregnancy), and its deficiency can lead to incompetent blastocyst development. Once an egg is fertilized zinc is released in a zinc spark which promotes changes that include the hardening of the zona pellucida preventing polyspermy.

=== Implantation bleeding ===
Bleeding and spotting are common during the luteal phase of the menstrual cycle, and early stages of pregnancy, but are unrelated to implantation. Implantation bleeding occurs between 7 and 14 days after fertilization, and is a small amount of light vaginal bleeding or spotting that can occur in early pregnancy due to the blastocyst penetrating the lining of the uterus during implantation. By day 13 the penetration site in the endometrium has usually been closed by a fibrin plug but increased blood flow into the syncytiotrophoblast spaces can sometimes cause bleeding at that site. Implantation bleeding may be accompanied by symptoms such as cramping, nausea, breast tenderness, and headaches. Implantation bleeding can be distinguished from period bleeding by color, clotting, strength and duration of flow.

== See also ==
- Embryonic diapause
- Hofbauer cells
- Homeostatic capacity
- Reichert's membrane
