= Reichert's membrane =

Type of extraembryonic membrane

Reichert's membrane is an extraembryonic membrane that forms during early mammalian embryonic development. It forms as a thickened basement membrane to cover the embryo immediately following implantation to give protection to the embryo from the uterine pressures exerted. Reichert's membrane is also important for the maternofetal exchange of nutrients. The membrane collapses once the placenta has fully developed.

== Structure ==
Reichert's membrane is a multilayered, non-vascular, specialised thickened basement membrane that forms on the inner surface of the trophoblast around the time of implantation, and during the formation of the placenta. It is composed of an extracellular matrix that includes laminin, type IV collagen, and nidogen, and is secreted by embryonic cells in the distal parietal endoderm.

The synthesis of laminin 111 in the embryo contributes to the formation of Reichert's membrane.

== Function ==
Reichert's membrane functions as a buffer space between the embryo and the decidua. This space provides protection to the embryo from varying uterine pressures exerted by smooth muscle contractions of the myometrium. During post gastrulation Reichert's membrane is necessary for the maternofetal exchange of nutrients. Reichert's membrane encloses the embryo until the amnion develops, and when the placenta is fully developed the membrane collapses.

A major difference in the early formation of the mouse embryo, and that of the human embryo is that in the mouse following implantation the epiblast takes on an egg or cylindrical shape; in the human the epiblast forms into a horizontal, disc-shape the bilaminar disc. A study that looked at this morphological difference between a human embryo initial development and a mouse embryo, concluded that it is likely that Reichert's membrane is the key regulator of the epiblast's horizontal growth.
