= NUDT6 =

Protein-coding gene in the species Homo sapiens

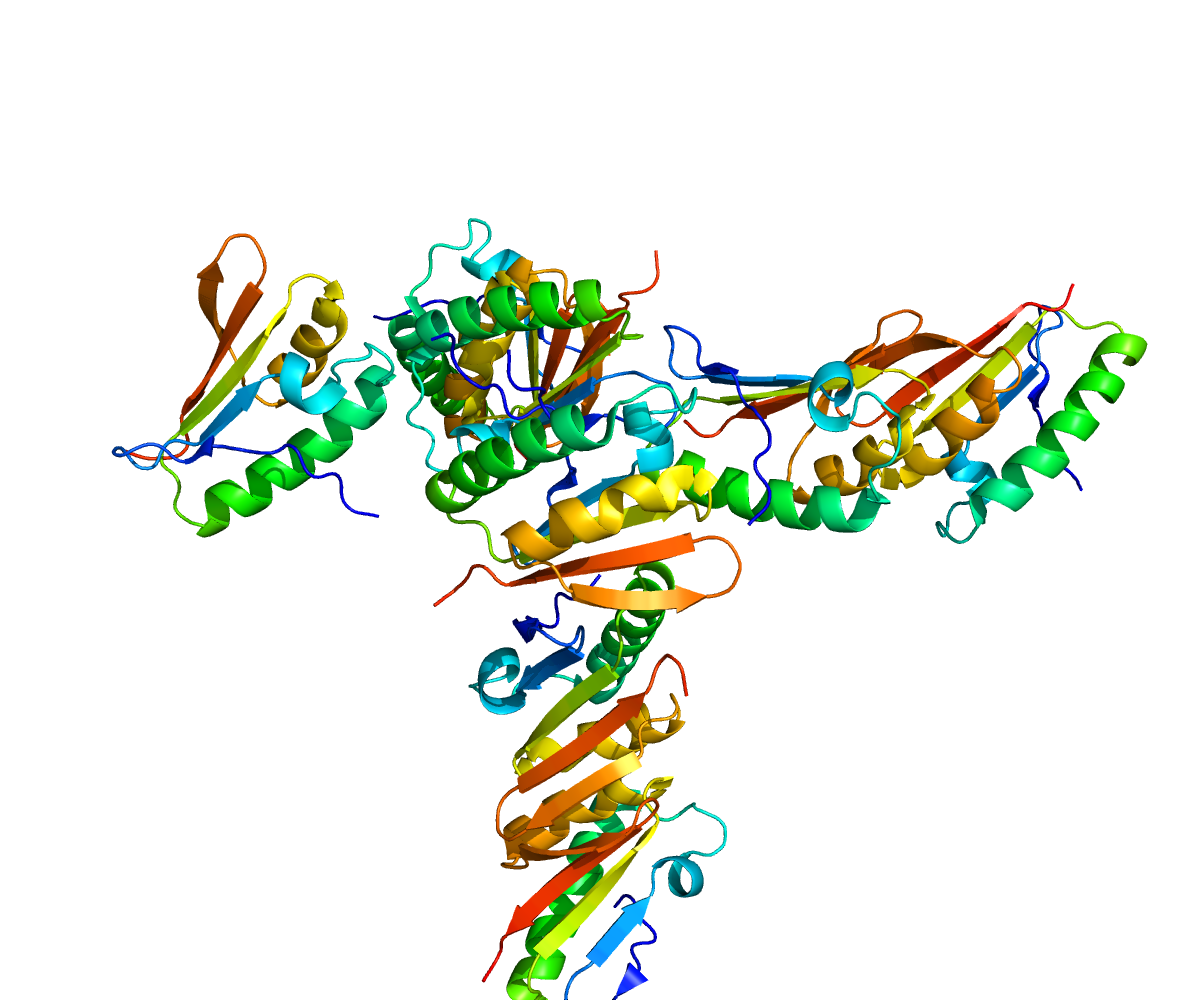

Identifiers
- Aliases: NUDT6, ASFGF2, FGF-AS, FGF2AS, GFG-1, GFG1, nudix hydrolase 6
- External IDs: OMIM: 606261; MGI: 2387618; GeneCards: NUDT6
Available structures
PDB	Ortholog search: PDBe RCSB
PDB	List of PDB id codes 3FXT, 3H95
Enzyme activity
EC #	BRENDA	ExPASy	KEGG	MetaCyc
3.6.1.18	↗	↗	↗	↗
3.6.1.22	↗	↗	↗	↗

Gene location (Human)
Chr.	Chromosome 4 (human)
Band	4q28.1	Start	122,888,697 bp
Band	4q28.1	End	122,922,968 bp

Gene location (Mouse)
Chr.	Chromosome 3 (mouse)
Band	3|3 B	Start	37,459,059 bp
Band	3|3 B	End	37,474,360 bp
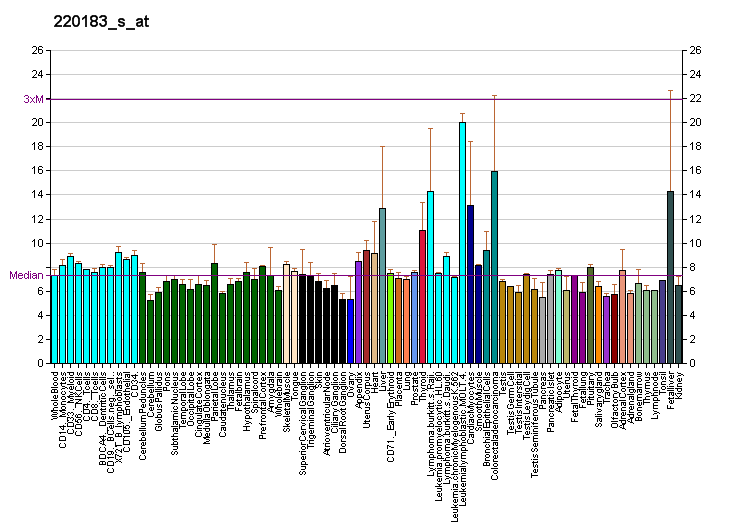
RNA expression pattern
Bgee	Human / Mouse (ortholog); Top expressed in: tendon of biceps brachii; internal globus pallidus; right lobe of liver; germinal epithelium; oocyte; left ventricle; right adrenal gland; right adrenal cortex; right ventricle; left adrenal gland / Top expressed in: interventricular septum; aortic valve; ascending aorta; right kidney; muscle of thigh; proximal tubule; masseter muscle; myocardium of ventricle; skeletal muscle tissue; sternocleidomastoid muscle; More reference expression data
BioGPS	More reference expression data
Gene ontology
Molecular function	growth factor activity; hydrolase activity; NADH pyrophosphatase activity; ADP-ribose diphosphatase activity; NAD binding
Cellular component	cytoplasm; mitochondrion; nucleus; cellular component
Biological process	regulation of signaling receptor activity; biological process; negative regulation of cell population proliferation; negative regulation of cell cycle
Sources:Amigo / QuickGO
Orthologs
Databases	NCBI: entry; OMA: entry
Species	Human	Mouse
Entrez	11162	229228
Ensembl	ENSG00000170917	ENSMUSG00000050174
UniProt	P53370	Q8CH40
RefSeq (mRNA)	NM_198041; NM_007083	NM_001291044; NM_153561
RefSeq (protein)	NP_009014; NP_932158	NP_001277973; NP_705789
Location (UCSC)	Chr 4: 122.89 – 122.92 Mb	Chr 3: 37.46 – 37.47 Mb
PubMed search
- Wikidata
View/Edit Human	View/Edit Mouse

Nucleoside diphosphate-linked moiety X motif 6 is a protein that in humans is encoded by the NUDT6 gene.

FGF2 (MIM 134920) is a highly conserved, multifunctional heparin-binding growth factor involved in neuroectoderm development, angiogenesis, and wound healing.

Elevated levels of FGF2 are associated with proliferation of smooth muscle in atherosclerosis and with proliferation of tumors. The FGF2 antisense gene, NUDT6, may regulate FGF2 expression.[supplied by OMIM]
