= Preimplantation factor =

Peptide involved in placental development

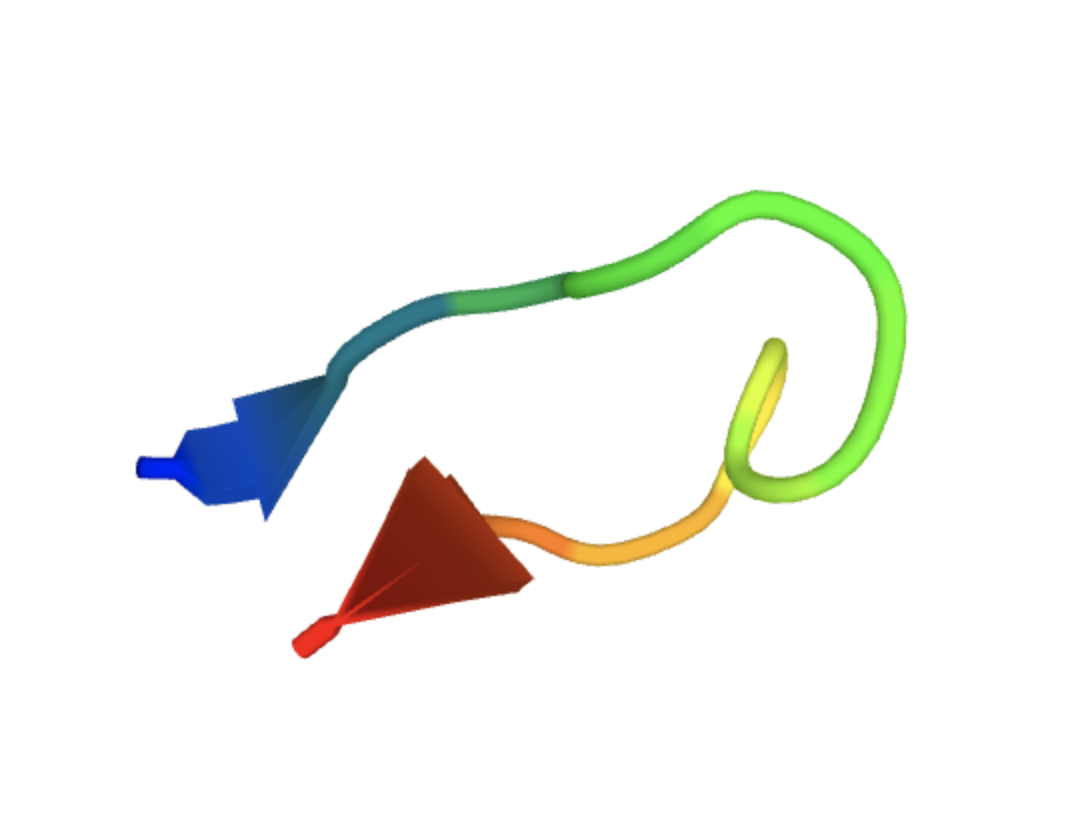
- Simulated structure of preimplantation factor

Identifiers
- Symbol: PIF
- Alt. names: PreImplantation factor, PIF, sPIF, PIF*

Preimplantation factor (PIF) is a peptide secreted by trophoblast cells prior to placenta formation in early embryonic development. Human embryos begin to express PIF at the 4-cell stage, with expression increasing by the morula stage and continuing to do so throughout the first trimester. Expression of preimplantation factor in the blastocyst was discovered as an early correlate of the viability of the eventual pregnancy. Preimplantation factor was identified in 1994 by a lymphocyte platelet-binding assay, where it was thought to be an early biomarker of pregnancy. It has a simple primary structure with a short sequence of fifteen amino acids without any known quaternary structure. A synthetic analogue of preimplantation factor (commonly abbreviated in studies as sPIF or PIF*) that has an identical amino acid sequence and mimics the normal biological activity of PIF has been developed and is commonly used in research studies, particularly those that aim to study potential adult therapeutics.

Preimplantation factor acts by paracrine signaling; that is to say trophoblast cells, which collectively form extra-embryonic tissues, secrete it onto the surface of the endometrium. PIF is known to influence many events in the implantation process, the process by which an early embryo implants into the uterine wall. A crucial event in human implantation is when trophoblast cells expressing preimplantation factor invade the uterine wall and found the placenta, an organ that connects maternal blood supply, and along with it, nutrients, to the growing fetus. This requires changes to the histology of the endometrium; a process called decidualisation. Upregulated expression of PIF increases the presence of integrins on the endometrium wall, promoting the embryo's adhesion to the uterine wall. PIF is thought to modulate and facilitate the depth of the trophoblast's invasion into the uterus at physiological doses.

Maternal immune system regulation is also a critical event in implantation as the early embryo is essentially a partial allograft, that is a tissue that is recognised as fully identical to that of the mother. Consequently, the embryo may be rejected and attacked if it is not recognised, an event that normally causes spontaneous miscarriage. Preimplantation factor regionally modulates the mother's immune system, decreasing the activity of peripheral maternal leukocytes, reducing inflammation and consequently also increasing the chance that the embryo will be tolerated. Preimplantation factor is also an anti-apoptotic effector, maintaining the trophoblast cell integrity through the intrinsic p53 signalling pathway. Moreover, preimplantation factor protects the central nervous system by downregulating pathways that promote neurone death and promoting neurogenesis. PIF is also known to signal against neonatal prematurity and rescues embryos from toxic uterine environments.

Due to its multiple autoimmune and neuroprotective effects in the embryonic environment, preimplantation factor has been studied in clinical environments as a potential novel therapy for reproductive, autoimmune and neurodegenerative diseases. PIF has been successfully studied as a therapy for recurrent pregnancy loss, as it is able to rescue non-viable embryos from a hostile maternal environment. It has also been shown to prevent diabetes mellitus type 1 in mice due to its ability to modulate immunological tolerance in the pancreas. Finally, it reverses paralysis and neuroinflammation whilst promoting neurogenesis in adult patients with neurodegenerative diseases. It also may be able to decrease the severity of brain injuries by modulating the behaviour of supporting cells in the nervous system.

== Discovery and structure ==
Preimplantation factor has a simple primary peptide structure with a 15 amino acid sequence (MVRIKPGSANKPSDD).

As the regulation of the maternal immune system is a requisite for successful implantation, the immune system shows different characteristics in pregnant women and non-pregnant women. In 1994, preimplantation factor was isolated by a lymphocyte platelet-binding assay that compared immune responses and proteins found in pregnant women and non-pregnant women. The assay also compared immune responses with men to verify if the proteins were specific to female reproductive tissues. Results generated in the preliminary study showed that "a preimplantation factor" was being expressed exclusively in pregnant women. On the fourth day after embryo transfer in women who had undergone successful in-vitro fertilisation, this protein was also found, suggesting that it had a role in the determination of the viability of the embryo. Subsequent studies, most seminally including a 1996 study that partially characterised the biological activity of PIF, adopted and established the current term "preimplantation factor" as the name for this novel peptide.

== Functions ==
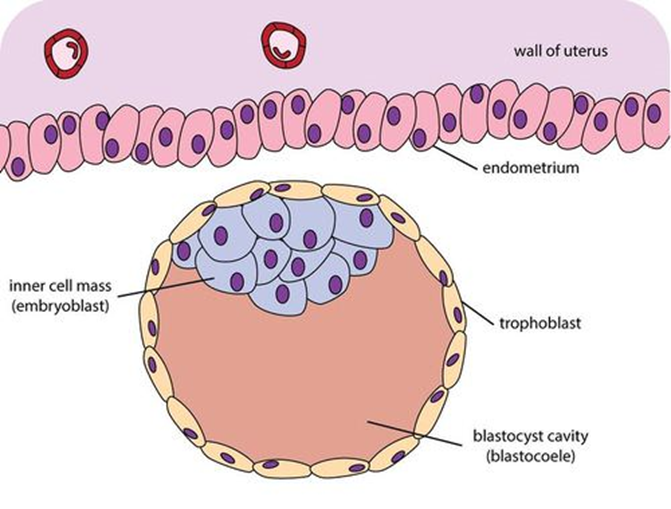
The outer layer of trophoblast cells invade the endometrium

=== Trophoblast invasion and adhesion ===
Trophoblast cells form the outer lining of the blastocyst in preimplantation development, eventually forming more differentiated extra-embryonic tissues including the placenta. Before this differentiation can occur the embryo's invasion and infiltration into the uterine wall must be tightly regulated by both maternal and foetal signals, including secretion of PIF by trophoblast cells. In particular, preimplantation factor is thought to have a paracrine effect on the decidualisation process, which ultimately primes trophoblast cells to invade appropriately into the endometrium. When compared to non-functional short peptides at the same concentration, application of PIF to the endometrium at the implantation stage promoted deeper invasion of the embryo. This effect was not observed to occur indefinitely with successive increases of concentration and any artificial increases of PIF above the human physiological concentration (approximately 50 nmol/L) did not meaningfully increase the invasion of the embryo. Consequently, it is thought that PIF is limited in its promotion of trophoblast invasion by maternal signals.

The outermost layer of the uterine wall is an epithelial tissue called the endometrium that requires cell surface adhesion molecules called integrins to adhere the embryo. This additional paracrine effect of PIF has been shown to increase the expression of the integrin molecule α2β3 on the cell membranes of cells in the endometrium. Integrins are a broad class of cell adhesion molecules that allow cells to bind to extracellular matrix. In this way, they assist the entire embryo in binding to the uterine wall, an important event in successfully generating a placenta.

=== Maternal immune tolerance ===
The embryo is immunologically characterised as a partial allograft as it is not a maternal tissue. During fertilisation, a paternal spermatozoon fuses with a maternal oocyte producing a zygote. Phenotypically, the zygote expresses certain epitopes that are controlled by genes inherited from the father, making the embryo a foreign material. In order for successful implantation to occur, the maternal immune system must tolerate the presence of the embryo while not completely inactivating its innate responsiveness to foreign pathogens. This process is not always successful; indeed maternal immune rejection of the embryo is a common and well-characterised cause of recurrent pregnancy loss.

Preimplantation factor has a significant role in signalling this grafting behaviour; it has been, for instance shown to signal an anti-inflammatory response in a broad range of peripheral blood mononuclear cells. PIF also impacts similar cytoskeletal proteins in CD14+, CD8+ and CD4+ cells suggesting that they have a broad and integrative role in modulating the immune system of the mother. In particular, PIF inhibits the process of platelet aggregation in helper T lymphocytes and skeletal proteins in cytotoxic T cells. While PIF attenuates or modulates the immune system, it does not effect the response to other pathogens or foreign material. This modulatory effect on immunological tolerance is responsible for a strong correlation between PIF expression and the viability of pregnancy.

=== Viability of pregnancy ===
The expression of preimplantation factor in the embryo is strongly correlated with the likelihood of a live birth. This observed viability is not solely due to PIF's ability to mediate the implantation and allografting process but also due to its ability to promote the upregulation and integrity of certain intracellular targets that are positively associated with normal developmental processes. For instance, PIF is known to target the enzyme disulfide isomerase, which reduces intracellular oxidative stress and also heat-shock proteins, which are molecular chaperones that ensure proteins produced by a cell will fold into the correct conformation for their function. Additionally, PIF is known to promote the production of vital cytoskeletal proteins including actin and tubulin that are required for the current morphological development of nerve axons and the viscera of vital organs. Axons use circular tubulin polymers called microtubules to transport intracellular material between the cell body and the axon terminal and require actin to form synapses. They are hence important for the organisation and function of the growing immune system.

Additionally, when uterine serum from patients with recurrent pregnancy loss is applied to embryos that are positive for PIF, they display the capacity to resist the toxin and are able to survive. Combined, these observations and combination of intracellular effects suggest that PIF has multifaceted impacts directed towards viable pregnancy.

=== Neurogenic and anti-apoptotic effects ===
In the prenatal environment, PIF has neuroprotective impacts. It protects the growing fetus against neonatal prematurity, preventing the fetus from being delivered before adequate neural development has taken place. The neurogenic effects of PIF are not isolated to the prenatal environment; in fact PIF is thought to have impacts throughout life. In adult models, PIF has multiple neurogenic effects: it promotes the growth of neurons and reduces neuroinflammation. It is thought to have these impacts by modulating signalling through the ubiquitous protein kinase A and protein kinase C intracellular signalling pathways. PIF also inhibits microRNA let-7, a sequence that is highly upregulated in the central nervous system. The Let-7 system has been associated with cell death in neurons, and PIF is known to inhibit this process from occurring. In rats that were induced to have a hypoxic-ischemic brain injury, PIF was able to promote neuron growth, reduced detrimental responses by neuroglia and was able to generate a significant cerebral cortex volume, suggesting it could rescue rats from side effects of brain damage.

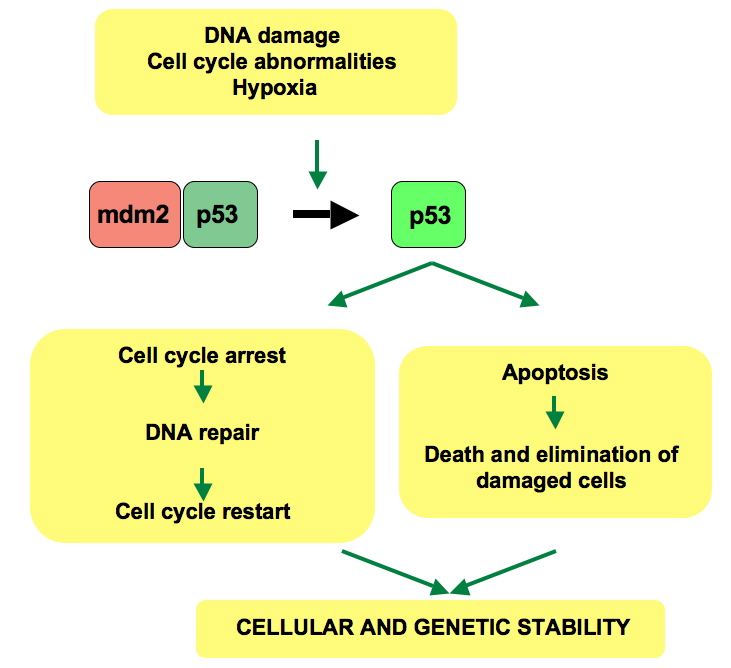
Preimplantation factor deactivates p53, preventing apoptosis

PIF also has a series of anti-apoptotic impacts in human extravillous trophoblasts, mediated by the TP53 gene. Apoptosis is a controlled cell death process that must not occur if a cell is to proliferate. PIF has specific anti-apoptotic impacts by reducing the phosphorylation of the p53 protein at the serine-15 residue. Without phosphorylation p53 is unstable and undergoes ubiquitylation, signalling the trophoblast and endometrial cells to degrade it in proteasomes and attenuating downstream apoptotic effects. PIF, in particular, has been correlated with increasing the expression of anti-apoptotic effector BCL2 and decreasing the expression of pro-apoptotic effector BAX. BCL2, which is upregulated by PIF, ensures that cytochrome c remains within the inner mitochondrial membrane and hence does not trigger the production of an apoptosome in the cell cytosol. BAX, which is downregulated by PIF, produces transmembrane transport channels that liberate cytochrome c, triggering apoptosis. Collectively, these biochemical effects show that PIF signals against the internal mechanisms of apoptosis in extravillous trophoblast cells, allowing them to proliferate before they implant into the uterine wall.

== Therapeutic uses ==
Given its multifaceted functionality, including autoimmune, neuroprotective and anti-apoptotic effects, preimplantation factor has been extensively studied as a potential therapeutic agent in both reproductive and non-reproductive medical contexts. PIF is also advantageous because of its easily replicable biochemical structure. In reproductive contexts, PIF has been studied as a treatment for infertility. In women with recurrent pregnancy loss, treatment with PIF is able to rescue a non-viable embryo and promotes a successful implantation and pregnancy. It does this by mitigating the toxic influence of certain factors that naturally occur in the uterus, such as acidity.

PIF has also been studied in a range of other non-reproductive contexts. Due to the ability of PIF to attenuate the attack mechanisms of mononuclear immune cells, it has been implicated as a successful treatment for autoimmune diseases including diabetes mellitus type 1 in mice studies. Diabetes mellitus type 1 is characterised by the misrecognition of pancreatic beta islet cells as foreign material. These studies show that PIF is able to preserve the pancreatic beta islet cell's integrity, rescuing them from the autoimmune attacks which cause diabetes. In adult models, PIF also reverses the pathological neuroinflammation caused by autoimmune diseases such as multiple sclerosis. It also reverses paralysis and promotes growth of neurons in patients with neurodegeneration.
