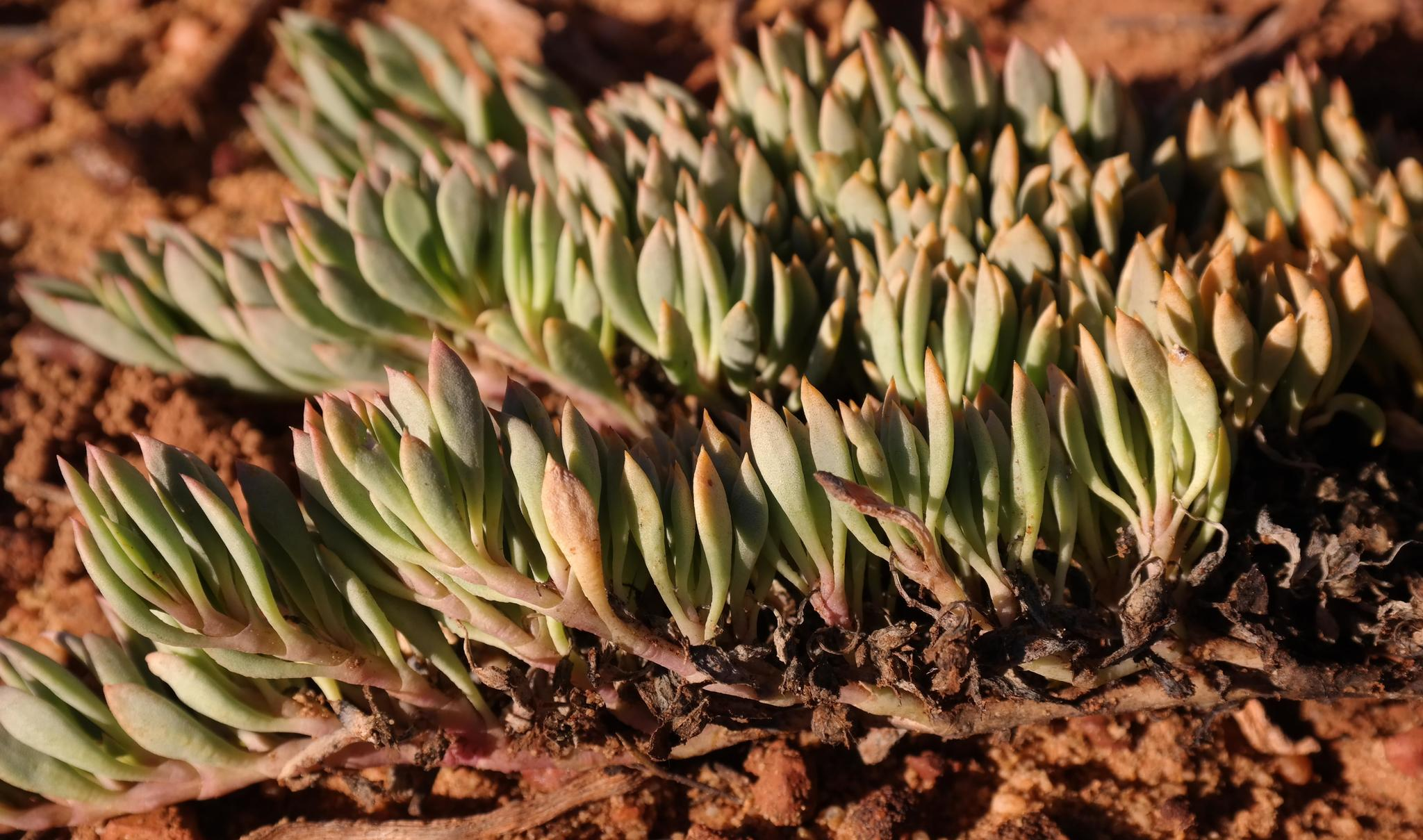
- Acrosanthes anceps

Scientific classification
- Kingdom: Plantae
- Clade: Tracheophytes
- Clade: Angiosperms
- Clade: Eudicots
- Order: Caryophyllales
- Family: Aizoaceae
- Subfamily: Acrosanthoideae; Klak
- Genus: Acrosanthes; Eckl. & Zeyh. (1837)

Synonyms
- Didaste E.Mey. ex Harv. & Sond. (1862)

= Acrosanthes =

Genus of plants

Acrosanthes is a genus of flowering plants in the family Aizoaceae. It is native to the Namibia and South Africa's Cape Provinces in Southern Africa.

== Description ==
Plants in this genus are generally prostrate to sprawling branching perennials with opposite succulent leaves. Inflorescences are a cyme, and flowers have 5 calyx lobes, 8 to many stamen, and an inferior ovary. Fruits are 2 loculed capsules with basal placentation (see "in plants"), and the fruit is xerochastic (fruit dehisces when dry). Their seeds are likely dispersed by ants.

== Taxonomy ==
This genus was first described by Ecklon and Zeyher in 1837.

== Species ==
There are 7 recognized species as of 2022:

1. Acrosanthes anceps (Thunb.) Sond.
2. Acrosanthes angustifolia Eckl. & Zeyh.
3. Acrosanthes decandra Fenzl
4. Acrosanthes humifusa (Thunb.) Sond.
5. Acrosanthes microphylla Adamson
6. Acrosanthes parviflora J.C.Manning & Goldblatt
7. Acrosanthes teretifolia Eckl. & Zeyh.
