= Southern grass skink =

There are two species of skink named southern grass skink:

- Pseudemoia entrecasteauxii, endemic to Australia
- Heremites septemtaeniatus, found in the Middle East
