= Repeated implantation failure =

Failure of an embryo to implant

Repeated implantation failure (RIF) is the repeated failure of the embryo to implant onto the side of the uterus wall following IVF treatment. Implantation happens at 6–7 days after conception and involves the embedding of the growing embryo into the mothers uterus and a connection being formed. A successful implantation can be determined by using an ultrasound to view the sac which the baby grows in, inside the uterus.

However, the exact definition of RIF is debated. Recently the most commonly accepted definition is when a woman under 40 has gone through three unsuccessful cycles of IVF, when in each cycle four good quality eggs have been transferred.

Repeated implantation failure should not be confused with recurrent IVF failure. Recurrent IVF failure is a much more broad term and includes all repeated failures to get pregnant from IVF. Repeated implantation failure specifically refers to those failures due to unsuccessful implanting to the uterus wall.

An unsuccessful implantation can result from problems with the mother or with the embryo. It is essential that the mother and embryo are able to communicate with each other during all stages of pregnancy, and an absence of this communication can lead to an unsuccessful implantation and a further unsuccessful pregnancy.

== Contributing maternal factors ==
During implantation, the embryo must cross the epithelial layer of the maternal endometrium before invading and implanting in the stroma layer. Maternal factors, including congenital uterine abnormalities, fibroids, endometrial polyps, intrauterine adhesions, adenomyosis, thrombophilia and endometriosis, can reduce the chances of implantation and result in RIF.

=== Congenital uterine abnormalities ===
Congenital uterine abnormalities are irregularities in the uterus which occur during the mothers foetal development.

=== Hox genes ===
Two Hox genes have been identified to assist in the development and receptivity of the uterus and endometrium, Hoxa10 and Hoxa11. Hoxa10 has been shown to change the upper uterine segment into oviduct-like structures, creating a smaller uterus that appears normal. Embryo transfer into the lower uterine segment does not allow for implantation, so the Hoxa10 gene has multiple effects throughout the uterus. Hoxa11 mutations alter the endometrial gland development and reduce the secretion of Leukaemia-Inhibitory factor (LIF) which is required for implantation.

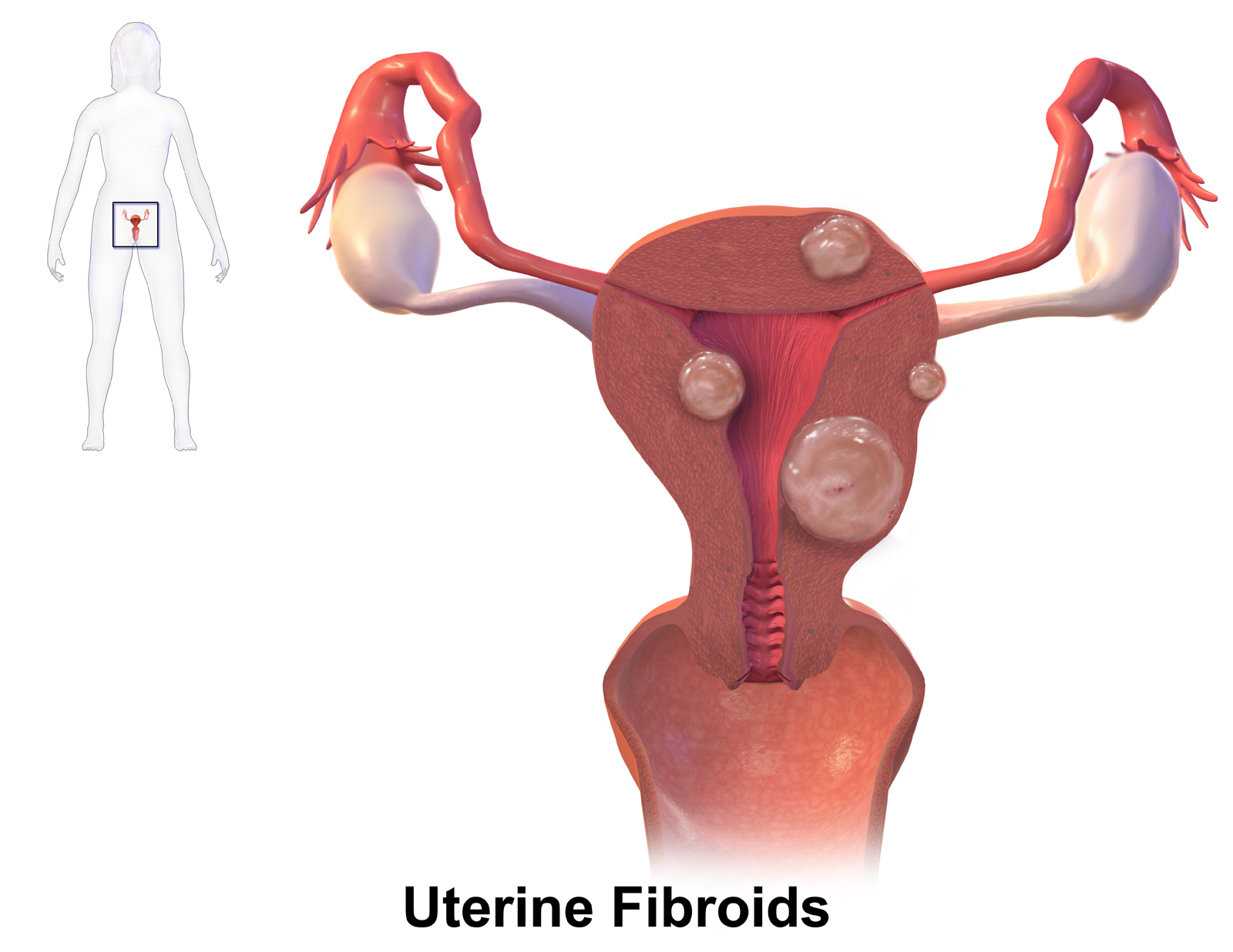
Uterine Fibroid

=== Fibroids ===
Fibroids are benign tumours found in the smooth muscle of the uterus, they are often asymptomatic but can cause pelvic pain. They effect implantation rates by altering the shape and cytokine composition of the uterus. Removal of submucosal fibroids has shown to increase implantation rates.

=== Endometrial polyps ===
Endometrial polyps are benign tumours found in the endometrium which factor into female infertility. There has been limited research into if their removal increases the chances of implantation and pregnancy.

=== Intrauterine adhesions ===
Intrauterine adhesions (Asherman's Syndrome) occur from scar tissue within the uterus which cause the closure of part or all of the uterus. The adhesions prevent embryos from implanting by reducing the surface area and decreasing the receptivity. Intrauterine adhesions normally occur after damage has been caused to the endometrium, either through removal of unwanted pregnancies, miscarriage, infection, and surgical damage.

=== Thrombophilia ===
Thrombophilia is a condition which makes the blood more likely to clot and this increases cardiovascular risk, meaning the individual is at higher risk of heart attacks, strokes or DVTs. In pregnancy it can lead to a disruption in the flow of blood to the placenta and the uterus wall. This can lead to a decreased receptivity of the uterus wall for a pregnancy and can lead to a miscarriage further on. However, how significantly this contributes to RIF is not fully known but each case should be assessed on a personal basis by a clinician

== Embryonic factors ==
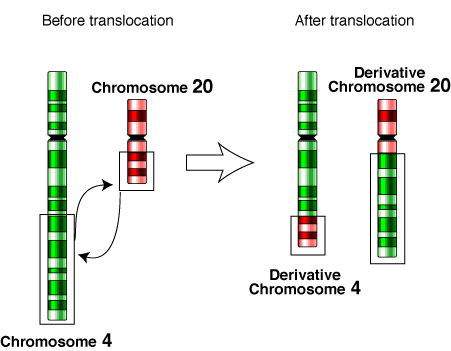
Figure 1: The exchange of chromosomal segments between chromosomes 4 to 20. Since no segments are lost, this is a balanced translocation.

The successful implantation of an embryo not only relies on a receptive uterine environment in the mother but also on the quality of the embryo itself. Embryo quality and probability of implantation can be affected by maternal and paternal genetic abnormalities as well as zona pellucida dysfunction and poor embryo transfer technique.

=== Male genetic abnormalities ===
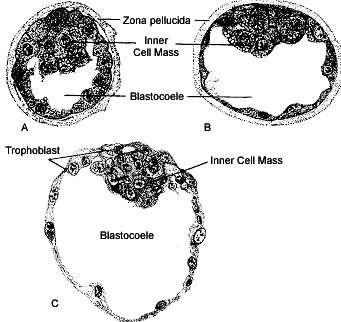
Figure 2: The zona pellucida surrounds the blastocyst cavity that contains the inner cell mass.

The quality of the sperm that fertilizes an egg is a key contributor to the overall quality of the embryo. Abnormalities in DNA fragmentation and chromosomal arrangements are the main source of genetic deviation in males that can affect embryo quality. DNA fragmentation occurs when the strands of DNA are separated to form two separate strands, this disrupts the genetic information that is coded in genes. Depending on the severity of the fragmentation, this can lead to the dysfunction of specific genes which may or may not be essential for embryo survival and in this case the initiation of implantation. DNA fragmentation can happen spontaneously in cells that undergo programmed cell death (apoptosis) where DNA is broken apart by enzymes called endonucleases. However, since the male DNA isn't activated until around day 3 after fertilisation, it is often difficult to diagnose sperm genetic abnormalities because morphological studies could identify a good quality oocyte when initial transfer occurs, but due to DNA fragmentation in the sperm, the embryo will die after day 3 of growth.

=== Female genetic abnormalities ===
Oocyte quality is also a main contributor to overall embryo quality since it is the DNA of the oocyte that is mainly involved in the first 3 days of embryo growth following fertilization. A major source of genetic abnormalities are balanced translocations (Figure 1).

A translocation involves the exchange of segments of chromosomes that are not a homologous pair. In most cases, this leads to balanced translocations, in which no DNA is lost therefore is usually asymptomatic. However, as female gametes are formed, it is probable that 2/3 of embryos produced will have unbalanced translocations within their DNA if fertilised by sperm with a balanced translocation too. Translocation mutations can occur at any point during fertilization or even the first meiotic division that the oocyte undergoes during foetal life.

=== Zona pellucida dysfunction ===
The female egg (oocyte) is surrounded by a layer of glycoproteins called the zona pellucida. Once fertilisation has occurred, this layer will harden to prevent further sperm entering and maintain the shape of the fertilized egg (zygote) as it divides to form a blastocyst (Figure 2). Once the inner cell mass - the group of cells within the blastocyst that go on to form the embryo - starts to expand, lysin enzymes secreted by the inner cell mass will act on the zona pellucida and weaken the hardened structure. Eventually, this will cause the rupture of the zona pellucida, allowing the blastocyst to hatch and begin to implant into the uterine wall.

If the zona pellucida fails to thin in preparation for rupture, this will prevent the blastocyst from hatching and therefore be unable to implant, therefore this is a probable cause of repeated implantation failure (RIF). This is supported by a study which showed that implantation rates in women who received assisted zona pellucida hatching - use of synthetic chemical to artificially weaken the zona pellucida - increased.

== Investigations ==
Women with RIF should undergo ovarian function testing to explore their levels of FSH, AMH and any other hormones or follicle counts which may indicate the overall behaviour of the ovarian reserve. Male partners may also be offered laboratory testing of sperm DNA integrity.

In the instance of genetic testing, karyotyping may be made available to couples with RIF to exclude the possibility of balanced chromosomal translocations. Ultrasounds may be used to oversee the morphological growth and development of follicles throughout IVF treatment, in addition to assessing endometrial thickness.

Hysteroscopy is an essential part of investigating a couple's RIF pathology and is used as a diagnostic tool to examine the cervical canal and uterine cavity.

== Management ==
In depth reviews of the underlying causes of a couple's infertility should be undertaken with a qualified fertility specialist in order to make decisions regarding further management.

Modifiable risk factors include smoking, alcohol consumption and BMI. Women with RIF should be advised to abstain from both alcohol and smoking, and male partners may also consider cessation of smoking due to effects associated with weaker sperm counts and damage to sperm DNA and motility. An ideal BMI target for women with RIF is between 19 and 29; obese women may consider structured weight-loss programmes and regular exercise over bariatric surgery due to potential folate, iron, vitamin B12 and other nutritional deficiencies.

Table below showing the main first-line treatments for couples undergoing RIF.

Contribution	Factors	Treatment
Maternal	Uterine anatomy	Myomectomy; Removal of polyps and intrauterine adhesions
Maternal	Impaired endometrial function	Aspirin; Sildenafil; Mechanical stimulation of the endometrium; High dose oestradiol
Maternal	Thrombophilia	LMWH; Aspirin
Maternal	Immunology	High dose (30g) of IVIg before embryo transfer and a second similar dose when fetal heart rate is noticed
Embryonic	Genetic causes	Karyotyping; Pre-implantation genetic diagnosis (PGD)
Embryonic	Impaired embryo development in utero	Laser assisted hatching; Blastocyst culture and transfer; ZIFT
Paternal	Male factor contribution	IMSI
