= Laminin 111 =

Protein

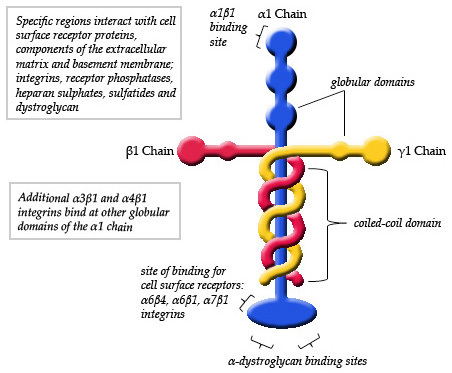
A schematic diagram of the structure of laminin 111 and several hypothesized binding sites of cell-surface receptors.

Laminin–111 (also "laminin–1") is a protein of the type known as laminin isoforms. It was among the first of the laminin isoforms to be discovered. The "111" identifies the isoform's chain composition of α1β1γ1. This protein plays an important role in embryonic development. Injections of this substance are used in treatment for Duchenne muscular dystrophy, and its cellular action may potentially become a focus of study in cancer research.

== Distribution ==
The distribution of the different laminin isoforms is tissue-specific. Laminin–111 is predominantly expressed in the embryonic epithelium, but can also be found in some adult epithelium such as the kidney, liver, testis, ovaries, and brain blood vessels. Different levels of expression of α chains have a large influence on the differential expression of laminin, thereby determining the isoform produced. From studying a mouse model, it was found that transcription factors present in the parietal endoderm regulate the expression of the α1 and large amounts of laminin-111 are produced.

== Functions ==
The synthesized laminin–111 formed in an embryo contributes to the formation of Reichert’s membrane, a thick extra-embryonic basement membrane. When the laminin α1 chain is deficient in an organism, an embryo dies, likely as a result of a defective Reichert’s membrane due to a lack of laminin–111 being produced. Laminin-111 has been identified as a crucial molecule for development of the embryo as shown by the consequences that occur when laminin-111 is lacking.

Laminin-111 is expressed very early on in development and is present in the blastocyst. When various parts of the trimer chains are knocked out by mutations, devastating consequences occur in the embryo. If the β1 or γ1 chains of laminin-111 are absent the basement membrane fails to form. Without a basement membrane cells have nowhere to attach and all dependent activities such as cell migration and epithelial formation can no longer occur. The self-assembly and tight network formation by laminin-111 are essential for holding the basement membrane together.

Although it is expressed abundantly during the early embryonic stage, laminin-111 is mostly absent in adults. The injection of laminin-111, however, helps with Duchenne muscular dystrophy, a neuromuscular disease in which the connection between the extracellular matrix and cell cytoskeleton is lost. Increased levels of laminin-111 triggered an increase in the expression of α7-integrin receptor and this prevented onset of the disease. Additionally, the presence of laminin-111 increased muscle strength and protected it from injury. When injected with myoblast transplants, laminin–111 decreased degeneration and inflammatory reactions and increased the success of the transplantation. The experiments utilizing laminin–111 as a source of therapy for Duchenne muscular dystrophy suggest that it has protective qualities in addition to its association with muscle tissue.

== Mechanisms of action ==
=== Cell adhesion ===
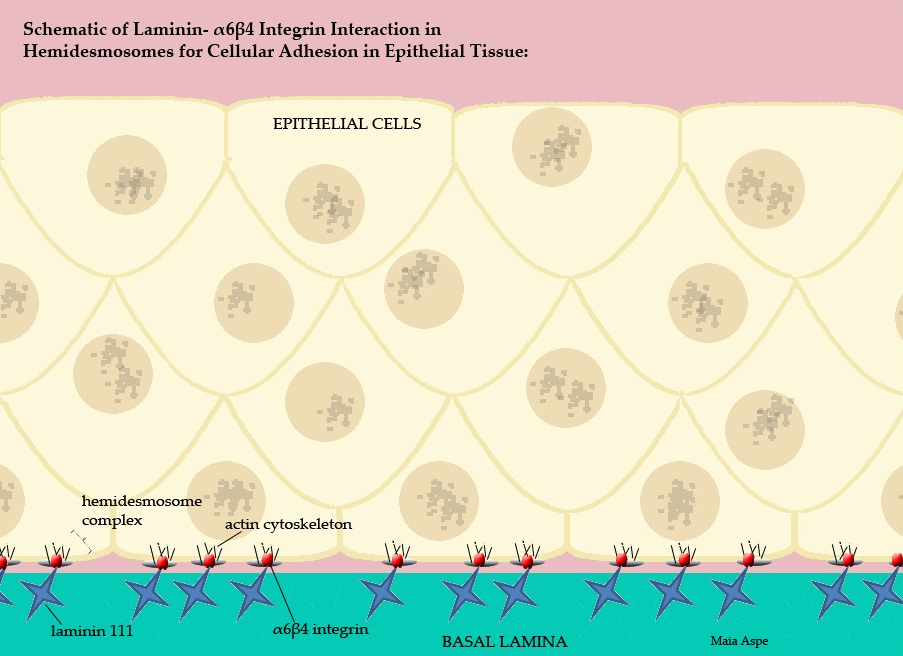
A schematic diagram of the laminin 111-α6β4 integrin interaction in hemidesmosomes for cell adhesion in epithelial tissue.

In cell adhesion laminin-111 and other isoforms are important proteins that anchor cells to the extracellular matrix (ECM). The linkage between cells and the ECM is formed by binding cell surface receptors to one end of the laminin α chain and binding ECM components to another region of the laminin. Globular domains (G-Domain) of the α chain are the regions on laminin-111 that allow the binding of integrins, glycoproteins, sulfated glycolipids and dystroglycan.

=== Cell signaling ===
Besides anchoring cells to the ECM, laminins are also involved in the signalling of cells and other components of the ECM. Even though there is not a general mechanism that applies to all laminins in signalling, there are some common pathways that can be seen in more than one isoform of laminin. For example, the PI3K/AKT pathway is used by laminin-111 (promotes cell-survival), 511 (prevents apoptosis with laminin 521), and 521 (stabilizes pluripotency of human embryonic stem cells). The pathway begins with the adhesion of the cell to the ECM for activation of the lipid-associated PI3K. Once PI3K is activated, it will localize AKT that is in the cytoplasm to the cell membrane where AKT is then phosphorylated to promote cell survival.

=== Neurite outgrowth ===
When α chains of laminin-111 bind to cell surface receptors integrins α1β1, α3β1, α4β1, α6β1 and Cdc42 GTPase are activated. The activated GTPase then activates Cdc42 which further activates c-Jun kinases and phosphorylation of Jun. Activation of c-Jun kinases leads to high levels of c-Jun expression which results in neurite outgrowth. The synthesis of Nitric Oxides resides somewhere in the pathway and is yet to be determined. Weston et al. (2000) proposed that the synthesis of Nitric Oxide may be upstream to the activation of Cdc42. Nonetheless, Nitric Oxide synthesis is shown to be an important element in laminin-mediated neurite outgrowth.

=== Future applications ===
==== Dynamic reciprocity theory ====
The dynamic reciprocity theory states that a cell’s fate depends on the exchange of chemical signals between the extracellular matrix and the nucleus of the cell. Focussing on connections between laminin-111 and other proteins involved in cell-to-cell communication could spark further research that may help to further our current understanding of cancer and how to slow down or stop its process.

Actin plays a role in nuclear activity which is an important process with regard to cell signalling influencing cell differentiation and replication. It has been suggested that actin interactions directly influence gene transcription as it interacts with chromatin remodeling complexes as well as RNA polymerases I, II and III. However, the exact role that actin plays in transcription has not yet been determined.

==== Implications for cancer research ====
A group of distinguished scientists from the U.S. Department of Energy’s (DOE) Lawrence Berkeley National Laboratory (Berkeley Lab) did a recent study on how laminin-111 interacts with the cytoplasmic protein, actin. Their study gave the following conclusions:

The biological process in which a cell ceases to continue growing and dividing is called quiescence (the opposite of cancer). ECM laminin-111 sends chemical signals that promotes adhesion of a cell and its ECM. Although the mechanism is unknown, these signals have also been linked to cell quiescence. Adding laminin-111 to breast epithelial cells leads to quiescence by altering nuclear actin. High levels of laminin-111 deplete nuclear actin which induces quiescence of cells. However, when an isoform of actin, that cannot exit a cell’s nucleus, is active, cells continue to grow and divide even when laminin levels are high. ECM laminin-111 levels in a normal breast cell are significantly higher than laminin-111 levels in tissues of cancerous breast tissue. Simply increasing laminin levels in the ECM of cancerous breast cells is not enough to lead to quiescence. Therefore, it is implied that there are multiple factors working together influencing cell-to-cell communication. How laminin-111 and nuclear actin communicate is one of these factors. Laminin-111 could be the physiological regulator of nuclear actin which would suggest that depleting nuclear actin could be a key to achieving cell quiescence and returning to homeostatic operating conditions. Decreased expression of laminin-111 and the growth-inhibitory signals that it produces in malignant myoepithelial cells begs for further investigation with regard to cancer research. Therefore, further exploration of laminin-111 and nuclear actin interaction could be a target for future experimental therapeutic investigations.
