= 60S ribosomal protein L6 =

Protein found in humans

RPL6

Identifiers
- Aliases: RPL6, L6, SHUJUN-2, TAXREB107, TXREB1, ribosomal protein L6
- External IDs: OMIM: 603703; MGI: 3647789; GeneCards: RPL6
Available structures
PDB	Human UniProt search: PDBe RCSB
PDB	List of PDB id codes 4UG0, 4V6X, 5AJ0, 4D67, 4D5Y, 4UJE

Gene location (Human)
Chr.	Chromosome 12 (human)
Band	12q24.13	Start	112,405,189 bp
Band	12q24.13	End	112,418,838 bp
RNA expression pattern
Bgee	Human / Mouse (ortholog); Top expressed in: ganglionic eminence; ventricular zone; gonad; islet of Langerhans; pituitary gland; Achilles tendon; lymph node; left ovary; smooth muscle tissue; monocyte / n/a; More reference expression data
BioGPS	n/a
Gene ontology
Molecular function	DNA binding; structural constituent of ribosome; cadherin binding; RNA binding
Cellular component	cytosol; ribosome; membrane; focal adhesion; intracellular anatomical structure; cytoplasmic ribonucleoprotein granule; cytosolic large ribosomal subunit; nucleus; cytoplasm; endoplasmic reticulum; rough endoplasmic reticulum; postsynaptic density; polysomal ribosome; synapse
Biological process	cytoplasmic translation; regulation of transcription, DNA-templated; protein biosynthesis; viral transcription; SRP-dependent cotranslational protein targeting to membrane; ribosomal large subunit assembly; translational initiation; nuclear-transcribed mRNA catabolic process, nonsense-mediated decay; rRNA processing
Sources:Amigo / QuickGO
Orthologs
Databases	NCBI: entry; OMA: entry
Species	Human	Mouse
Entrez	6128	432502
Ensembl	ENSG00000089009	n/a
UniProt	Q02878	n/a
RefSeq (mRNA)	NM_000970; NM_001024662; NM_001320137; NM_001320138; NM_001320139 NM_001320140; NM_001320141; NM_001320142	XM_036156129
RefSeq (protein)	NP_000961; NP_001019833; NP_001307066; NP_001307067; NP_001307068 NP_001307069; NP_001307070; NP_001307071	n/a
Location (UCSC)	Chr 12: 112.41 – 112.42 Mb	n/a
PubMed search
- Wikidata
View/Edit Human	View/Edit Mouse

60S ribosomal protein L6 is a protein that in humans is encoded by the RPL6 gene.

Ribosomes, the organelles that catalyze protein synthesis, consist of a small 40S subunit and a large 60S subunit. Together these subunits are composed of 4 RNA species and approximately 80 structurally distinct proteins. This gene encodes a ribosomal protein that is a component of the 60S subunit. The protein belongs to the L6E family of ribosomal proteins. It is located in the cytoplasm. The protein can bind specifically to domain C of the tax-responsive enhancer element of human T-cell leukemia virus type 1, and it has been suggested that the protein may participate in tax-mediated transactivation of transcription. As is typical for genes encoding ribosomal proteins, there are multiple processed pseudogenes of this gene dispersed through the genome. Two alternatively spliced transcript variants encoding the same protein have been found for this gene.

== Interactions ==
RPL6 has been shown to interact with Basic fibroblast growth factor.
