= Plasma membrane transformation =

The plasma membrane transformation is a concept introduced by Christopher R. Murphy of The University of Sydney to encapsulate the idea that a series of changes in the plasma membrane of uterine epithelial cells is essential to the development of the receptivity of the uterus (womb) for the attachment of the blastocyst (fertilized egg) and the beginning of a pregnancy.

Originally advanced in 1993 (Murphy 1993) and subsequently elaborated in 1994 (Murphy and Shaw 1994), the concept has gained widespread acceptance as a useful way to understand the changes in the epithelial cells lining the uterus as they progress towards becoming receptive for blastocyst implantation.

Subsequent reviews in 2000 and 2004 elaborated on the concept which has been extended to encompass all placental animals with live birth.
