= Fibroblast growth factor 2 =

Growth factor and signaling protein otherwise known as FGF2

FGF2
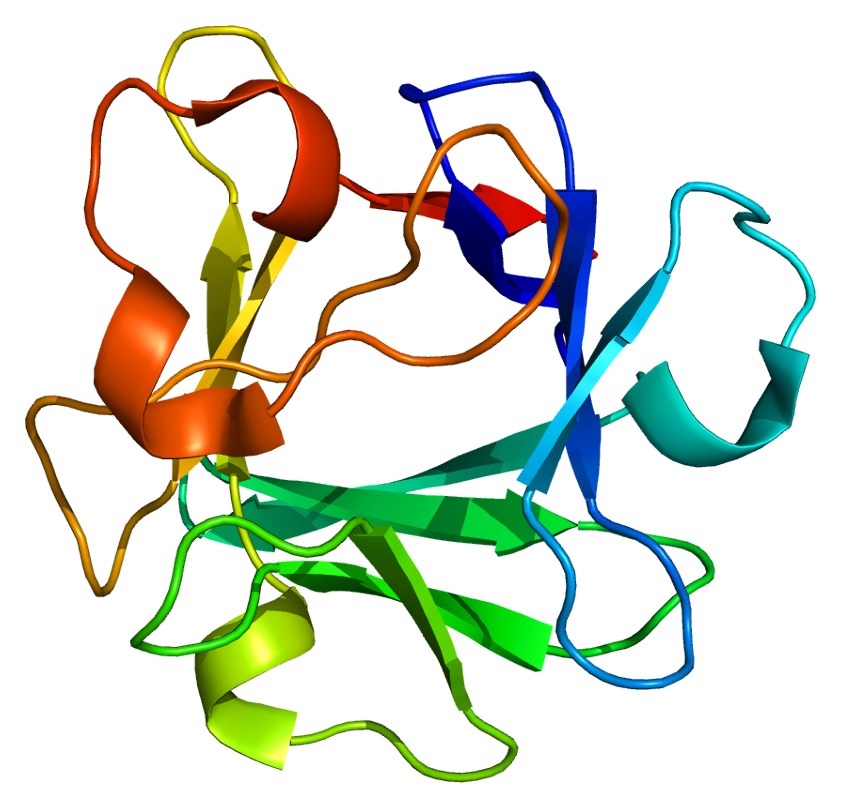

Identifiers
- Aliases: FGF2, BFGF, FGF-2, FGFB, HBGF-2, fibroblast growth factor 2
- External IDs: OMIM: 134920; MGI: 95516; GeneCards: FGF2
Available structures
PDB	Ortholog search: PDBe RCSB
PDB	List of PDB id codes 1BAS, 1BFB, 1BFC, 1BFF, 1BFG, 1BLA, 1BLD, 1CVS, 1EV2, 1FGA, 1FQ9, 1II4, 1IIL, 2BFH, 2FGF, 2M49, 4FGF, 4OEE, 4OEF, 4OEG

Gene location (Human)
Chr.	Chromosome 4 (human)
Band	4q28.1	Start	122,826,708 bp
Band	4q28.1	End	122,898,236 bp

Gene location (Mouse)
Chr.	Chromosome 3 (mouse)
Band	3 B|3 18.41 cM	Start	37,402,495 bp
Band	3 B|3 18.41 cM	End	37,464,257 bp
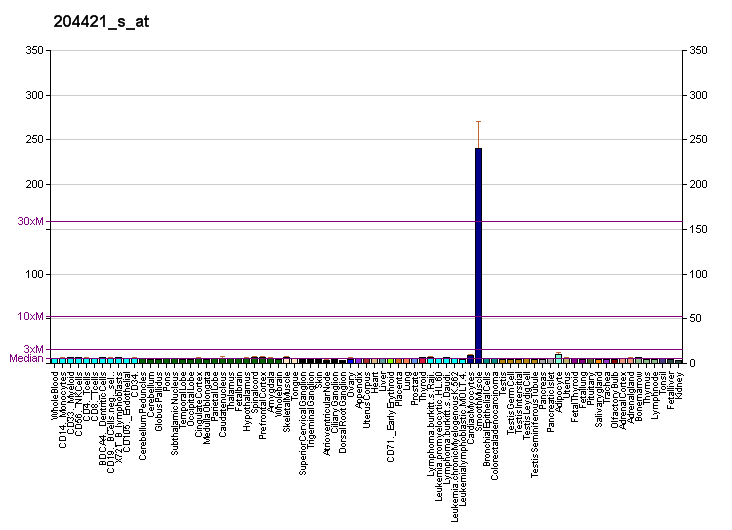

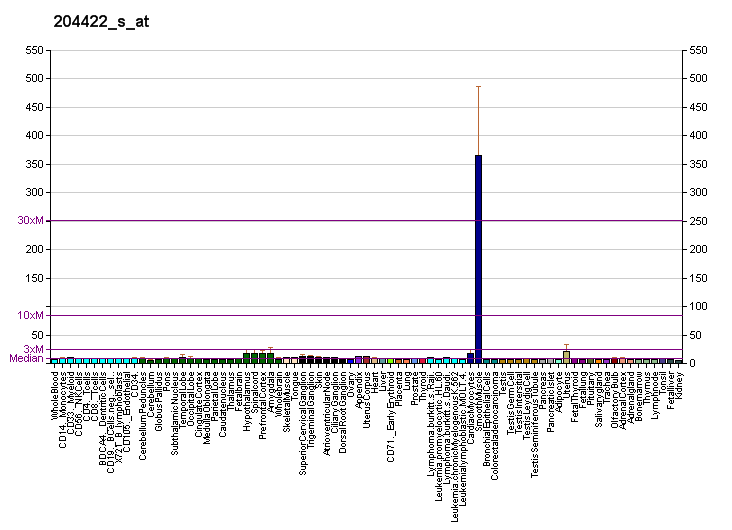
RNA expression pattern
Bgee	Human / Mouse (ortholog); Top expressed in: cartilage tissue; Epithelium of choroid plexus; Achilles tendon; smooth muscle tissue; stromal cell of endometrium; Descending thoracic aorta; adipose tissue; retinal pigment epithelium; subcutaneous adipose tissue; muscle layer of sigmoid colon / Top expressed in: ascending aorta; aortic valve; vas deferens; efferent ductule; ankle; decidua; gastrula; epididymis; carotid body; esophagus; More reference expression data
BioGPS	More reference expression data
Gene ontology
Molecular function	cytokine activity; heparin binding; fibroblast growth factor receptor binding; protein binding; nuclear receptor coactivator activity; chemoattractant activity; growth factor activity; protein tyrosine kinase activity; phosphatidylinositol-4,5-bisphosphate 3-kinase activity; 1-phosphatidylinositol-3-kinase activity; receptor-receptor interaction; integrin binding
Cellular component	extracellular region; nucleus; extracellular space
Biological process	release of sequestered calcium ion into cytosol; cell differentiation; negative regulation of fibroblast migration; hyaluronan catabolic process; positive regulation of endothelial cell proliferation; positive regulation of MAP kinase activity; negative regulation of blood vessel endothelial cell migration; positive regulation of endothelial cell chemotaxis to fibroblast growth factor; somatic stem cell population maintenance; positive regulation of phospholipase C activity; extracellular matrix organization; wound healing; negative regulation of cell death; regulation of angiogenesis; nervous system development; cell migration involved in sprouting angiogenesis; MAPK cascade; positive regulation of angiogenesis; positive regulation of phosphatidylinositol 3-kinase activity; positive regulation of transcription, DNA-templated; chemotaxis; fibroblast growth factor receptor signaling pathway; chondroblast differentiation; multicellular organism development; growth factor dependent regulation of skeletal muscle satellite cell proliferation; branching involved in ureteric bud morphogenesis; positive regulation of cardiac muscle cell proliferation; embryonic morphogenesis; angiogenesis; positive regulation of cell fate specification; animal organ morphogenesis; regulation of endothelial cell chemotaxis to fibroblast growth factor; phosphatidylinositol biosynthetic process; inositol phosphate biosynthetic process; negative regulation of wound healing; Ras protein signal transduction; positive regulation of cell division; signal transduction; positive regulation of transcription by RNA polymerase II; positive chemotaxis; phosphatidylinositol phosphate biosynthetic process; peptidyl-tyrosine phosphorylation; positive regulation of sprouting angiogenesis; positive regulation of cell population proliferation; phosphatidylinositol-3-phosphate biosynthetic process; stem cell proliferation; regulation of signaling receptor activity; positive regulation of protein kinase B signaling; cytokine-mediated signaling pathway; positive regulation of blood vessel endothelial cell migration; positive regulation of ERK1 and ERK2 cascade; positive regulation of vascular associated smooth muscle cell proliferation; positive regulation of vascular endothelial cell proliferation; positive regulation of cell migration involved in sprouting angiogenesis; paracrine signaling; positive regulation of DNA biosynthetic process; positive regulation of endothelial cell chemotaxis
Sources:Amigo / QuickGO
Orthologs
Databases	NCBI: entry; OMA: entry
Species	Human	Mouse
Entrez	2247	14173
Ensembl	ENSG00000138685	ENSMUSG00000037225
UniProt	P09038	P15655
RefSeq (mRNA)	NM_002006; NM_001361665	NM_008006
RefSeq (protein)	NP_001997; NP_001348594	NP_032032
Location (UCSC)	Chr 4: 122.83 – 122.9 Mb	Chr 3: 37.4 – 37.46 Mb
PubMed search
- Wikidata
View/Edit Human	View/Edit Mouse

Fibroblast growth factor 2 (FGF-2), also known as basic fibroblast growth factor (bFGF) and FGF-β, is a growth factor and signaling protein encoded by the FGF2 gene. It binds to and exerts effects via specific fibroblast growth factor receptor (FGFR) proteins, themselves a family of closely related molecules. Fibroblast growth factor protein was first purified in 1975; soon thereafter three variants were isolated: 'basic FGF' (FGF2); Heparin-binding growth factor-2; and Endothelial cell growth factor-2. Gene sequencing revealed that this group is the same FGF2 protein and is a member of a family of FGF proteins.

== Function ==
Like other FGF family members, basic fibroblast growth factor possesses broad mitogenic and cell survival activities, and is involved in a variety of biological processes, including embryonic development, cell growth, morphogenesis, tissue repair, tumor growth and invasion.

In normal tissue, bFGF is present in basement membranes and in the subendothelial extracellular matrix of blood vessels. It stays membrane-bound as long as there is no signal peptide.

It has been hypothesized that, during both wound healing of normal tissues and tumor development, the action of heparan sulfate-degrading enzymes activates bFGF, thus mediating the formation of new blood vessels, a process known as angiogenesis.

In addition, it is synthesized and secreted by human adipocytes and the concentration of FGF2 correlates with the BMI in blood samples. It was also shown to act on preosteoblasts – in the form of an increased proliferation – after binding to fibroblast growth factor receptor 1 and activating phosphoinositide 3-kinase.

FGF2 has been shown in preliminary animal studies to protect the heart from injury associated with a heart attack, reducing tissue death and promoting improved function after reperfusion.

Evidence has shown that low levels of FGF-2 play a key role in the incidence of excessive anxiety.

Additionally, FGF-2 is a critical component of human embryonic stem cell culture medium; the growth factor is necessary for the cells to remain in an undifferentiated state, although the mechanisms by which it does this are poorly defined. It has been demonstrated to induce gremlin expression which in turn is known to inhibit the induction of differentiation by bone morphogenetic proteins. It is necessary in mouse-feeder cell dependent culture systems, as well as in feeder and serum-free culture systems. FGF-2, in conjunction with BMP4, promote differentiation of stem cells to mesodermal lineages. After differentiation, BMP4 and FGF2 treated cells generally produce higher amounts of osteogenic and chondrogenic differentiation than untreated stem cells. However, a low concentration of bFGF (10 ng/mL) may exert an inhibitory effect on osteoblast differentiation. The nuclear form of FGF2 functions in mRNA export

FGF-2 is synthesized primarily as a 155 amino acid polypeptide, resulting in an 18 kDa protein. However, there are four alternate start codons which provide N-terminal extensions of 41, 46, 55, or 133 amino acids, resulting in proteins of 22 kDa (196 aa total), 22.5 kDa (201 aa total), 24 kDa (210 aa total) and 34 kDa (288 aa total), respectively. Generally, the 155 aa/18 kDa low molecular weight (LMW) form is considered cytoplasmic and can be secreted from the cell, whereas the high molecular weight (HMW) forms are directed to the cell's nucleus.

Since its first isolation from the bovine pituitary, FGF2 has become a prominent signaling protein studied in bovine reproduction. It has been found in cumulus cells that surround the oocyte and evidence on such early reproductive function indicates FGF2 may promote meiotic resumption and prevent cumulus cell apoptosis. FGF2 is also produced by the uterine epithelium, secreted into the lumen, and acts on the developing embryo and conceptus. Work in mice previously established that FGF2 plays a role in primitive endoderm (PE) development. Research with bovine embryos has since noted this same phenomenon. Extended blastocyst cultures with FGF2-supplemented media observed that FGF2 increases PE outgrowths via proliferation. Knockout models of the FGF receptor and its kinase activity appears to alter the cellular expression of NANOG and GATA4 (transcription factors essential for proper cell differentiation and embryonic development), indicating a specific role of FGF2 in PE specification and subsequent blastocyst development rates. Culture media supplemented with combinations of FGF2, EGF and IGF2 have found similar results and indicate that FGF2 may activate the AKT pathway for trophoblastic cell line growth. Together, this showcases the key roles FGF2 plays in bovine embryo development, as similarly described in other mammalian species.

== Interactions ==
Fibroblast growth factor 2 has been shown to interact with casein kinase 2, alpha 1, RPL6, ribosomal protein S19 and API5.

== See also ==
- Angiogenesis
- Anxiety disorders
- Cytokine
- Fibroblast growth factor
- Growth factor
- Proteases in angiogenesis
- Receptor (biochemistry)
- Signal transduction
