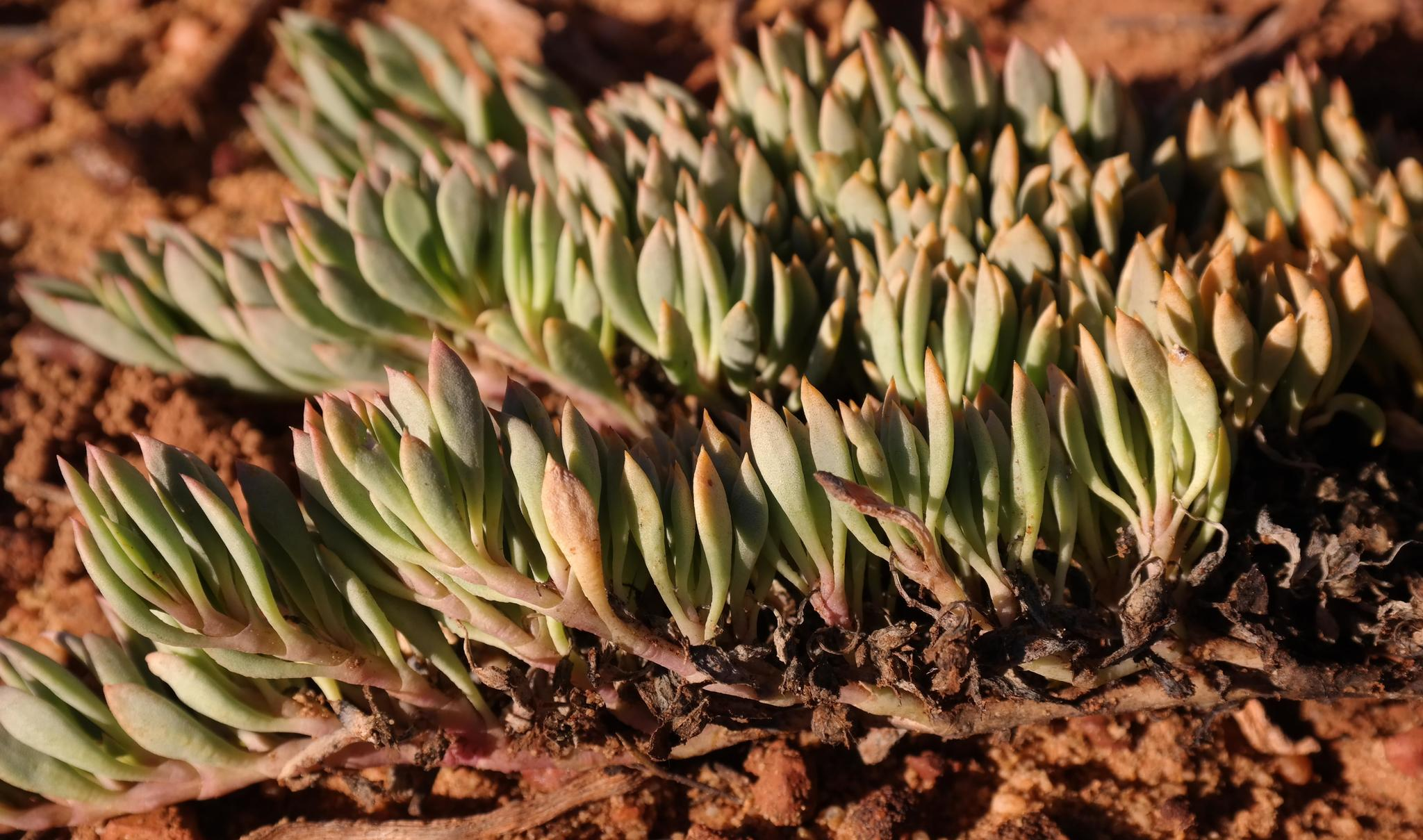

Scientific classification
- Kingdom: Plantae
- Clade: Tracheophytes
- Clade: Angiosperms
- Clade: Eudicots
- Order: Caryophyllales
- Family: Aizoaceae
- Genus: Acrosanthes
- Species: A. anceps

Binomial name
- Acrosanthes anceps (Thunb.) Sond.

Synonyms
- Acrosanthes fistulosa Eckl. & Zeyh.; Aizoon fistulosum (Eckl. & Zeyh.) D.Dietr.; Trianthema anceps Thunb.

= Acrosanthes anceps =

South African plant species

Acrosanthes anceps is a species of plant from South Africa.

== Description ==
This sprawling shrublet has trailing branches. It grows to a height of 10 cm (3.9 in). The fleshy leaves are lance-shaped end in an abruptly point and have a somewhat pointed base.

White flowers are present between September and November. They are solitary and grow from the nodes. Each flower has between 15 and 30 stamens.

== Distribution and habitat ==
This species is endemic to the Northern Cape and Western Cape of South Africa. It grows on stony sandstone slopes between Piketberg, Clanwilliam and Goudini.
