= Assisted zona hatching =

Assisted reproductive technology procedure

Assisted zona hatching is a procedure of assisted reproductive technology, mainly used in IVF, which assists zona hatching. To achieve this a small hole is made in the zona pellucida (mechanically, chemically or by laser) to facilitate hatching. Zona hatching is where the blastocyst gets rid of the surrounding zona pellucida to be able to implant in the uterus.

== Efficacy ==
A systematic review and meta-analysis came to the result that assisted zona hatching is related to increased rates of clinical pregnancy and multiple pregnancy in women with previous repeated failure or frozen-thawed embryos. However, it is unlikely to increase clinical pregnancy rates when performed in fresh embryos transferred to unselected women, to those without poor prognosis or to women of advanced maternal age. Also, overall, there no evidence of a significant difference in live birth rate following assisted hatching compared with no assisted hatching.

== Indications ==
Sometimes, some embryos have a thickened or deformed zona pellucida that makes it difficult for them to come out and, therefore, can lead to implantation failures. To avoid this, this technique can be used. Assisted hatching is not routinely done in all laboratories. It is recommended in some cases:

• Patients of advanced age (37 years or more)

• Implantation failure

• Anomalous zona pellucida (thick, partitioned,...)

• Thawed embryos since vitrification produces a hardening of the zona pellucida.

• Embryos with slow development. For example, when on day 3 they have less than 6 cells.

• To do a blastocyst biopsy

Those embryos biopsied to make PGD (preimplantation genetic diagnosis) will already have the hole made and, therefore, will hatch easily once they reach the stage of expanded blastocysts.

== Methods ==
Mechanical assisted hatching: involves the use of micromanipulation techniques by using a needle. The zona pellucida is pierced with a needle and drilled by friction against a pipette. It is a technique that is rarely used because of the risk it has of damaging the embryo. It is also called "partial zona dissection".

Chemical assisted hatching: involves the use of specialized solutions (mostly acid, e.g. thyroid acid) in order to degrade the zona pellucida. Because it can be toxic for the embryo, it needs to be washed.

"Laser assisted hatching" (LHA): a high energy laser is used to create an opening in the zona pellucida, it is the most precise technique and safe for the embryo but it is the most expensive one.
