= Choriovitelline placenta =

Type of placenta found in marsupials and some placental mammals

Details
- Gives rise to: Early placental attachment in some mammals
- System: Reproductive system

A choriovitelline placenta is a placenta formed by the yolk sac and chorion. In a choriovitelline placenta, the yolk sac fuses with the chorion and, subsequently, wrinkles develop that hold the embryo to the uterine wall, thus forming the choriovitelline placenta. The chorionic blood vessels are connected with the vitelline blood vessel of the yolk sac.

Because the yolk sac is formed earlier than the allantois in embryo development, a choriovitelline placenta can form earlier than the chorioallantoic placenta. All marsupials maintain a choriovitelline placenta. (However, bandicoots also have a chorioallantoic placenta.) Primates do not form any choriovitelline placenta. However, this is not to say the existence of a choriovitelline placenta is a "primitive" feature: many placental mammals, including pig, horse, and ruminants, form a choriovitelline placenta in early development before the chorioallantoic placenta forms and the choriovitelline placenta is resorbed. Rodents and some other mammals first form a choriovitelline placenta then form a chorioallantoic placenta, but both types are maintained throughout gestation.
