= Pinopode =

Pinopodes (also known as pinopods and uterodomes) are protrusions on the apical cellular membrane of uterine epithelial cells.

Pinopodes have a pinocytotic role (hence the name pinopode - Greek for "drinking foot"), as well as a secretory role. Their secretory vacuoles reach towards the lumen; The contents within the vesicle may provide necessary nutrients to the embryo. This feature also assists in its ability to attach to the uterine endometrium. With the development of pinipodes, there is a decrease in epithelial cell contact, which prompts blastocyst attachment and penetration.

The usefulness of pinopodes as a marker for endometrial receptivity has been debated in past literature, but is now generally accepted.

== Structure and morphology ==
Pinopodes are usually measured to be 5–10 μm. Their structure is dependent upon the organism's current stage of the menstrual cycle, as pinopodes are regulated by the sex hormones, estrogen and progesterone. Studies in the rat have shown that progesterone stimulates the development of pinopodes, while estrogen is responsible for their regression.

Generally, the first developmental stage occurs during the early luteal phase, around days 17-18 of the menstrual cycle. During this time, cellular bulging appears. The second mid-luteal stage of development, around days 20-22, is when the pinopodes are most prominent. During this peak phase, their structures look spherical and smooth, without microvilli. Towards the end of the secretory phase, around days 23-35, the regression period occurs. In this stage, the structure shrivels and appears wrinkly. Not every pinopode on the endometrial surface develops at the same time, affecting the consistency of distribution along the membrane.

F-actin is found within pinopodes. The cytoskeleton is mainly made up of actin microfilaments. The structure varies between species. In rodents, pinopodes contain many vacuoles; Human pinopodes do not contain large vacuoles but have secretory vesicles, a rough endoplasmic reticulum, and a golgi apparatus. Mitochondria and glycogen have been found in both rodent and human pinopodes.

== Endometrial receptivity ==
Previous literature had questioned the validity of the pinopodes' role in endometrial receptivity and implantation. However, more recent literature has found correlations between the presence of pinopodes and endometrial receptivity. Women undergoing in-vitro fertilization with a high presence of pinopodes are more likely to have higher embryo implantation and pregnancy rates when compared to women with low pinopode coverage. The implantation window is known as the period of time in which the endometrium is receptive to blastocyst attachment. Due to pinopode development overlapping with the implantation window, blastocyst attachment takes place, which provides adhesion molecules necessary for the implantation process. Current trials and research have shown pinopodes to be a reliable endometrial receptivity marker.
