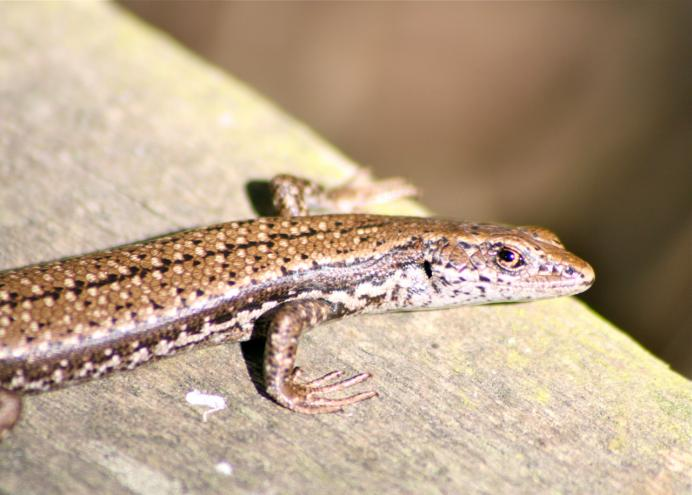

Conservation status
- Least Concern (IUCN 3.1)

Scientific classification
- Kingdom: Animalia
- Phylum: Chordata
- Class: Reptilia
- Order: Squamata
- Family: Scincidae
- Genus: Pseudemoia
- Species: P. entrecasteauxii

Binomial name
- Pseudemoia entrecasteauxii (A.M.C. Duméril & Bibron, 1839)
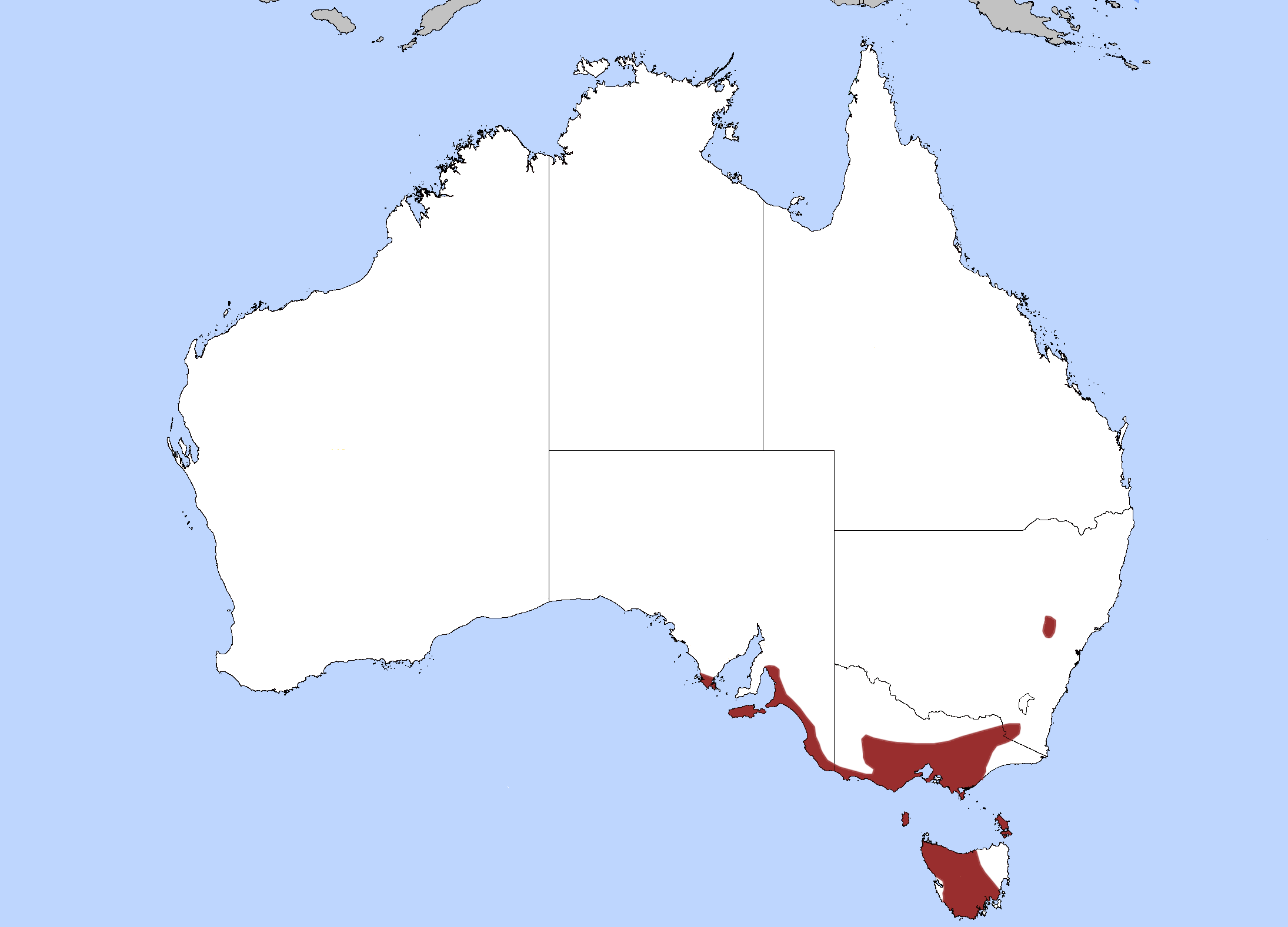
- Distribution of the southern grass skink

Synonyms
- Lygosoma entrecasteauxii A.M.C. Duméril & Bibron, 1839; Leilopisma entrecasteauxi — Greer, 1974; Claireascincus entrecasteauxii — Wells & Wellington, 1985; Pseudemoia entrecasteauxii — Hutchinson et al., 1990; Niveoscincus entrecasteauxii — Bauer et al., 1995

= Pseudemoia entrecasteauxii =

Species of lizard

Pseudemoia entrecasteauxii, also known commonly as Entrecasteaux's skink, the southern grass skink, the tussock cool-skink, and the tussock skink, is a species of lizard in the family Scincidae. The species is endemic to Australia.

== Geographic range ==
P. entrecasteauxii is found in the south-east of the continent of Australia, as well as in Tasmania and the islands of Bass Strait.

== Habitat ==
Although it occurs in a variety of habitats, P. entrecasteauxii is most commonly found in open grassy woodlands.

== Longevity ==
The southern grass skink has a lifespan of about 5 or 6 years.

== Description ==
P. entrecasteauxii grows up to 7.5 cm (3.0 in) in length (not including the tail). Male skinks change colouration during the breeding season.

== Etymology ==
The specific name, entrecasteauxii, is in honor of French naval officer and explorer Antoine Bruni d'Entrecasteaux.

== Reproductive biology ==
The southern grass skink has become a model species for reproductive biology in reptiles because it gives birth to live young and exhibits non-invasive epitheliochorial placentation. Unlike the majority of live bearing reptiles, Pseudemoia develop complex placentae, which provide a substantial amount of nutrients to the embryo through pregnancy. Pregnancy in squamates is supported by the evolution of a novel state of gene regulation. The amount of nutrients provided is dependent on the amount of food females consume during pregnancy, and, unlike other live-bearing reptiles, scarcity of food during pregnancy can cause developmental failure. When food is limiting, females will also cannibalize their offspring. Together, these results suggest that placental nutrient transport may only be a successful mode of reproduction if food is abundant throughout pregnancy, which may limit its opportunities to evolve in some reptiles. Lipid transport in this species most likely occurs through the yolk sac placenta and is facilitated in part by the production of the protein lipoprotein lipase. The first observation of an extra-uterine pregnancy in a reptile was found in this species. The extra-uterine embryo did not invade maternal tissue, suggesting fundamental differences between the nature and evolution of placentation in the southern grass skink and eutherian mammals.
