= Apoptosis inhibitor 5 =

Protein found in humans

API5

Identifiers
- Aliases: API5, AAC-11, AAC11, apoptosis inhibitor 5
- External IDs: OMIM: 609774; MGI: 1888993; GeneCards: API5
Available structures
PDB	Ortholog search: PDBe RCSB
PDB	List of PDB id codes 3U0R, 3V6A

Gene location (Human)
Chr.	Chromosome 11 (human)
Band	11p12	Start	43,311,963 bp
Band	11p12	End	43,344,529 bp

Gene location (Mouse)
Chr.	Chromosome 2 (mouse)
Band	2|2 E1	Start	94,242,027 bp
Band	2|2 E1	End	94,268,481 bp
RNA expression pattern
Bgee	Human / Mouse (ortholog); Top expressed in: islet of Langerhans; rectum; ventricular zone; superficial temporal artery; oocyte; parotid gland; endometrium; ganglionic eminence; mucosa of paranasal sinus; cecum / Top expressed in: primitive streak; cumulus cell; external carotid artery; maxillary prominence; retinal pigment epithelium; ureter; ciliary body; lacrimal gland; internal carotid artery; conjunctival fornix; More reference expression data
BioGPS	n/a
Gene ontology
Molecular function	fibroblast growth factor binding; protein binding; RNA binding
Cellular component	cytoplasm; spliceosomal complex; membrane; nucleus; nuclear speck
Biological process	negative regulation of fibroblast apoptotic process; negative regulation of apoptotic process; apoptotic process
Sources:Amigo / QuickGO
Orthologs
Databases	NCBI: entry; OMA: entry
Species	Human	Mouse
Entrez	8539	11800
Ensembl	ENSG00000166181	ENSMUSG00000027193
UniProt	Q9BZZ5	O35841
RefSeq (mRNA)	NM_001142930; NM_001142931; NM_001243747; NM_006595	NM_007466; NM_001305258; NM_001349003
RefSeq (protein)	NP_001136402; NP_001136403; NP_001230676; NP_006586	NP_001292187; NP_031492; NP_001335932
Location (UCSC)	Chr 11: 43.31 – 43.34 Mb	Chr 2: 94.24 – 94.27 Mb
PubMed search
- Wikidata
View/Edit Human	View/Edit Mouse

Apoptosis inhibitor 5 is a protein that in humans is encoded by the gene API5.

This protein is an apoptosis inhibitory protein whose expression prevents apoptosis after growth factor deprivation. This protein suppresses the transcription factor E2F1-induced apoptosis and also interacts with, and negatively regulates acinus, a nuclear factor involved in apoptotic DNA fragmentation. Its depletion enhances the cytotoxic action of chemotherapeutic drugs. Crystal structure of API5 exhibits the function for protein-protein interaction

Diseases associated with API5 include colon adenocarcinoma and cervical cancer.

API5 functions in nuclear export of mRNA.
