= Uterine epithelium =

Details
- Location: Uterus
- Function: Epithelium

The internal surface of the uterus is lined by uterine epithelial cells which undergo dramatic changes during pregnancy. The role of the uterine epithelial cells is to selectively allow the blastocyst to implant at a specific time (the time of implantation). All other times of the cycle, these uterine epithelial cells are refractory to blastocyst implantation. Uterine epithelial cells have a similar structure in most species and the changes which occur in the uterine epithelial cells at the time of blastocyst implantation are also conserved among most species.

== Structure ==
The cytoplasm of uterine epithelial cells contains typical organelles found in other cells, including a nucleus, which is located towards the bottom of the cell with one or more prominent nucleoli, mitochondria, golgi apparatus, endoplasmic reticulum, free ribosomes, lysosomes, vesicles and lipid droplets. Like all epithelial cells, the uterine epithelial cells lie on a basal lamina.

=== Apical plasma membrane ===
The apical plasma membrane displays compositional variations that change at the time of implantation. The apical domain is specialized for the initial interaction with the embryo as well as controlling secretory and absorptive processes including endocytosis and pinocytosis. The apical surface of the uterine epithelial cells is covered with microvilli that are under hormonal control and vary in length and number with the oestrous cycle and during pregnancy. A hormonally dependent glycocalyx is found outside the microvilli while the center of the microvilli consists of an actin filament core which is embedded into the terminal web. The terminal web is a meshwork of actin filaments, which lies immediately below the microvilli and is important in maintaining the structural integrity of the cell surface as well as acting as a barrier to movement of cellular organelles.

=== Lateral plasma membrane ===
The lateral plasma membrane domain is responsible for cell adhesion and is believed to control the paracellular transport of fluid and electrolytes, that is transport of fluid between the cells. A junctional complex characterises this domain and consists of three specialized areas; the zonula occludens (tight junction), zonula adherens (adherens junction) and macula adherens (desmosome). The zonula occludens and zonula adherens form a continuous belt around the cell that provides a barrier to paracellular transport and are thought to be important in cell-cell communication.

=== Basal plasma membrane ===
The basal domain is essential for adhesion between the epithelium and underlying stroma as well as possible communication between these two regions. The uterine epithelial cells produce the basal lamina on which they rest. The basal lamina is composed of two regions; the lamina lucida that is an electron lucent layer adjacent to the basal plasma membrane and the lamina densa that is a closely packed network of fibers.

== Changes at implantation ==
There are dramatic changes in the morphology and biochemical characteristics of the uterine epithelial cells in preparation for blastocyst implantation. These features include a loss of apical microvilli such that the apical plasma membrane becomes flattened. There is also a decrease in the amount of glycocalyx covering the apical surface which leads to a reduction in the negative charge of the uterine epithelial cells. Collectively, these plasma membrane changes have been termed the plasma membrane transformation. Changes in the lateral junctional complex are important in the regulation of fluid movement along the paracellular pathway, between the epithelial cells.

=== Tight junction changes during early pregnancy ===
During the early stages of pregnancy, prior to implantation, the tight junction complex, which is the main regulator of paracellular flow, extends 0.4 μm down the lateral plasma membrane with little cross-linking of the tight junctional strands. At this time, the tight junctions are quite 'leaky' allowing movement of fluid and solutes between the epithelial cells.

At the time of implantation the tight junctions extended further down the lateral plasma membrane (1 μm) and there was a significant increase in the cross-linking of the tight junctional strands. At the time of implantation the tight junctions are electrochemically 'tighter’ and prevent the movement of fluids and electrolytes between the cells. These changes were also found in ovariectomised rats treated with exogenous hormones. Animals treated with oestrogen displayed a picture of tight junctions similar to that seen on day 1 of pregnancy while rats treated with either progesterone alone or in combination with oestrogen had tight junctions with similar morphology to that seen at the time of implantation. Various components of the tight junctions regulate the selectivity of this paracellular pathway. For example, it has been shown that it is the claudin component of tight junctions regulates the charge selectivity of the tight junctions.

== Fluid transport across cells ==
At the time of implantation in a number of species the uterine lumen closes down, which allows uterine epithelial cells to come into contact with each other and ‘fixes’ the blastocyst in place. Uterine closure involves mild generalised oedema and reabsorption of luminal fluid. Fluid absorption could occur through one or a combination of mechanisms; escape of uterine fluid through the cervix, which is unlikely, as this would have the potential to displace implanting blastocysts; endocytosis by pinopods, which develop at the time of attachment, or by transcellular means. This is influenced by the tight junction molecules and ion/water channels in the apical plasma membrane of uterine epithelial cells.

Studies have found an increase in claudin-4 within the tight junctions of uterine epithelial cells at the time of implantation and an increase in ENaC in the apical membrane of uterine epithelial cells. The increase in claudin-4 prevents the movement of Na+ ions between the cells, and the appearance of ENaC in the apical membrane allows movement of Na+ ions through the cell, from the lumen into the underlying stroma. There is also an increase in AQP5 in the apical plasma membrane of uterine epithelial cells at time of implantation. The osmotic gradient created by the reabsorption of Na+ ions leads to reabsorption of water through AQP5 channels in the apical plasma membrane, which causes the uterine epithelial cells to come into contact with each other and the blastocyst.
