= PDGFRB =

Protein-coding gene in humans

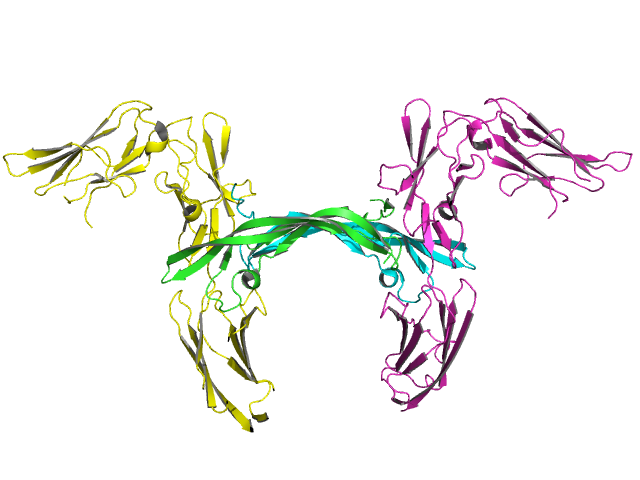

Identifiers
- Aliases: PDGFRB, CD140B, IBGC4, IMF1, JTK12, PDGFR, PDGFR-1, PDGFR1, KOGS, PENTT, platelet derived growth factor receptor beta
- External IDs: OMIM: 173410; MGI: 97531; GeneCards: PDGFRB
Available structures
PDB	Ortholog search: PDBe RCSB
PDB	List of PDB id codes 1GQ5, 1H9O, 1SHA, 2L6W, 2PLD, 2PLE, 3MJG
Enzyme activity
EC #	BRENDA	ExPASy	KEGG	MetaCyc
2.7.10.1	↗	↗	↗	↗

Gene location (Human)
Chr.	Chromosome 5 (human)
Band	5q32	Start	150,113,839 bp
Band	5q32	End	150,155,872 bp

Gene location (Mouse)
Chr.	Chromosome 18 (mouse)
Band	18 E1|18 34.41 cM	Start	61,178,222 bp
Band	18 E1|18 34.41 cM	End	61,218,133 bp
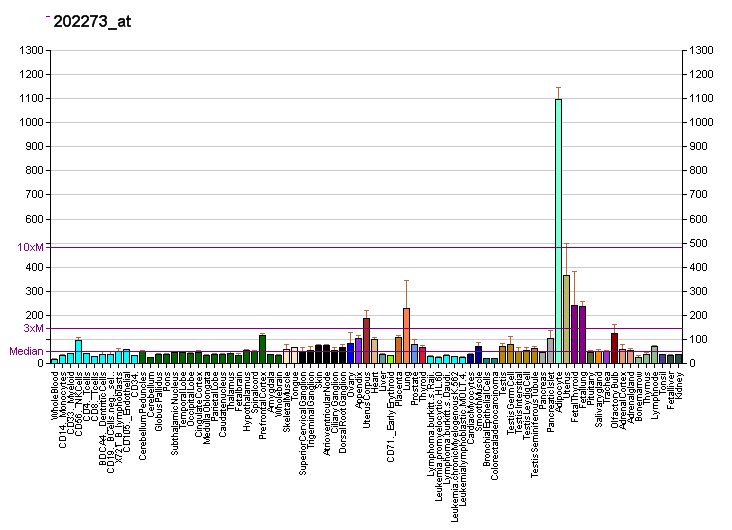
RNA expression pattern
Bgee	Human / Mouse (ortholog); Top expressed in: stromal cell of endometrium; right coronary artery; canal of the cervix; tibial arteries; gallbladder; Descending thoracic aorta; right ovary; Achilles tendon; right lung; left coronary artery / Top expressed in: external carotid artery; internal carotid artery; tunica media of zone of aorta; calvaria; epithelium of lens; left lung lobe; vas deferens; body of femur; dermis; ascending aorta; More reference expression data
BioGPS	More reference expression data
Gene ontology
Molecular function	vascular endothelial growth factor binding; kinase activity; platelet-derived growth factor-activated receptor activity; transmembrane receptor protein tyrosine kinase activity; signaling receptor binding; ATP binding; protein kinase activity; platelet-derived growth factor binding; platelet activating factor receptor activity; transferase activity; platelet-derived growth factor receptor binding; protein binding; protein tyrosine kinase activity; protein kinase binding; platelet-derived growth factor beta-receptor activity; nucleotide binding; phosphatidylinositol 3-kinase binding; phosphatidylinositol-4,5-bisphosphate 3-kinase activity; enzyme binding
Cellular component	cytoplasm; membrane; focal adhesion; nucleus; apical plasma membrane; lysosome; extracellular exosome; integral component of membrane; plasma membrane; lysosomal lumen; intrinsic component of plasma membrane; cytoplasmic vesicle; cell surface; Golgi apparatus; integral component of plasma membrane; intracellular membrane-bounded organelle; receptor complex
Biological process	positive regulation of MAP kinase activity; positive regulation of phospholipase C activity; cell migration involved in vasculogenesis; cardiac myofibril assembly; positive regulation of smooth muscle cell migration; protein phosphorylation; response to lipid; positive regulation of phosphoprotein phosphatase activity; positive regulation of reactive oxygen species metabolic process; metanephric glomerular mesangial cell proliferation involved in metanephros development; positive regulation of ERK1 and ERK2 cascade; cell chemotaxis; inner ear development; metanephric S-shaped body morphogenesis; positive regulation of mitotic nuclear division; platelet-derived growth factor receptor-beta signaling pathway; positive regulation of collagen biosynthetic process; phosphatidylinositol metabolic process; transmembrane receptor protein tyrosine kinase signaling pathway; cell migration involved in coronary angiogenesis; metanephric comma-shaped body morphogenesis; positive regulation of chemotaxis; positive regulation of DNA biosynthetic process; protein autophosphorylation; platelet-derived growth factor receptor signaling pathway; response to toxic substance; positive regulation of metanephric mesenchymal cell migration by platelet-derived growth factor receptor-beta signaling pathway; regulation of actin cytoskeleton organization; response to retinoic acid; phosphorylation; response to hyperoxia; retina vasculature development in camera-type eye; metanephric glomerulus morphogenesis; metanephric mesenchymal cell migration; wound healing; cellular response to platelet-derived growth factor stimulus; negative regulation of apoptotic process; response to fluid shear stress; response to estrogen; chemotaxis; metanephric mesenchyme development; response to hydrogen peroxide; positive regulation of smooth muscle cell proliferation; response to estradiol; intracellular signal transduction; response to organic cyclic compound; smooth muscle cell chemotaxis; positive regulation of cell migration; aorta morphogenesis; MAPK cascade; positive regulation of phosphatidylinositol 3-kinase activity; metanephric glomerular capillary formation; multicellular organism development; positive regulation of calcium ion import; glycosaminoglycan biosynthetic process; positive regulation of cell population proliferation; positive regulation of cell proliferation by VEGF-activated platelet derived growth factor receptor signaling pathway; positive regulation of phosphatidylinositol 3-kinase signaling; peptidyl-tyrosine phosphorylation; cell migration; signal transduction; positive regulation of Rho protein signal transduction; G protein-coupled receptor signaling pathway; phosphatidylinositol phosphate biosynthetic process; positive regulation of hepatic stellate cell activation; positive regulation of fibroblast proliferation; positive regulation of apoptotic process; ageing; male gonad development; lung growth; negative regulation of platelet-derived growth factor receptor-beta signaling pathway; phosphatidylinositol-mediated signaling; positive regulation of protein kinase B signaling; hematopoietic progenitor cell differentiation; positive regulation of MAPK cascade
Sources:Amigo / QuickGO
Orthologs
Databases	NCBI: entry; OMA: entry
Species	Human	Mouse
Entrez	5159	18596
Ensembl	ENSG00000113721	ENSMUSG00000024620
UniProt	P09619	P05622
RefSeq (mRNA)	NM_002609; NM_001355016; NM_001355017	NM_001146268; NM_008809
RefSeq (protein)	NP_002600; NP_001341945; NP_001341946	NP_001139740; NP_032835
Location (UCSC)	Chr 5: 150.11 – 150.16 Mb	Chr 18: 61.18 – 61.22 Mb
PubMed search
- Wikidata
View/Edit Human	View/Edit Mouse

Platelet-derived growth factor receptor beta is a protein that in humans is encoded by the PDGFRB gene. Mutations in PDGFRB are mainly associated with the clonal eosinophilia class of malignancies.

== Gene ==
The PDGFRB gene is located on human chromosome 5 at position q32 (designated as 5q32) and contains 25 exons. The gene is flanked by the genes for granulocyte-macrophage colony-stimulating factor and Colony stimulating factor 1 receptor (also termed macrophage-colony stimulating factor receptor), all three of which may be lost together by a single deletional mutation thereby causing development of the 5q-syndrome. Other genetic abnormalities in PDGFRB lead to various forms of potentially malignant bone marrow disorders: small deletions in and chromosome translocations causing fusions between PDGFRB and any one of at least 30 genes can cause Myeloproliferative neoplasms that commonly involve eosinophilia, eosinophil-induced organ injury, and possible progression to aggressive leukemia (see below).

== Structure ==
The PDGFRB gene encodes a typical receptor tyrosine kinase, which belongs to the type III tyrosine kinase receptor (RTK) family and is structurally characterized by five extracellular immunoglobulin-like domains, a single membrane-spanning helix domain, an intracellular juxtamembrane domain, a split tyrosine kinase domain and a carboxylic tail. In the absence of ligand, PDGFRβ adopts an inactive conformation in which the activation loop folds over the catalytic site, the juxtamembrane region over a loop occluding the active site and the carboxy-terminal tail over the kinase domain. Upon PDGF binding the dimerization of receptor releases the inhibitory conformations due to auto-phosphorylation of regulatory tyrosine residues in trans fashion. Tyrosine residues 857 and 751 are major phosphorylation sites for the activation of PDGFRβ.

The molecular mass of the mature, glycosylated PDGFRβ protein is approximately 180 kDa.

== Modes of activation ==
Activation of PDGFRβ requires de-repression of the receptor's kinase activity. The ligand for PDGFRβ (PDGF) accomplishes this in the course of assembling a PDGFRβ dimer. Two of the five PDGF isoforms activate PDGFRβ (PDGF-B and PDGF-D). The activated receptor phosphorylates itself and other proteins, and thereby engages intracellular signaling pathways that trigger cellular responses such as migration and proliferation. There are also PDGF-independent modes of de-repressing the PDGFRβ's kinase activity and hence activating it. For instance, forcing PDGFRβ into close proximity of each other by overexpression or with antibodies directed against the extracellular domain. Alternatively, mutations in the kinase domain that stabilize a kinase active conformation result in constitutive activation.

Unlike PDGFRα, PDGFRβ cannot be indirectly activated. This is because PDGFRβ recruits RasGAP and thereby attenuates Ras/PI3K activity, which is required to engage a feed-forward loop that is responsible for this mode of activation.

== Role in physiology/pathology ==
The phenotype of knock out mice demonstrates that PDGFRB is essential for vascular development, and that PDGFRB is responsible for activating PDGFRβ during embryogenesis. Eliminating either PDGFRB, or PDGF-B reduces the number of pericytes and vascular smooth muscle cells, and thereby compromises the integrity and/or functionality of the vasculature in multiple organs, including the brain, heart, kidney, skin and eye.

In vitro studies using cultured cells indicate that endothelial cells secrete PDGF, which recruits PDGFRβ-expressing pericytes that stabilize nascent blood vessels. Mice harboring a single activated allele of PDGFRB show a number of postnatal phenotypes including reduced differentiation of aortic vascular smooth muscle cells and brain pericytes. Similarly, differentiation of adipose from pericytes and mesenchymal cells is suppressed. Misregulation of the PDGFRβ's kinase activity (typically activation) contributes to endemic diseases such as cancer and cardiovascular disease.

=== PDGFRB mutations ===
==== 5q- Syndrome ====
Human chromosome 5 deletions that remove three adjacent genes, those for granulocyte-macrophage colony-stimulating factor, PDGFRB, and colony stimulating factor 1 receptor, cause the chromosome 5q deletion syndrome (5q- syndrome). This syndrome is a unique type of myelodysplastic syndrome characterized by a prolonged disease course, a low rate of transformation to an aggressive form of leukemia, and an anemia which in many patients is profound, refractory to traditional therapies (e.g. iron supplements, Erythropoietin), and requiring maintenance red blood cell transfusions. The disease is treated with a chemotherapy drug, lenalidomide.

==== PDGFRB Translocations ====
Human chromosome translocations between the PDGFRB gene and at least any one of 30 genes on other chromosomes lead to myeloid and/or lymphoid neoplasms that are many ways similar to the neoplasm caused by the fusion of the PDGFRA (i.e. platelet derived growth factor receptor A or alpha-type-platelet derived growth factor receptor) gene with the FIP1L1 gene (see FIP1L1-PDGFRA fusion gene. The most common of these rare mutations is the translocation of PDGFRB gene with the ETV6 gene (also termed ETS variant gene 6).

===== PDGFRB-ETV6 translocations =====
The ETV6 gene codes for a transcription factor protein that in mice appears to be required for hematopoiesis and maintenance of the developing vascular network. The gene is located on human chromosome 12 at the p13 position, consists of 14 exons, and is well-known to be involved in a large number of chromosomal rearrangements associated with leukemia and congenital fibrosarcoma. Translocations between it and the PDGFRB gene, notated as t(5;12)(q33;p13), yield a PDGFRB-ETV6 fused gene that encodes a fusion protein, PDGFRB-ETV6. This chimeric protein, unlike the PDGFRB protein: a) has continuously active PDGFRB-mediated tyrosine kinase due to its forced dimerization by the PNT protein binding domain of the ETV6 protein; b) is highly stable due to its resistance to ubiquitin-proteasome degradation; and c) therefore over-stimulates cell signaling pathways such as STAT5, NF-κB, and extracellular signal-regulated kinases which promote cell growth and proliferation. This continuous signaling, it is presumed, leads to the development of myeloid and/or lymphoid neoplasms that commonly include increased numbers of blood born and tissue eosinophils, eosinophil-induced organ and tissue injury, and possible progression to aggressive form of leukemia.

PDGFRB-ETV6 fusion protein-induced neoplasms often present with features that would classify them as chronic myelomonocytic leukemias, juvenile myelomonocytic leukemia, atypical or Philadelphia chromosome negative chronic myeloid leukemias, myelodysplastic syndromes, acute myelogenous leukemias, or acute lymphoblastic leukemias. The disease is now classified by the World Health Organization as one form of clonal eosinophilia. It is critical that the PDGFRB-ETV6 fusion protein-driven disease be diagnostically distinguished from many of the just cited other diseases because of its very different treatment.

Patients with the PDGFRB-ETV6 fusion protein-driven disease are more often adult males but rarely children. They present with anemia, increases in blood eosinophils and monocytes, splenomegaly, and, less often, lymphadenopathy. Bone marrow examination may reveal cellular features similar to that seen in the aforementioned diseases. Diagnosis is may by conventional cytogenetic examination of blood or bone marrow cells to test for PDGFRB rearrangements using fluorescence in situ hybridization or to test for the fused FDGFRB-ATV6 fluorescence in situ hybridization and/or real-time polymerase chain reaction using appropriate nucleotide probes. These patients, unlike many patients with similarly appearing neoplasms, respond well to the tyrosine kinase inhibitor, imatinib. The drug often causes long-term complete hematological and cytogenic remissions as doses well below those used to treat chronic myelogenous leukemia. Primary or acquired drug resistance to this drug is very rare. Additional adjuvant chemotherapy may be necessary if a patient's disease is unresponsive to tyrosine kinase inhibitor therapy and/or progresses to more aggressive disease phase similar to that seen in the blast crisis of chronic myelogenous leukemia.

===== Other PDGFRB translocations =====
The PDGFRB gene has been found to fuse with at least 36 other genes to form fusion genes that encode chimeric proteins that are known or presumed to possess: a) continuously active PDGFRB-derived tyrosine kinase activity; b) the ability to continuously stimulate the growth and proliferation of hematological stem cells; and c) the ability to cause myeloid and lymphoid neoplasms that commonly but not always are associated with eosinophilia. In all instances, these gene fusion diseases are considered types of clonal eosinophilia with recommended treatment regimens very different than those of similar hematological malignancies. The genes fusing to PDGFRB, their chromosomal location, and the notations describing their fused genes are given in the following table.

Gene	locus	notation	gene	locus	notation	Gene	locus	notation	gene	locus	notation	gene	locus	notation	gene	locus	notation
TPM3	1q21	t(1;5)(q21;q32)	PDE4DIP	1q22	t(1;5)(q22;q32)	SPTBN1	2p16	t(2;5)(p16;q32)	GOLGA4	3p21-25	t(3;5)(p21-25;q31-35)	WRD48	3p21-22	t(1;3;5)(p36;p21;q32)	PRKG2	4q21	t(4;5)(p21;q32)
CEP85L	6q22	t(5;6)(q32;q22)	HIP1	7q11	t(5;7)(q32;q11)	KANK1	9q24	t(5;9)(q32;q24)	BCR	9q34	t(5;9)(q32;q34)	CCDC6	10q21	t(5;10)(q32;q21	H4(D10S170)	10q21.2	t(5;10)(q32;q21.2)
GPIAP1	11p13	multiple	ETV6	12p13	t(5;12)q32;p13)	ERC1	12p13.3	t(5;12)(q32;p13.3)	GIT2	12q24	t(5;12)(q31-33;q24)	NIN	14q24	t(5;14)(q32;q24	TRIP11	14q32	t(5;14)(q32;q32)
CCDC88C	14q32	t(5;14)(q33;q32)	TP53BP1	15q22	t(5;15)q33;22)	NDE1	16p13	t(5;16)(q33;p13)	SPECC1	17p11	t(5;17)(q32;p11.2)	NDEL1	17p13	t(5;17)(q32;p13)	MYO18A	17q11.2	t(5;17)(q32;q11.2)
BIN2	12q13	t(5;12)(q32;q13)	COL1A1	17q22	t(5;17)q32;q22)	DTD1	20p11	t(5;20)(q32;p11)	CPSF6	12q15	t(5;12)(q32;q15)	RABEP1	17p13	t(5;17)(q32;p13)	MPRIP	17p11	t(5;17)(q32;p11)
SPTBN1	2p16	t(5;2)(q32;p16)	WDR48	3p22	t(5;3)q32;p22)	GOLGB1	3q12	t(3;5)(q12;q32)	DIAPH1	5q31	t(5;5)(q32;q31)	TNIP1	5q33	t(5;5)(q32;q33)	SART3	12q23	t(5;12)(q32;q23)

Similar to PDGFRB-ETV6 translocations, these translocations are generally in-frame and encode for fusion proteins with their PDGFRB-derived tyrosine kinase being continuously active and responsible for causing the potentially malignant growth of its myeloid and/or lymphoid harboring cells. Patients are usually middle-aged men. They commonly present with anemia, eosinophilia, monocytosis, and splenomegaly and have their disease classified as chronic myelomonocytic leukemia, atypical chronic myelomonocytic leukemia, juvenile myelomonocytic leukemia, myelodysplastic syndrome, acute myelogenous leukemia, acute lymphoblastic leukemia, or T-lymphoblastic lymphoma. Diagnosis relies on cytogenetic analyses to detect breakpoints in the long arm of chromosome 5 by fluorescence in situ hybridization. These patients usually respond well to imatinib therapy.

===== Primary familial brain calcification =====
Primary familial brain calcification (see Fahr's syndrome) is a rare disease involving bilateral calcifications in the brain, predominantly in basal ganglia but also cerebellum, thalamus, and brainstem in patients presenting with diverse neurologic (e.g. movement disorders, parkinsonism, seizures, headache) features and psychiatric (e.g. cognitive impairment, mood disorders, psychotic symptoms, and obsessive-compulsive) disturbances. In a minority of cases, the disease is associated with apparent autosomal dominant loss of function mutations in PDGFRB or the gene which encodes a ligand that simulates PDGFRB, Platelet-derived growth factor, PDGFB. PDGFRB is extensively expressed in the neurons, chorioid plexus, vascular smooth muscle cells, and pericytes of the human brain, particularly the basal ganglia and the dentate nucleus. It is proposed that signal transduction through PDGFRB maintains blood–brain barrier integrity and that loss of the PDGFRB receptor or its ligand, PDGFB, disrupts the blood–brain barrier, subsequently promoting (peri)vascular calcium deposition and thereby causing the dysfunction and death of neurons.

== Interactions ==
PDGFRB has been shown to interact with:

- CRK,
- Caveolin 1,
- Grb2,
- NCK1,
- NCK2,
- PDGFR-α,
- PTPN11,
- RAS p21 protein activator 1,
- SHC1 and
- Sodium-hydrogen antiporter 3 regulator 1.

== See also ==
- Cluster of differentiation
- Platelet-derived growth factor receptor
- Kosaki overgrowth syndrome
