= Clonal hypereosinophilia =

Group of blood-based disorders

Clonal hypereosinophilia, also termed primary hypereosinophilia or clonal eosinophilia, is a grouping of hematological disorders all of which are characterized by the development and growth of a pre-malignant or malignant population of eosinophils, a type of white blood cell that occupies the bone marrow, blood, and other tissues. This population consists of a clone of eosinophils, i.e. a group of genetically identical eosinophils derived from a sufficiently mutated ancestor cell.

The clone of eosinophils bear a mutation in any one of several genes that code for proteins that regulate cell growth. The mutations cause these proteins to be continuously active and thereby to stimulate growth in an uncontrolled and continuous manner. The expanding population of eosinophils initially formed in the bone marrow may spread to the blood and then enter into and injure various tissues and organs.

Clinically, clonal eosinophilia resembles various types of chronic or acute leukemias, lymphomas, or myeloproliferative hematological malignancies. However, many of the clonal hypereosinophilias are distinguished from these other hematological malignancies by the genetic mutations which underlie their development and, more importantly, by their susceptibility to specific treatment regimens. That is, many types of these disorders are remarkably susceptible to relatively non-toxic drugs.

== Background ==
Hematopoietic stem cells give rise to: 1) myeloid precursor cells that differentiate into red blood cells, mast cells, blood platelet-forming megakaryocytes, or myeloblasts, which latter cells subsequently differentiate into white blood cells viz., neutrophils, basophils, monocytes, and eosinophils; or 2) lymphoid precursor cells which differentiate into T lymphocytes, B lymphocytes, or natural killer cells. Malignant transformation of these stem or precursor cells results in the development of various hematological malignancies. Some of these transformations involve chromosomal translocations or Interstitial deletions that create fusion genes. These fusion genes encode fusion proteins that continuously stimulate cell growth, proliferation, prolonged survival, and/or differentiation. Such mutations occur in hematological stem cells and/or their daughter myeloid precursor and lymphoid precursor cells; commonly involve genes that encode tyrosine kinase proteins; and cause or contribute to the development of hematological malignancies. A classic example of such a disease is chronic myelogenous leukemia, a neoplasm commonly caused by a mutation that creates the BCR-ABL1 fusion gene (see Philadelphia chromosome). The disease is due to conversion of the tightly regulated tyrosine kinase of ABL1 protein to being unregulated and continuously active in the BCR-ABL1 fusion protein. This Philadelphia chromosome positive form of chronic myelogenous leukemia used to be treated with chemotherapy but nonetheless was regarded as becoming lethal within 18–60 months of diagnosis. With the discovery of the uncontrolled tyrosine kinase activity of this disorder and the use of tyrosine kinase inhibitors. Philadelphia chromosome positive chronic myelogenous leukemia is now successfully treated with maintenance tyrosine kinase inhibiting drugs to achieve its long-term suppression.

Some hematological malignancies exhibit increased numbers of circulating blood eosinophils, increased numbers of bone marrow eosinophils, and/or eosinophil infiltrations into otherwise normal tissues. These malignancies were at first diagnosed as eosinophilia, hypereosinophilia, acute eosinophilic leukemia, chronic eosinophilic leukemia, other myeloid leukemias, myeloproliferative neoplasm, myeloid sarcoma, lymphoid leukemia, or non-Hodgkin lymphomas. Based on their association with eosinophils, unique genetic mutations, and known or potential sensitivity to tyrosine kinase inhibitors or other specific drug therapies, they are now in the process of being classified together under the term clonal hypereosinophilia or clonal eosinophilia. Historically, patients suffering the cited eosinophil-related syndromes were evaluated for causes of their eosinophilia such as those due to allergic disease, parasite or fungal infection, autoimmune disorders, and various well-known hematological malignancies (e.g. Chronic myelogenous leukemia, systemic mastocytosis, etc.) (see causes of eosinophilia). Absent these causes, patients were diagnosed in the World Health Organization's classification as having either 1) Chronic eosinophilic leukemia, not otherwise specified, (CEL-NOS) if blood or bone marrow blast cells exceeded 2% or 5% of total nucleated cells, respectively, and other criteria were met or 2) idiopathic hypereosinophilic syndrome (HES) if there was evidence of eosinophil-induced tissue damage but no criteria indicating chronic eosinophilic leukemia. Discovery of genetic mutations underlining these eosinophilia syndromes lead to their removal from CEL-NOS or HES categories and classification as myeloid and lymphoid neoplasms associated with eosinophilia and abnormalities of PDGFRA, PDGFRB, FGFR1, and, tentatively, PCMA-JAK2. Informally, these diseases are also termed clonal hypereosinophilias. New genetic mutations associated with, and possibly contributing to the development of, eosinophilia have been discovered, deemed to be causes of clonal eosinophilia, and, in certain cases, recommended for inclusion in the category of myeloid and lymphoid neoplasms associated with eosinophilia and abnormalities of PDGFRA, PDGFRB, FGFR1, and, tentatively, PCMA-JAK2. Many of the genetic causes for clonal eosinophilia are rare but nonetheless merit attention because of their known or potential sensitivity to therapeutic interventions that differ dramatically form the often toxic chemotherapy used to treat more common hematological malignancies.

== Genetics, clinical presentation, and treatment ==
Clonal hypereosinophilia derives from Germline mutations in genes that are involved in the development and/or maturation of hematopoietic stem cells and/or their myeloid or lymphoid descendants. In general, these mutations cause the mutated genes to form protein products that, unlike their natural counterparts, are less susceptible to inhibition: the mutant proteins continuously stimulate precursor cells to grow and proliferate while failing to differentiate and therefore result in, or at least are associated with, malignancies which have features dominated by myeloid, lymphoid, or both types of hematological malignancies. In most but not all instances, the resulting malignancies are associated with increases in blood, bone marrow, and/or tissue eosinophil levels as well as one or more of the signs, symptoms, tissue injuries, and organ dysfunctions (e.g. eosinophilic myocarditis) associated with the hypereosinophilic syndrome. The World Health Organization in 2015 included in their classification of eosinophilia disorders the category "Myeloid and lymphoid neoplasms associated with eosinophilia and abnormalities of PDGFRA, PDGFRB, and FGFR1" genes. This was updated in 2016 to include a provisional entity, a specific translocation mutation of the JAK2 gene that forms the PCM1-JAK2 fusion gene. These mutation-associated eosinophilic neoplasms as well as some recently discovered mutations that give rise clonal hypereosinophilias are described in the following sections.

=== World Health Organization-identified clonal hypereosinophilias ===
==== PDGFRA-associated eosinophilic neoplasms ====
===== Genetics =====
PDGFRA-associated eosinophilic neoplasms are the most common forms of clonal eosinophilia, accounting for some 40% to 50% of all cases. The PDGFRA gene encodes the platelet-derived growth factor receptor A (PDGFRA) which is a cell surface, RTK class III Receptor tyrosine kinase. PDGFRA, through its tyrosine kinase activity, contributes to the growth, differentiation, and proliferation of cells. Chromosome translocations between the PDGFRA gene and either the FIP1L1, KIF5B, CDK5RAP2, STRN, ETV6, FOXP1, TNKS2, BCR or JAK2 gene create a fusion gene which codes for a chimeric protein consisting of the tyrosine kinase portion of PDGFRA and a portion of these other genes. The fusion protein has uninhibited tyrosine kinase activity and thereby is continuously active in stimulating cell growth, prolonged survival (by in inhibiting cell death), and proliferation.

===== Clinical presentation and treatment =====
Patients with the cited PDGFRA fusion genes are overwhelmingly male (30:1 male to female ratio). They may present with cutaneous and/or pulmonary allergic symptoms, mucosal ulcers, splenomegaly, current or history of thrombosis events, and the most serious complication, cardiac dysfunction, which occurs in 20% to 30% of patients. The serious complications of eosinophilic myocarditis causing heart failure and arrhythmia and the pathological formation of blood clots causing the occlusion of diverse blood vessels occur often in, and may be part of the presentation of, this clonal eosinophilia. Patient laboratory findings are compatible with the findings seen in a) eosinophilia, hypereosinophilia, the hypereosinophilic syndrome, chronic eosinophilic leukemia, or acute eosinophilic leukemia; b) myeloproliferative neoplasm/myeloblastic leukemia associated with little or no eosinophilia; c) T-lymphoblastic leukemia/lymphoma associated with eosinophilia; d) myeloid sarcoma associated with eosinophilia (see FIP1L1-PDGFRA fusion genes); or e) combinations of these presentations. Variations in the type of malignancy formed likely reflect the specific type(s) of hematopoietic precursor cells that bear the mutation.

PDGFRA fusion gene-induced diseases generally respond well to the first line treatment drug, tyrosine kinase inhibitor, imatinib. If no hematological response is observed within 4 weeks of imatinib, primary resistance should be considered. This resistance is linked to the occurrence of a S601P mutation in PDGFRA. Acquired resistance to imatinib have in most cases been in association with the T674I mutation of FIP1L1-PDGFRA. Second generation tyrosine kinase inhibitors, e.g. bosutinib, sorafenib, and nilotinib, show little success in treating T674I FIP1L-PDGFRA mutations leaving allogeneic stem cell transplantation as the treatment of choice for patients suffering such mutations. Third generation tyrosine kinase inhibitors with in vivo efficacy for inhibiting PDGFRA kinase activity are in development.

==== PDGFRB-associated eosinophilic neoplasms ====
===== Genetics =====
The PDGFRB gene encodes the platelet-derived growth factor receptor B (PDGFRB) which, like PDGFRA, is a cell surface, RTK class III Receptor tyrosine kinase. PDGFRA, through its tyrosine kinase activity, contributes to the growth, differentiation, and proliferation of cells. Chromosome translocations between the PDGFRB gene and either the CEP85L, HIP1, KANK1, BCR, CCDC6, H4D10S170), GPIAP1, ETV6, ERC1, GIT2, NIN, TRIP11, CCDC88C TP53BP1, NDE1, SPECC1, NDEL1, MYO18A, BIN2, COL1A1, DTD1 CPSF6, RABEP1, MPRIP, SPTBN1, WDR48, GOLGB1, DIAPH1, TNIP1, or SART3 gene create a fusion gene which codes for a chimeric protein consisting of the tyrosine kinase portion of PDGFRB and a portion of the other cited genes. The fusion protein has uninhibited tyrosine kinase activity and thereby continuously stimulates cell growth and proliferation.

===== Clinical presentation and treatment =====
Patients with the cited PDGFRB fusion genes generally present with a combination of eosinophilia and monocytosis, increased bone marrow eosinophils, and/or eosinophil tissue infiltrations but otherwise a disease resembling chronic myelomonocytic leukemia, atypical chronic myelogenous leukemia, juvenile myelomonocytic leukemia, myelodysplastic syndrome, acute myelogenous leukemia, acute lymphoblastic leukemia, or T lymphoblastic lymphoma. These patients usually respond well to imatinib or other tyrosine kinase inhibitor therapy.

==== FGFR1-associated eosinophilic neoplasms ====
===== Genetics =====
FGFR1 is the gene for the fibroblast growth factor receptor 1, a cell surface receptor that similar to PDGFRA and PDGFRB, is tyrosine kinase receptor. In some rare hematological cancers, the fusion of the FGFR1 gene with certain other genes due to Chromosomal translocations or Interstitial deletions create fusion genes that encode chimeric FGFR1 Fusion proteins that have continuously active FGFR1-derived tyrosine kinase activity and thereby continuously stimulate cell growth and proliferation. These mutations occur in the early stages of myeloid and/or lymphoid cell lines and are the cause of or contribute to the development and progression of certain types of leukemia, Myelodysplastic syndromes, and lymphomas which are commonly associated with greatly increased numbers of circulating blood eosinophils (i.e. hypereosinophilia) and/or increased numbers of bone marrow eosinophils. These neoplasmas are sometimes termed, along with certain other Myelodysplastic syndromes associated with eosinophilia as myeloid neoplasms with eosinophilia, clonal eosinophilia, or primary eosinophilia. They have also been termed 8p11 myeloproliferative syndromes based on the chromosomal location of the FGFR1 gene on human chromosome 8 at position p11 (i.e. 8p11). The fusion gene partners of FGFR1 causing these neoplasms include: MYO18A, CPSF6, TPR, HERV-K, FGFR1OP2, ZMYM2, CUTL1, SQSTM1, RANBP2, LRRFIP1, CNTRL, FGFR1OP, BCR, NUP98, MYST3, and CEP110.

===== Clinical presentation and treatment =====
As detailed in FGFR1 Hematological cancers, patients with the cited FGFR1 fusion genes usually evidence hematological features of the myeloproliferative syndrome with moderate to greatly elevated levels of blood and bone marrow eosinophils. Less commonly and dependent upon the exact gene to which FBGFR1 is fused, patients may present with hematological features of T-cell lymphomas which may have spread to non-lymphoid tissues; chronic myelogenous leukemias; or chronic myelomonocytic leukemia with involvement of tonsils. Some of these patients may present with little or no eosinophilia features but because of the underlying genetic mutation and its therapeutic implications are still regarded having clonal eosinophilia. Because the FGFR1 gene is located on human chromosome 8 at position p11, hematological diseases associated with the cited FGFR1 gene fusions are sometimes termed the 8p11 myeloproliferative syndrome.

FGFR1 fusion gene-associated hematological diseases are aggressive, rapidly progressive, and, in general, do not respond to first generation tyrosine kinase inhibitors. Two newer generation tyrosine kinase inhibitors, sorafenib and midostaurin, have had only transient and/or minimal effects in treating the disease. Currently, treatment with chemotherapy agents followed by bone marrow transplantion has been used to improve survival. The tyrosine kinase inhibitor Ponatinib has been used as mono-therapy and subsequently used in combination with intensive chemotherapy to treat the myelodysplasia caused by the FGFR1-BCR fusion gene.

==== PCM1-JAK2 -associated eosinophilic neoplasms ====
The JAK2 gene encodes a member of the Janus kinase family of non-receptor tyrosine kinase, JAK2. The JAK2 protein associates with the cytoplasmic tails of various cytokine and growth factor receptors that reside on the cell surface and regulate Haematopoiesis, i.e. the development and growth of blood cells. Examples of such receptors include the erythropoietin receptor, Thrombopoietin receptor, granulocyte colony-stimulating factor receptor, Granulocyte macrophage colony-stimulating factor receptor, Interleukin-3 receptor, Interleukin-5 receptor, Interleukin-6 receptor, and the receptor Thymic stromal lymphopoietin, which is a complex composed of the CRLF2 receptor combined with alpha chain of the IL-7 receptor. JAK2 protein's association with these receptors is responsible for a) correctly targeting and positioning these receptors at the cell surface and b) indirectly activating critical cell signaling pathways including in particular the STAT family of transcription factors which are involved in promoting the growth, proliferation, differentiation, and survival of the myeloid and lymphoid precursor cells that populate the bone marrow, other blood cell forming tissues, and the blood. The PCM1 gene codes for the PCM1 protein, i.e. pericentriolar material 1. The PCM1 protein exhibits a distinct cell cycle-dependent association with the centrosome complex and microtubules; it is critical for the normal cell cycle and cell division (see PCM1).

===== Genetics =====
Acquired mutations in early hematopoietic stem cells involving the JAK2 gene, located on human chromosome 8 at position p22 (i.e. 8p22), and the PCM1 gene, located at 12p13, create the PCM1-JAK2 fusion gene. This fusion gene encodes the chimeric PCMI-JAK2 fusion protein which has continuously active JAK2-associated tyrosine kinase and therefore continuously phosphorylates tyrosine residues on the cytoplasmic tail of the cell surface receptor to which it is attached. In consequence, the receptor remains continuously active in attracting docking proteins such as SOS1 and STAT proteins which drive cell growth, proliferation, and survival.

===== Clinical presentation and treatment =====
PCM1-JAK2 gene positive patients present with features of myeloid neoplasms, lymphoid neoplasms, or features of both types of neoplasms. Most commonly, the present with features of myeloid neoplasms with 50–70% of cases associated with eosinophilia and/or bone marrow fibrosis Their disease usually progresses rapidly from a chronic phase to an acute blast cell phase resembling chronic myelogenous leukemia's conversion form chronic to acute phases. Rarely, the acute phase of PCM1-JAK2 gene positive disease resembles a lymoblastic leukemia. PCM1-JAK2-induced hematological malignances are rare and relatively newly discovered. The disease is aggressive and therefore has been treated aggressively with chemotherapy followed by bone marrow transplantation. However, of 6 patients treated with a tyrosine kinase inhibitor, ruxolitinib, 5 experienced complete remissions and have survived for at least 30 months. One patient relapsed after 18 months ruxolitinib therapy and required Hematopoietic stem cell transplantation (HSCT). The efficacy of ruxolitinib therapy in this therapy requires a larger study; ultimately, the drug may find use as initial single therapy or as an adjuvant to reduce tumor load prior to combination with HCST.

=== Other clonal hypereosinophilias ===
Ongoing studies continue to find patients with eosinophilia, hypereosinophilia, or other myeloid/lymphoid neoplasms that are associated with eosinophilia and that express previously unappreciated mutations in genes coding for other tyrosine kinases in bone marrow-derived cells. These cases fit the definition of clonal hypereosinophilia. The World Health Organization currently includes these mutation-related diseases in the categories of 1) idiopathic hypereosinophilia when blood and bone marrow show no increase in blast cells and there is no eosinophil-related organ damage or 2) CEL-NOS when increased numbers of blast cells occur in blood and/or bone marrow and/or eosinophil-related tissue damage is present. Further studies may allow these mutation-related diseases to be considered for inclusion in the myeloid and lymphoid neoplasms associated with eosinophilia category.

==== Other JAK2-related eosinophilias ====
===== Genetics =====
Gene fusions of JAK2 with ETV6 or BCR have been discovered in rare instances of eosinophilia-associated hematological diseases. The product of the ETV6 gene is a member of the ETS transcription factor family; it is required for hematopoiesis and maintenance of the developing vascular network, as determined in mouse Gene knockout. ETV6 is located on human chromosome 12 at position p13.2; chromosome translocation between it and JAK2 located on human chromosome 9 at position p24.1 form the fusion gene t(9;12)(p24;13) which encodes the ETV6-JAK2 fusion protein. Forced expression of this fusion protein in mice causes a fatal mixed myeloid and/or T-cell lymphoproliferative disorder. BCR encodes the breakpoint cluster region protein. This protein possess Serine/threonine-specific protein kinase activity and also has GPAase activating effects on RAC1 and CDC42 but its normal function is unclear. BCR is located on human chromosome 22 at position q11.23. Translocations between it and JAK2 create the t(9;22)(p24;q11) fusion gene which codes for the BCR-JAK2 fusion protein. Forced expression of BCR-JAK2 in mice induces a fatal myeloid neoplasm involving splenomegaly, megakaryocyte infiltration, and leukocytosis. It is assumed but not yet fully proven that the Malignant transformation effects of these two fusion proteins are due to the effects of a presumptively continuously active JAK2-associated tyrosine kinase. Rare patients with hypereosinophilia carry a somatic point mutation in the JAK2 gene which encodes for the amino acid phenylalanine (notated as F) instead of valine (notated as V) at position 617 of JAK2 protein. This V617F mutation render's the protein's tyrosine kinase continuously active and results in a myeloproliferative neoplasm with eosinophilia.

===== Clinical presentation and treatment =====
The clinical presentation of patients suffering ETV6-JAK2 or BCR-JAK2 fusion gene-associated disease is similar to that occurring in PCM1-JAK2-associated eosinophilic neoplasm. Like the latter neoplasm, hematologic neoplasms cause by ETV6-JAK2 and BCR-JAK2 are aggressive and progress rapidly. Too few patients with the latter fusion proteins have been treated with tyrosine kinase inhibitors to define their efficacy. One patient with BCR-JAK-related disease obtained a complete remission with ruxolitinib therapy that lasted 24 months but then required Hematopoietic stem cell transplantation (HSCT); a second patient wit this mutation failed treatment with dasatinib and also required HSCT. Patients bearing the V617F mutation exhibited features of a myleproliferative neoplasm. Treated with imatinib, they exhibited some hematological improvement.

==== ABL1-related eosinophilias ====
===== Genetics =====
The ABL1 gene encodes a non-receptor tyrosine kinase termed Abelson murine leukemia viral oncogene homolog 1. Among its numerous effects on cellular function, the ABL1 kinase- regulates cell proliferation and survival pathways during development. It mediates at least in part the cell proliferating signaling stimulated by PDGF receptors as well as by antigen receptors on T cell and B cell lymphocytes. The ABL1 gene is located on human chromosome 9q34.12; translocations between it and the BCR gene on human chromosome 22q11.23 create the well-known t(9;22)(q34;q11) BCR-ABL1 fusion gene responsible for Philadelphia chromosome positive chronic myelogenous leukemia and chronic lymphocytic leukemia. While BCR-ABL1 fusion gene-induce leukemias are sometimes accompanied by eosinophilia, they are not regarded as clonal hypereosinophilias since other features of these leukemias dominate. However, translocations between ABL1 and the ETV6 gene, located on human chromosome 12p13.2 creates the t(9;13)(q34;p13) ETV6-ABL1 fusion gene. This fusion gene is regarded as continuously active in drive hematological cell proliferation leading to clonal hypereosinophilia.

===== Clinical presentation and treatment =====
Patients with ETV6-ABL1 fusion gene-positive disease present with various hematological disorders. Children present predominantly with hematological findings similar to acute lymphocytic leukemia and less commonly with findings of acute myelogenous leukemia or chronic variants of these two leukemias. Adults are more likely to present with findings similar to acute myelogenous leukemia or myeloproliferative neoplasms. In a study of 44 patients with this fusion gene, eosinophilia was found in all patients with myelogenous and myeloproliferative diseases but only 4 of 13 with acute lymphocytic leukemia presentations. The prognosis was very poor in adults with acute leukemia forms of the disease; ~80% of these patients suffered fatal disease progression or relapse. Five patients with the myeloproliferative form of the disease responded to the tyrosine kinase inhibitor imatinib or sequential treatment with imatinib followed by recurrence and treatment with a second generation tyrosine kinase inhibitor nilotinib; dasatinib is also a recommended second generation tyrosine kinase inhibitor for treating the disease. Follow-up of these patients is too short to determine the overall length of time to relapse and the efficacy of single or serial tyrosine kinase inhibitor treatments. Patients with the blast cell phase of this disease have very poor responses to tyrosine kinase inhibitors and a median survival of ~1 year. Thus, tyrosine kinase inhibitors, including second-generation inhibitors, in the treatment of ETV6-ABL1-positive hematological malignancies have shown varying responses; it is suggested that further investigations into the clinical efficacy of these drugs in ETV6-ABL1-induced clonal hypereosinophilia is warranted.

==== FLT3-related eosinophilias ====
===== Genetics =====
The FLT3 gene codes for the cluster of differentiation antigen 135 (i.e. CD135) protein or FLT3 protein. This protein is a member of the class III family of receptor tyrosine kinases; PDGFRA, PDGFRB, c-KIT and CSF1R also belong to this receptor class. FLT3 protein binds and is activated by the FLT3 ligand; FLT3 protein activation involves its forming dimers, changing to an open conformation to allow access of the phosphate donor, ATP, to its binding pocket, and autophosphorylation. The activated receptor initiates cell proliferation and survival signals in various precursor blood cells types through RAS p21 protein activator 1, Phospholipase Cβ, STAT5, and extracellular signal-regulated kinases. The FLT3 gene is located on human chromosome 13q12.2. Chromosome translocations between it and ETV6 (chromosome 12p13.2), SPTBN1 (2p16.2), GOLGB1 (3q13.33), or TRIP11 (14q32.12) genes create fusion genes which, it is hypothesized, encode for fusion proteins that have continuously active FLT3 protein-related tyrosine kinase activity and thereby force the uncontrolled proliferation and survival of hematological cells.

===== Clinical presentation and treatment =====
Patients with hematological disease related to the cited FLT3 fusion genes present with either a myeloid or lymphoid neoplasm plus eosinophilia. Four of 6 patients with ETV6-FLT3-related disease, a patient with GOLGB1-FLT3-related disease, and a patient with TRIP11-FLT3-related disease presented with findings similar to T-cell lymphoma while a patient with SPTBN1-FLT3-related disease had findings of chronic myelogenous leukemia. Two patients with ETV6-FLT3-related disease experienced complete hematologic remissions when treated with a multi-kinase inhibitor, sunitinib, that has inhibitory activity against FLT3 protein. However, these remissions were short-lived. A third patient with ETV6-FLT3-related disease was treated with a similarly active kinase inhibitor, sorafenib. This patient achieved a complete hematological response and was then given a hematopoietic stem cell transplantation. The latter treatment regimen, FLT3 inhibitor followed by hematopoietic stem cell transplantation, may be the best approach currently available for treating FLT3-related hematological disease.

==== ETV6-ACSL6-related eosinophilias ====
===== Genetics =====
The ETV6 gene (also known as translocation-Ets-leukemia) is a member of the ETS transcription factor family. The gene codes for a transcription factor protein, ETV6, which acts to inhibit the expression of various genes which in mice appear to be required for normal hematopoiesis and the development and maintenance of the vascular network. The gene is located on human chromosome 12 at position p13.2 and is well-known to be involved in a large number of chromosomal rearrangements associated with leukemia and congenital fibrosarcoma. Heterozygous ETV6 germline mutations have been identified in several families with inherited thrombocytopenia, variable red blood cell macrocytosis, and hematologic malignancies, primarily B-cell acute lymphoblastic leukemia. The ACSL6 gene encodes a protein, CSL6 acyl-CoA synthetase long-chain family member 6 (or ACSL6 protein). This protein is a Long-chain-fatty-acid—CoA ligase that plays a major role in fatty acid metabolism (particularly in the brain) by charging fatty acids with Coenzyme A to form acyl-CoA. This function can not only alter fatty acid metabolism but also modulate the function of protein kinase Cs and nuclear thyroid hormone receptor. The gene is located on human chromosome 5 at position q31.1. Chromosome translocations between ETV6 and ACSL6 at different chromosome break points create various t(5:12)(q31;p13) ETV6-ACSL6 fusion genes encoding ETV6-ACSL6 fusion proteins. The functionality of ETV6-ACSL6 fusion proteins and the mechanism by which they promote clonal hypereosinophil may, based on indirect evidence in 5 case studies, relate to a loss or gain in function of the ETV6 portion of the fusion protein. However, these issues have not been fully investigated or defined. Two cases involving ETV6-ACSL6 fusion genes were associated with the ectopic and uncontrolled expression of Interleukin 3. The gene for interleukin 3 is close to the ACSL6 gene at position 5q31 and could also be mutated during at least some ETV6-ACSL6 translocation events. Interleukin 3 stimulates the activation, growth, and survival of eosinophils and therefore its mutation could be involved in the clonal hypereosinophilia occurring in ETV6-ACSL6-related disease.

===== Clinical presentation and treatment =====
Most patients with ETV6-ACSL6-related disease present with findings similar to eosinophilia, hypereosinophilia, or chronic eosinophilic leukemia; at least 4 cases presented with eosinophilia plus findings of the red blood cell neoplasm, polycythemia vera; three cases resembled acute myelogenous leukemia; and one case presented with findings of a combined Myelodysplastic syndrome/myeloproliferative neoplasm. Best treatments for ETV6-ACSL6-related disease are unclear. Patients with the polycythemia vera form of the disease have been treated by reducing the circulating red blood cell load by phlebotomy or suppressing red blood cell formation using hydroxyurea. Individual case studies report that ETV6-ACSL6-associated disease is insensitive to tyrosine kinase inhibitors. Best treatment currently available, therefore, may involve chemotherapy and bone marrow transplantion.

== Eosinophilia associated with other hematological diseases ==
Lymphocyte-variant hypereosinophilia is a rare disease in which eosinophilia is caused by aberrant T cell lymphocytes which secrete cytokines (e.g. interleukin-5) that stimulate the proliferation of eosinophil precursor cells. The disease, which occasionally proceeds to a malignant lymphocytic phase, clearly reflects a clonal disturbance in lymphocytes, not eosinophils, and therefore is not a clonal hypereosinophilia. Similar non-clonal eosinophilia due to eosinophil precursor cell stimulation by clonal malignant cells is sometimes seen in cases of Hodgkin disease, B-cell lymphoma, T-cell lymphomas, T cell leukemias, and Langerhans cell histiocytosis. Other hematological diseases are associated with eosinophilia but regarded as clonal eosinophilia associated with a more important clonal malignancy in another cell type. For example, eosinophilia occurs in 20% to 30% of patients with systemic mastocytosis. Also referred to as SM-eo (systemic mastocytosis with eosinophilia) or SM-SEL (systemic mastocytosis with chronic eosinophilic leukemia), this disease's clonal eosinophils bear the same driving mutation, D816V in the KIT gene, as the clonal mast cells.
