= Eosinophilia =

Excess number of eosinophil cells in the blood

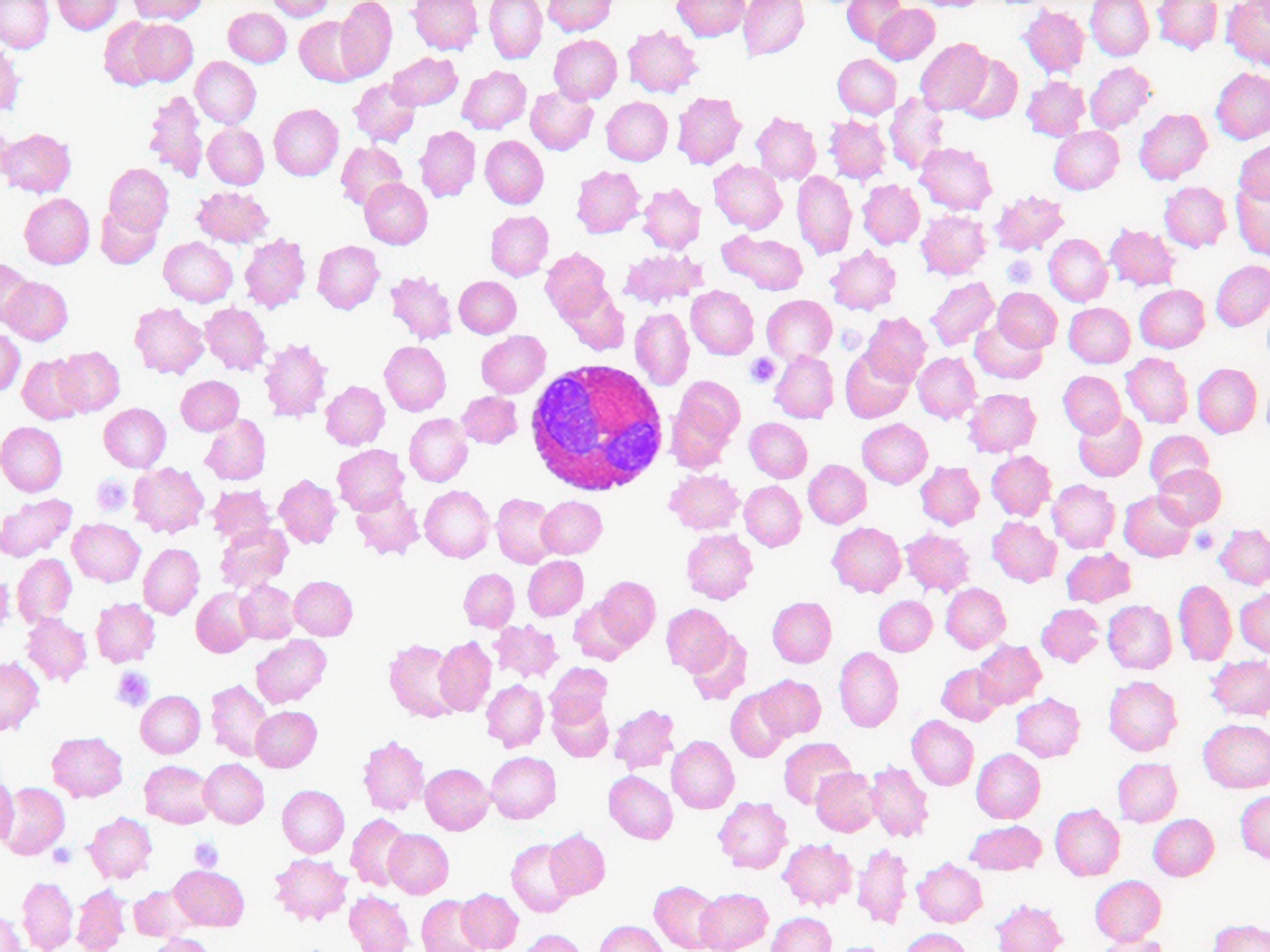
- Eosinophils in the peripheral blood of a patient with idiopathic eosinophilia
- Specialty: Infectious disease, hematology

Eosinophilia is a condition in which the eosinophil count in the peripheral blood exceeds 0.5×10^{9}/L (500/μL). Hypereosinophilia is an elevation in an individual's circulating blood eosinophil count above 1.5×10^{9}/L (1,500/μL). The hypereosinophilic syndrome is a sustained elevation in this count above 1.5×10^{9}/L (1,500/μL) that is also associated with evidence of eosinophil-based tissue injury.

Eosinophils usually account for less than 7% of the circulating leukocytes. A marked increase in non-blood tissue eosinophil count noticed upon histopathologic examination is diagnostic for tissue eosinophilia. Several causes are known, with the most common being some form of allergic reaction or parasitic infection. Diagnosis of eosinophilia is via a complete blood count (CBC), but diagnostic procedures directed at the underlying cause vary depending on the suspected condition(s). An absolute eosinophil count is not generally needed if the CBC shows marked eosinophilia. The location of the causal factor can be used to classify eosinophilia into two general types: extrinsic, in which the factor lies outside the eosinophil cell lineage; and intrinsic eosinophilia, which denotes etiologies within the eosinophil cell line. Specific treatments are dictated by the causative condition, though in idiopathic eosinophilia, the disease may be controlled with corticosteroids. Eosinophilia is not a disorder (rather, only a sign) unless it is idiopathic.

Informally, blood eosinophil levels are often regarded as mildly elevated at counts of 500–1,500/μL, moderately elevated between 1,500 and 5,000/μL, and severely elevated when greater than 5,000/μL. Elevations in blood eosinophil counts can be transient, sustained, recurrent, or cyclical.

Eosinophil counts in human blood normally range between 100 and 500 per/μL. Maintenance of these levels results from a balance between production of eosinophils by bone marrow eosinophil precursor cells termed CFU-Eos and the emigration of circulating eosinophils out of the blood through post-capillary venules into tissues. Eosinophils represent a small percentage of peripheral blood leucocytes (usually less than 8%), have a half-life in the circulation of only 8–18 hours, but persist in tissues for at least several weeks.

Eosinophils are one form of terminally differentiated granulocytes; they function to neutralize invading microbes, primarily parasites and helminthes but also certain types of fungi and viruses. They also participate in transplant rejection, Graft-versus-host disease, and the killing of tumor cells. In conducting these functions, eosinophils produce and release on demand a range of toxic reactive oxygen species (e.g. hypobromite, hypobromous acid, superoxide, and peroxide) and they also release on demand a preformed armamentarium of cytokines, chemokines, growth factors, lipid mediators (e.g. leukotrienes, prostaglandins, platelet activating factor), and toxic proteins (e.g. metalloproteinases, major basic protein, eosinophil cationic protein, eosinophil peroxidase, and eosinophil-derived neurotoxin). These agents serve to orchestrate robust immune and inflammatory responses that destroy invading microbes, foreign tissue, and malignant cells. When overproduced and over-activated, which occurs in certain cases of hypereosinophilia and to a lesser extent eosinophilia, eosinophils may misdirect their reactive oxygen species and armamentarium of preformed molecules toward normal tissues. This can result in serious damage to such organs as the lung, heart, kidneys, and brain.

== Classification ==
Based on their causes, hypereosinophilias can be sorted into subtypes. However, cases of eosinophilia, which exhibit eosinophil counts between 500 and 1,500/μL, may fit the clinical criteria for, and thus be regarded as falling into, one of these hypereosinophilia categories: the cutoff of 1,500/μL between hypereosinophilia and eosinophilia is somewhat arbitrary. There are at least two different guidelines for classifying hypereosinophilia/eosinophilia into subtypes. The General Haematoloy and Haemato-oncology Task Forces for the British Committee for Standards in Haematology classifies these disorders into a) Primary, i.e. caused by abnormalities in the eosinophil cell line; b) Secondary, i.e. caused by non-eosinophil disorders; and c) Idiopathic, cause unknown. The World Health Organization classifies these disorders into a) Myeloid and lymphoid neoplasms with eosinophilia and abnormalities of PDGFRA, PDGFRB, or FGFR1 (i.e. high eosinophil blood counts caused by mutations in the eosinophil cell line of one of these three genes), 'b) Chronic eosinophilic leukemia, and c) the Idiopathic hypereosinophilic syndrome. In the latter classification, secondary hypereosinophilia/eosinophilia is not viewed as a true disorder of eosinophils. Here these two classifications are merged and expanded to include the many forms of secondary, i.e. reactive hypereosinophilia/eosinophilia, disorders and also includes another subtype, organ-restricted hypereosinophilias, a disorder in which eosinophil-mediated tissue damage is restricted to one organ and is often but not always associated with increased blood eosinophil counts.

=== Primary hypereosinophilia ===
Primary hypereosinophilia is due to the development of a clone of eosinophils, i.e. a group of genetically identical eosinophils derived from a significantly mutated ancestor cell. The clone may prove to be benign, pre-malignant, or overtly malignant. The fundamental driver of these hypereosinophilic (or uncommonly eosinophilic) disorders is the mutation which increases the proliferation, survival, and further mutation of cells descendant from the originally mutated cell. There are several subtypes of primary hypereosinophilia.

==== Clonal hypereosinophilia ====
Clonal hypereosinophilia is hypereosinophilia caused by a pre-malignant or malignant clone of eosinophils that bear mutations in genes for PDGFRA, PDGFRB, or FGFR1 or, alternatively, a chromosome translocation that creates the PCM1-JAK2 fusion gene. These genes code for dysfunctional protein products capable of enhancing proliferation and/or survival of their parent cells which, in consequence, become an evolving and constantly growing clone of eosinophils. These mutations are recognized by the World Health Association as causing distinct entities differing from idiopathic hypereosinophilia and the idiopathic hypereosinophilic syndrome. Presence of these clones may be associated with tissue injury but in any case suggests specific therapy be directed at reducing the size and suppressing the growth of the eosinophil clone. More recently, mutations in other genes have been described as causing a similar type of clonal hypereosinophilia but have not yet been recognized as entities distinct from idiopathic hypereosinophilia and the idiopathic hyperesoniphilic syndrome. These include gene mutations in JAK2, ABL1, and FLT2 and chromosomal translocations that create the ETV6-ACSL6 fusion gene.

==== Chronic eosinophilic leukemia (NOS) ====
Chronic eosinophilic leukemia, not otherwise specified (i.e. CEL, NOS), is a leukemia-inducing disorder in the eosinophil cell lineage that causes eosinophil blood counts greater than 1,500/μL. The most recent (2017) World health organization criteria specifically excludes from this disorder hypereosinophilia/eosinophilia associated with BCR-ABL1 fusion gene-positive chronic myeloid leukemia, polycythemia vera, essential thrombocytosis, primary myelofibrosis, chronic neutrophilic leukemia, chronic myelomonocytic leukemia, atypical chronic myelogenous leukemia, clonal eosinophilias involving gene rearrangements of PDGFRA, PDGFRB, or FGFR1, and chromosome translocations that form PCM1-JAK2, ETV6-JAK2, or BCR-JAK2 fusion genes. For this diagnosis, immature eosinophil (e.g. myeloblast) cell counts in the bone marrow and peripheral blood must be less than 20% and the chromosomal alterations (inv(16)(p13.1q22)) and t(16;16)(p13;q22) as well as other features diagnostic of acute myelogenous leukemia must be absent. The latter diagnostic features include clonal cytogenetic abnormalities and molecular genetic abnormalities diagnostic for other forms of leukemia or the presence of myeloblast counts greater than 55% in bone marrow or 2% in blood. Chronic eosinophilic leukemia may transform into acute eosinophilic or other types of acute myelogenous leukemia.

==== Familial eosinophilia ====
Familial eosinophilia is a rare congenital disorder characterized by the presence of sustained elevations in blood eosinophil levels that reach ranges diagnostic of eosinophilia or, far more commonly, hypereosinophilia. It is an autosomal dominant disorder in which genetic linkage gene mapping family studies localize the gene responsible for it to chromosome 5 at position q31–q33, between markers D5S642 and D5S816. This region contains a cytokine gene cluster which includes three genes whose protein products function in regulating the development and proliferation of eosinophils viz., interleukin 3, interleukin 5, and colony stimulating factor 2. However, no functional sequence genetic polymorphisms are found within the promoter, exons, or introns, of these genes or within the common gene enhancer for interleukin 3 or colony stimulating factor 2. This suggests that the primary defect in familial eosinophilia is not a mutation in one of these genes but rather in another gene within this chromosome area. Clinical manifestations and tissue destruction related to the eosinophilia in this disorder are uncommon: familial eosinophilia typically has a benign phenotype compared to other congenital and acquired eosinophilic diseases.

==== Idiopathic hypereosinophilia ====
Idiopathic hypereosinophilia (also termed hypereosinophilia of undetermined significance, i.e. HE_{US}) is a disorder characterized by an increase in eosinophil blood counts above 1,500/μL, as detected on at least 2 separate examinations. The disorder cannot be associated with eosinophil-based tissue damage or a primary or secondary cause of eosinophilia. That is, it is a diagnosis of exclusion and has no known cause. Over time, this disorder can resolve into a primary hypereosinophilia, typically clonal hypereosinophilia, chronic eosinophilic leukemia, or an eosinophilia associated with another hematological leukemia. The disorder may also become associated with tissue or organ damage and therefore be diagnosed as the hypereosinophilic syndrome. Idiopathic hypereosinophilia is treated by observation to detect development of the cited more serious disorders.

==== Idiopathic hypereosiophilic syndrome ====
The idiopathic hypereosinophilic syndrome is a disorder characterized by hypereosinophilia that is associated with eosinophil-based tissue or organ damage. While almost any organ or tissue may be damaged, the lung, skin, heart, blood vessels, sinuses, kidneys, and brain are the most commonly affected. The World Health Organization restrict this diagnosis to cases which have no well-defined cause. That is, all cases of secondary (i.e. reactive) eosinophilia (including lymphocyte-variant hypereosinophilia) and primary hypereosinophilia (including chronic eosinophilic leukemia (NOS), clonal eosinophilia, and hypereosinophilia associated with hematological malignancies) are excluded from this diagnosis.

=== Secondary hypereosinophilia ===
Secondary (or reactive) eosinophilias are non-clonal increases in blood eosinophil levels caused by an underlying disease. The pathogenesis of the hypereosinophilia in these diseases is thought to be the release of one or more cytokines (e.g. granulocyte macrophage colony stimulating factor, interleukin 3, interleukin 5) that: a) cause bone marrow precursor cells, i.e. CFU-Eos, to proliferate and mature into eosinophils; b) promote release of bone marrow eosinophils into the circulation, c) stimulate circulating eosinophils to enter tissues and release tissue-injuring agents. These cytokines may be released by the diseased cells or the diseased cells may cause the release of these cytokines by non-diseased cells. Primary disorders associated with and known or presumed to cause hypereosinophilia or eosinophilia are given below.

==== Infections ====
Helminths are common causes of hypereosinophilia and eosinophilia in areas endemic to these parasites. Helminths infections causing increased blood eosinophil counts include: 1) nematodes, (e.g. Angiostrongylus cantonensis and Hookworm infections), ascariasis, strongyloidiasis trichinosis, visceral larva migrans, Gnathostomiasis, cysticercosis, and echinococcosis; 2) filarioidea, e.g. tropical pulmonary eosinophilia, loiasis, and onchocerciasis; and 3) flukes, e.g. schistosomiasis, fascioliasis, clonorchiasis, paragonimiasis, and fasciolopsiasis. Other infections associated with increased eosinophil blood counts include: protozoan infections, e.g. Isospora belli and Dientamoeba fragilis) and sarcocystis); fungal infections (e.g. disseminated histoplasmosis, cryptococcosis [especially in cases with central nervous system involvement]), and coccidioides); and viral infections, e.g. Human T-lymphotropic virus 1 and HIV.

==== Autoimmune diseases ====
Hypereosinophilia or eosinophilia may be associated with the following autoimmune diseases: systemic lupus erythematosus eosinophilic fasciitis, eosinophilic granulomatosis with polyangiitis, dermatomyositis, severe rheumatoid arthritis, progressive systemic sclerosis, Sjögren syndrome, thromboangiitis obliterans, Behçet's disease, IgG4-related disease, inflammatory bowel diseases, sarcoidosis, bullous pemphigoid, and dermatitis herpetiformis.

==== Allergic diseases ====
Eosinophilia and comparatively fewer cases of hypereosinophilia are associated with the following known diseases that are known or thought to have an allergic basis: allergic rhinitis, asthma, atopic dermatitis, eosinophilic esophagitis, chronic sinusitis, aspirin-exacerbated respiratory disease, allergic bronchopulmonary aspergillosis, chronic eosinophilic pneumonia, and Kimura's disease.

Certain types of food allergy disorders may also be associated with eosinophilia or, less commonly, hypereosinophilia. Allergic eosinophilic esophagitis and the food protein-induced enterocolitis syndrome are commonly associated with increased blood eosinophil levels.

==== Drugs ====
A wide range of drugs are known to cause hypereosinophilia or eosinophilia accompanied by an array of allergic symptoms. Rarely, these reactions are severe causing, for example, the drug reaction with eosinophilia and systemic symptoms (DRESS) syndrome. Drug- induced hepatitis marked by immunoallergic pathology, which has much bidirectional crossover with DRESS syndrome, is typically accompanied by some severity of eosinophilia. While virtually any drug should be considered as a possible cause of these signs and symptoms, the following drugs and drug classes are some of the most frequently reported causes: penicillins, cephalosporins, dapsone, sulfonamides, carbamazepine, phenytoin, lamotrigine, valproic acid, nevirapine, efavirenz, and ibuprofen. These drugs may cause severely toxic reactions such as the DRESS syndrome. Other drugs and drug classes often reported to cause increased blood eosinophil levels accompanied by less severe (e.g. non-DRESS syndrome) symptoms include tetracyclins, doxycycline, linezolid, nitrofurantoin, metronidazole, carbamazepine, phenobarbital, lamotrigine, valproate, desipramine, amitriptyline, fluoxetine, piroxicam, diclofenac, ACE inhibitors, abacavir, nevirapine, ranitidine, cyclosporin, and hydrochlorothiazide.

The toxic oil syndrome is associated with hypereosinophilia/eosinophilia and systemic symptoms due to one or more contaminants in rapeseed oil and the eosinophilia–myalgia syndrome, also associated with hypereosinophilia, appears due to trace contaminants in certain commercial batches of the amino acid, L-tryptophan.

Allergic reactions to drugs are a common cause of eosinophilia, with manifestations ranging from diffuse maculopapular rash, to severe life-threatening drug reactions with eosinophilia and systemic symptoms (DRESS). Drugs that has, allopurinol, nonsteroidal anti-inflammatory drugs (NSAIDs), some antipsychotics such as risperidone, and certain antibiotics. Phenibut, an analogue of the neurotransmitter GABA, has also been implicated in high doses. The reaction which has been shown to be T-cell mediated may also cause eosinophilia-myalgia syndrome.

==== Malignancies ====
Certain malignancies cause a secondary eosinophilia or, less commonly, hypereosinophilia. These increases in blood eosinophils appear due to the release of stimulatory cytokines or invasion of the bone marrow and thereby irritation of resident eosinophils or their precursors. Malignancies associated with these effects include gastric, colorectal, lung, bladder, and thyroid cancers, as well as squamous cell cancers of the cervix, vagina, penis, skin, and nasopharynx. Some hematological malignancies are likewise associated with secondary rises in blood eosinophil counts; these include Hodgkin disease, certain T-cell lymphomas, acute myeloid leukemia, the myelodysplastic syndromes, many cases of systemic mastocytosis, chronic myeloid leukemia, polycythemia vera, essential thrombocythemia, myelofibrosis, chronic myelomonocytic leukemia, and certain cases of T-lymphoblastic leukemia/lymphoma-associated or myelodysplastic–myeloproliferative syndrome-associated eosinophilias.

Hodgkin lymphoma (Hodgkin's disease) often elicits severe eosinophilia; however, non-Hodgkin lymphoma and leukemia produce less marked eosinophilia. Of solid tumor neoplasms, ovarian cancer is most likely to provoke eosinophilia, though any other cancer can cause the condition. Solid epithelial cell tumors have been shown to cause both tissue and blood eosinophilia, with some reports indicating that this may be mediated by interleukin production by tumor cells, especially IL-5 or IL-3. This has also been shown to occur in Hodgkin lymphoma, in the form of IL-5 secreted by Reed-Sternberg cells. In primary cutaneous T cell lymphoma, blood and dermal eosinophilia are often seen. Lymphoma cells have also been shown to produce IL-5 in these disorders. Other types of lymphoid malignancies have been associated with eosinophilia, as in lymphoblastic leukemia with a translocation between chromosomes 5 and 14 or alterations in the genes which encode platelet-derived growth factor receptors alpha or beta. Patients displaying eosinophilia overexpress a gene encoding an eosinophil hematopoietin. A translocation between chromosomes 5 and 14 in patients with acute B lymphocytic leukemia resulted in the juxtaposition of the IL-3 gene and the immunoglobulin heavy-chain gene, causing overproduction production of IL-3, leading to blood and tissue eosinophilia.

==== Primary immunodeficiency diseases ====
Primary immunodeficiency diseases are inborn errors in the immune system due to defective genes. Certain of these disorders are sometimes or often associated with hypereosinophilia. The list of such disorders includes ZAP70 deficiency (defective ZAP70 gene), CD3gamma chain deficiency (defective CD3G gene), MCHII deficiency (defective RFXANK gene), Wiskott–Aldrich syndrome (defective WAS gene), IPEX syndrome (defective IPEX gene), CD40 gene defect, and autoimmune lymphoproliferative syndrome (defective Fas receptor gene). More than 30 other primary immunodeficiency diseases are sometimes associated with modest increases in eosinophil counts, i.e. eosinophilia. The hyperimmunoglobulin E syndrome is associated with hypereosinophilia or eosinophilia due to mutations in any one of the following genes: STAT3, DOCK8, PGM3, SPINK5, and TYK2 (see mutations in the hymperimmoglobulin E syndrome). Omenn syndrome is a severe combined immunodeficiency disease characterized by skin rash, splenomegaly, and lymphadenopathy due to a causative mutation in RAG1, RAG2, or, more rarely, one of several other genes.

==== Lymphocyte-variant hypereosinophilia ====
Lymphocyte-variant hypereosinophilia is a disorder attributed to the expansion of a cytokine-producing, aberrant population of a particular T-cell phenotype. The disorder is clonal with regard to the production of abnormal T-cell lymphocytes not eosinophils which appear phenotypically normal. The phenotypically aberrant lymphocytes function abnormally by stimulating the proliferation and maturation of bone marrow eosinophil-precursor cells which in studied cases appears due to their excess production of interleukin 5, interleukin 3, or interleukin 13. The disorder is usually indolent but infrequently progresses to T-cell lymphoma or Sezary syndrome. Accumulation of partial deletions in the short arm of chromosome 6, the long arm of chromosome 10, or the acquirement of an extra chromosome (i.e. trisomy) 7) in T-cells or the proliferation of lymphocytes with the CD3 negative, CD41 positive immunophenotype may occur during the disorders progression to lymphoma. Reports on treatment of the disorder are rare. In on study of 16 lymphocyte-variant hypereosinophilia patients with the aberrant CD3 negative, CD41 positive immunophenotype, good responds to corticosteroid drugs were uniform but 16 ultimately required corticosteroid-sparing agents. Hydroxyurea and imatinib are less likely to have efficacy in this variant of hypereosinophilia than in many cases of clonal eosinophilia or chronic eosinophilic leukemia.

==== Gleich's syndrome ====
Gleich's syndrome, which may be a form of lymphocyte-variant hypereosinophilia, involves hypereosinophilia, elevated blood levels of IgM antibodies, and clonal expansion of T cells. Similar to lymphocyte-variant hypereosinophilia, the increased levels of blood eosinophils in Gleich's syndrome is thought to be secondary to the secretion of eosinophil-stimulating cytokines by a T cell clones.

==== IgG4-related disease ====
IgG4-related disease or Immunoglobulin G4-related disease is a condition dacryoadenitis, sialadenitis, lymphadenitis, and pancreatitis (i.e. inflammation of the lacrimal glands, salivary glands, lymph nodes, and pancreas, respectively) plus retroperitoneal fibrosis. Less commonly, almost any other organ or tissue except joints and brain may be beleaguered by the inflammatory disorder. About 1/3 of cases exhibit eosinophilia or, rarely, hypereosinophilia. This increase in blood eosinophil count is often associated with abnormal T-lymphocyte clones (e.g. increased numbers of CD4 negative, CD7 positive T cells, CD3 negative, CD4 positive T cells, or CD3 positive, CD4 negative, CD8 negative T cells) and is thought to be secondary to these immunological disturbances. The disorder often exhibits are recurrent-relapsing course and is highly responsive to corticosteroids or rituximab as first-line therapy and interferon gamma as second-line therapy.

==== Angiolymphoid hyperplasia with eosinophilia ====
Angiolymphoid hyperplasia with eosinophilia is a disorder initially classified as a form of IgG4-related diseases but now considered a distinct entity. The disorder involves inflamed benign tumors of the vasculature in skin and, less commonly, other tissues. The tumors consist of histiocytoid endothelial cells prominently infiltrated by lymphocytes and eosinophils and is associated with hypereosinophilia or eosinophilia.

==== Cholesterol embolism ====
Transient, fluctuating hypereosinophilia occurs in 60–80% of individuals with cholesterol embolisms. In this disorder, cholesterol crystals located in an atherosclerotic plaque of a large artery dislodge, travel downstream in the blood, and clog smaller arteries. This results in obstructive damage to multiple organs and tissues. Affected tissues exhibit acute inflammation involving eosinophils, neutrophils, monocytes, lymphocytes, and plasma cells. The cause for this hypereosinophilic response is not known.

==== Adrenal insufficiency ====
A class of steroid hormones secreted by the adrenal gland, glucocorticoids, inhibit eosinophil proliferation and survival. In adrenal insufficiency, low levels of these hormones allow increased eosinophil proliferation and survival. This leads to increases in blood eosinophil levels, typically eosinophilia and, less commonly, hypereosinophilia.

=== Organ-restricted hypereosinophilias ===
Hypereosinophilia may occur in the setting of damage to a single specific organ due to a massive infiltration by eosinophils. This disorder is sub-classified based on the organ involved and is not considered to be a form of primary hypereosinophilia, secondary hypereosinophilia, or the idiopathic hypereosinophilic syndrome because: a) the eosinophils associated with the disorder have not been shown to be clonal in nature; b) a reason for the increase in blood eosinophils has not been determined; c) organ damage has not been shown to be due to eosinophils; and d) the disorder in each individual case typically is limited to the affected organ. Examples of organ-restricted hypereosinophilia include eosinophilic myocarditis, eosinophilic esophagitis, eosinophilic gastroenteritis, eosinophilic cystitis, eosinophilic pneumonia, eosinophilic fasciitis, eosinophilic folliculitis, eosinophilic cellulitis, eosinophilic vasculitis, and eosinophilic ulcer of the oral mucosa. Other examples of organ-restricted hypereosinophilia include those involving the heart, kidney, liver, colon, pulmonary pleurae, peritoneum, fat tissue, myometrium, and synovia.

== Pathophysiology ==
IgE-mediated eosinophil production is induced by compounds released by basophils and mast cells, including eosinophil chemotactic factor of anaphylaxis, leukotriene B4 and serotonin mediated release of eosinophil granules occur, complement complex (C5-C6-C7), interleukin 5, and histamine (though this has a narrow range of concentration).

Harm resulting from untreated eosinophilia potentially varies with cause. During an allergic reaction, the release of histamine from mast cells causes vasodilation which allows eosinophils to migrate from the blood and localize in affected tissues. Accumulation of eosinophils in tissues can be significantly damaging. Eosinophils, like other granulocytes, contain granules (or sacs) filled with digestive enzymes and cytotoxic proteins which under normal conditions are used to destroy parasites but in eosinophilia these agents can damage healthy tissues. In addition to these agents, the granules in eosinophils also contain inflammatory molecules and cytokines which can recruit more eosinophils and other inflammatory cells to the area and hence amplify and perpetuate the damage. This process is generally accepted to be the major inflammatory process in the pathophysiology of atopic or allergic asthma.

== Diagnosis ==
Diagnosis is by complete blood count (CBC). However, in some cases, a more accurate absolute eosinophil count may be needed. Medical history is taken, with emphasis on travel, allergies and drug use. Specific test for causative conditions are performed, often including chest x-ray, urinalysis, liver and kidney function tests, and serologic tests for parasitic and connective tissue diseases. The stool is often examined for traces of parasites (i.e. eggs, larvae, etc.) though a negative test does not rule out parasitic infection; for example, trichinosis requires a muscle biopsy. Elevated serum B_{12} or low white blood cell alkaline phosphatase, or leukocytic abnormalities in a peripheral smear indicates a disorder of myeloproliferation. In cases of idiopathic eosinophilia, the patient is followed for complications. A brief trial of corticosteroids can be diagnostic for allergic causes, as the eosinophilia should resolve with suppression of the immune over-response. Neoplastic disorders are diagnosed through the usual methods, such as bone marrow aspiration and biopsy for the leukemias, MRI/CT to look for solid tumors, and tests for serum LDH and other tumor markers.

== Treatment ==
Treatment is directed toward the underlying cause. However, in primary eosinophilia, or if the eosinophil count must be lowered, corticosteroids such as prednisone may be used. However, immune suppression, the mechanism of action of corticosteroids, can be fatal in patients with parasitosis.

== List of causes ==
Eosinophilia can be idiopathic (primary) or, more commonly, secondary to another disease. In the Western World, allergic or atopic diseases are the most common causes, especially those of the respiratory or integumentary systems. In the developing world, parasites are the most common cause. A parasitic infection of nearly any bodily tissue can cause eosinophilia. Diseases that feature eosinophilia as a sign include:

- Allergic disorders
  - Asthma
  - Hay fever
  - Drug allergies
  - Allergic skin diseases
    - Pemphigus
    - Dermatitis herpetiformis
- IgG4-related disease
- Parasitic infections
- Addison's disease and stress-induced suppression of adrenal gland function
- Some forms of malignancy
  - Acute lymphoblastic leukemia
  - Chronic myelogenous leukemia
  - Eosinophilic leukemia
  - Clonal eosinophilia
  - Hodgkin lymphoma
  - Some forms of non-Hodgkin lymphoma
  - Lymphocyte-variant hypereosinophilia
  - Systemic mastocytosis
- Systemic autoimmune diseases
  - Systemic lupus erythematosus
  - Kimura disease
  - Eosinophilic granulomatosis with polyangiitis
  - Eosinophilic fasciitis
  - Eosinophilic myositis
- Eosinophilic myocarditis
- Eosinophilic esophagitis
- Eosinophilic gastroenteritis
- Cholesterol embolism (transiently)
- Coccidioidomycosis (Valley fever), a fungal disease prominent in the US Southwest.
- Human immunodeficiency virus infection
- Interstitial nephropathy
- Idiopathic hypereosinophilic syndrome.
- Congenital disorders
  - Hyperimmunoglobulin E syndrome, an immune disorder characterized by high levels of serum IgE
  - Omenn syndrome
  - Familial eosinophilia

== See also ==
- Acidophile (histology)
