= Lymphocyte-variant hypereosinophilia =

- Other names: Lymphocyte variant eosinophilia

Lymphocyte-variant hypereosinophilia is a rare disorder in which eosinophilia or hypereosinophilia (i.e. a large or extremely large increase in the number of eosinophils in the blood circulation) is caused by an aberrant population of lymphocytes. These aberrant lymphocytes function abnormally by stimulating the proliferation and maturation of bone marrow eosinophil-precursor cells termed colony forming unit-eosinophils or CFU-Eos.

The overly stimulated CFU-Eos cells mature to apparently normal appearing but possibly overactive eosinophils which enter the circulation and may accumulate in and damage various tissues. The disorder is usually indolent or slowly progressive but may proceed to a leukemic phase sometimes classified as acute eosinophilic leukemia. Lymphocyte-variant hypereosinophilia can therefore be regarded as a precancerous disorder.

The disorder merits therapeutic intervention to avoid or reduce eosinophil-induced tissue injury and treat its leukemic phase. The latter phase is aggressive and typically responds relatively poorly to anti-leukemia chemotherapeutic drug regimens.

== Presentation ==
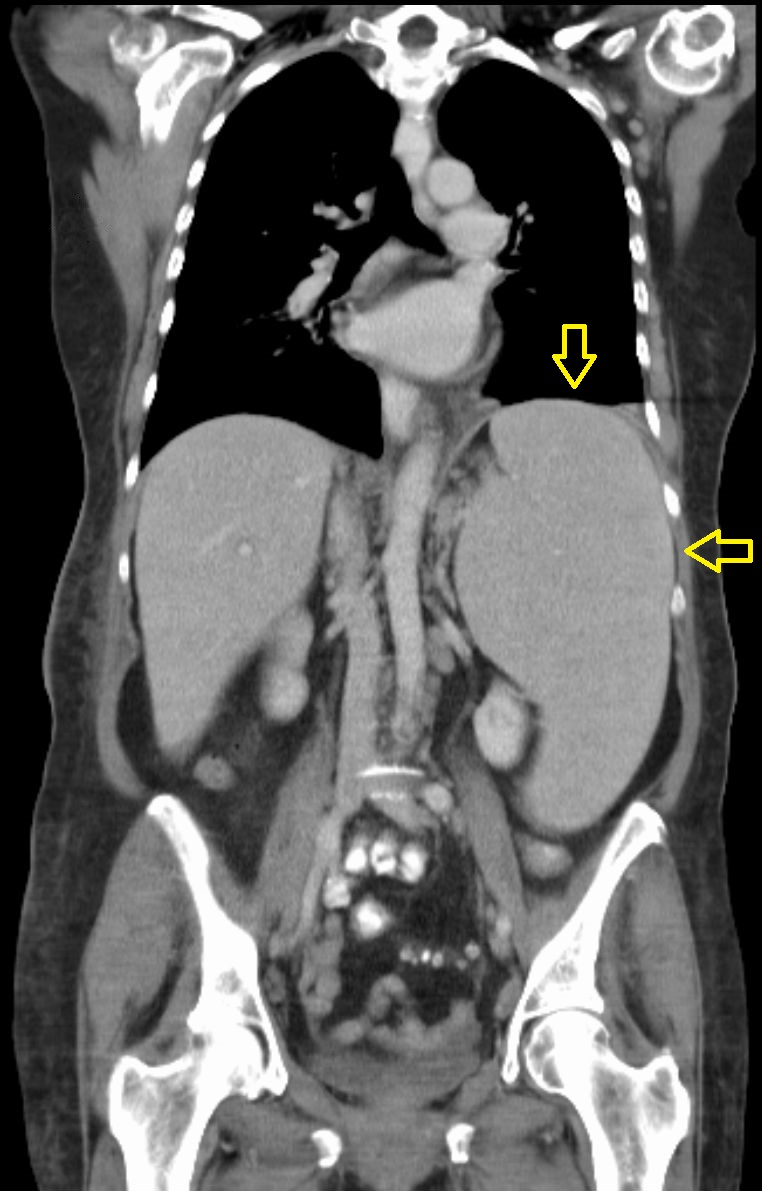
Splenomegaly

The typical patient with lymphocyte-variant hypereosinophilia presents with an extended history of hypereosinophilia and cutaneous allergy-like symptoms. Skin symptoms, which occur in >75% of patients, include erythroderma, pruritus, eczema, poikiloderma, urticarial, and episodic angioedema. The symptom of episodic angioedema (i.e. soft tissue swelling of the face, tongue, larynx, abdomen, arms, or legs) in lymphocyte-variant hypereosinophilia resembles that occurring in Gleich's syndrome, a rare disease that is accompanied by secondary hypereosinophilia plus a sub-population of CD3(-), CD4(+) T cells; this involvement of the latter cell types supports the notion that Gleich's syndrome is a subtype of lymphocyte-variant hypereosiophilia. Biopsies of skin lesions commonly find prominent accumulations of eosinophils. Other presentations include:

- a) lymphadenopathy occurring in ~60% of patients;
- b) eosinophil infiltrations in lung similar to, and often diagnosed as, eosinophilic pneumonia, occurring in ~20% of patients;
- c) episodic angioedema-related gastrointestinal symptoms that are sometimes similar to symptoms of the irritable bowel syndrome occurring in ~20% of patients;
- d) rheumatologic manifestations of inflammatory arthralgias in ~20% of patients; and
- e) splenomegaly occurring in ~10% of patients.

Cardiovascular complications such as various types of heart damage due to eosinophilic myocarditis and vascular disorders due to eosinophil infiltration of the vascular wall that lead to vascular thrombosis are often critical components of persistent hypereosinophilia syndromes; These complications are not a prominent component of lymphocyte-variant hypereosionophilia, occurring in <10% of patients.

=== Other lymphoid disorders associated with eosinophilia ===
Lymphoid neoplasms can be associated with eosinophilia presumably because of the secretion of eosinophil/eosinophil precursor cell-stimulating cytokines by the malignant lymphoid cells. Most commonly, this is seen in cutaneous T cell lymphoma, adult T-cell leukemia/lymphoma, and angioimmunoblastic T cell lymphoma. Less often, it is seen in B cell neoplasms such as Hodgkin's lymphoma, and B cell acute lymphoblastic leukemia, particularly forms of the latter disease associated with the t(5;9)(q31;p24) translocation creating gene fusion between the IL3 (at chromosome 5q31) and the JAK2 (at chromosome 9p24). The JAK2-IL3 fusion gene associated disease is accompanied by the overproduction of IL3, a simulator of eosinophil and eosinophil precursor cell growth.

== Pathogenesis ==
Following the historical findings cited above, studies identified the cytokine, interleukin 5 (IL5), as the eosinophil growth-stimulating CFU made by T cells from patients suffering the idiopathic hypereosinophilic syndrome. Subsequent studies likewise identified IL5 as a cytokine being overproduced by certain lymphocytes taken from patients with lymphocyte-variant eosinophilia. These and other studies support the view that lymphocyte-variant hypereosinophilia is a unique disease characterized by hypereosinophilia secondary to the pathological production of eosinophil growth factors, particularly IL5 but possibly also IL4; IL13, and GM-CSF by one or more aberrant clones of T cells. The aberrant T cell clone, as defined by immunophenotyping their expression of certain cell surface molecules, the cluster of differentiation (i.e. CD) proteins, varies from patient to patient; furthermore, some of these clones also exhibit clonal rearrangements in their T-cell receptor gene. The most common immunophenotypes in lymphocyte-variant eosinophilia are: a) CD3(−), CD4(+) T cells, b) CD3(+), CD4+, CD8(−) T cells, c) CD3(+), CD4(+), CD7(−) T cells also bearing αβ+ T cell receptors, d) CD3(+), CD4(+), CD7(-) T cells, and e) CD3(+), CD4(+), CD2(-) T cells. Chromosome abnormalities such as breakage of the long ("q") arm of chromosome 16, partial deletions in the q arm of chromosome 6 or short ("p") arm of chromosome 10, and trisomy of chromosome 7 are occasionally detected in these T cells. Regardless of immunophenotype, these T cells typically express CD45RO plus HLA-DR and/or IL2RA (also termed CD25} cell surface antigens. Expression of these antigens is characteristic of activated memory T cells.

The underlying cause(s) for the origination and expansion of the phenotypically and clonally aberrant T cells in lymphocyte-variant hypereosinophilia remains unclear. In all events, these aberrant T cells are not, at least initially, malignant although they do exhibit pathological behavior. They produce, in addition to interleukin 5, another eosinophil-stimulating cytokine, granulocyte macrophage colony-stimulating factor. The aberrant T cells also produce: IL4, a T cell-stimulating cytokine; interleukin 13, a cytokine mediator of allergic reactions, particularly those occurring in the lung; IL2, a t cell-stimulating cytokine, tumor necrosis factor alpha, a proinflammatory cytokine that regulates immune responses, and, at least in the aberrant T cells of certain patients, interferon gamma (i.e. IFGγ), s cytokine that regulates innate and adaptive immunity. These cells also stimulate other, non-clonal lymphocytes to secrete chemokine (C-C motif) ligand 17 (also termed CC17 or TARC), a T cell-stimulating cytokine belonging to the CC chemokine family. While IL-5 is regarded as the principal mediator of the eosinophilia found in lymphocyte-variant hypereosinophilia, one or more of the other cited cytokines may also contribute to this eosinophilia as well as other pathological features of the disease.

== Diagnosis ==
Criteria for the clinically defined diagnosis of lymphocyte-variant hypereosinophilia have not been strictly set forth. Diagnosis must first rule out other causes of eosinophilia and hypereosinophilia, such as those due to allergies, drug reactions, infestations, and autoimmune diseases as well as those associated with eosinophilic leukemia, clonal eosinophilia, systemic mastocytosis, and other malignancies (see causes of eosinophilia). Criteria for the diagnosis include findings of: a) long term hypereosinophilia (i.e. eosinophil blood counts >1,500/microliter) plus physical findings and symptoms associated with the disease; b) bone marrow analysis showing abnormally high levels of eosinophils; c) elevated serum levels of Immunoglobulin E, other immunoglobulins, and CCL17; d) eosinophil infiltrates in afflicted tissues; e) increased numbers of blood and/or bone marrow T cells bearing abnormal immunophenotype cluster of differentiation markers as defined by fluorescence-activated cell sorting (see above section on Pathogenesis); f) abnormal T cell receptor arrangements as defined by polymerase chain reaction methods (see above section on Pathogenesis); and g) evidence of excessive IL-5 secretion by lymphocytes (see above section on Pathogenesis). In many clinical settings, however, studies on the T cell receptor and IL-5 are not available and therefore not routine parts of the diagnostic work-up or criteria for the disease. The finding of T cells bearing abnormal immunophenotype cluster of differentiation markers is critical to making the diagnosis.

== Treatment ==
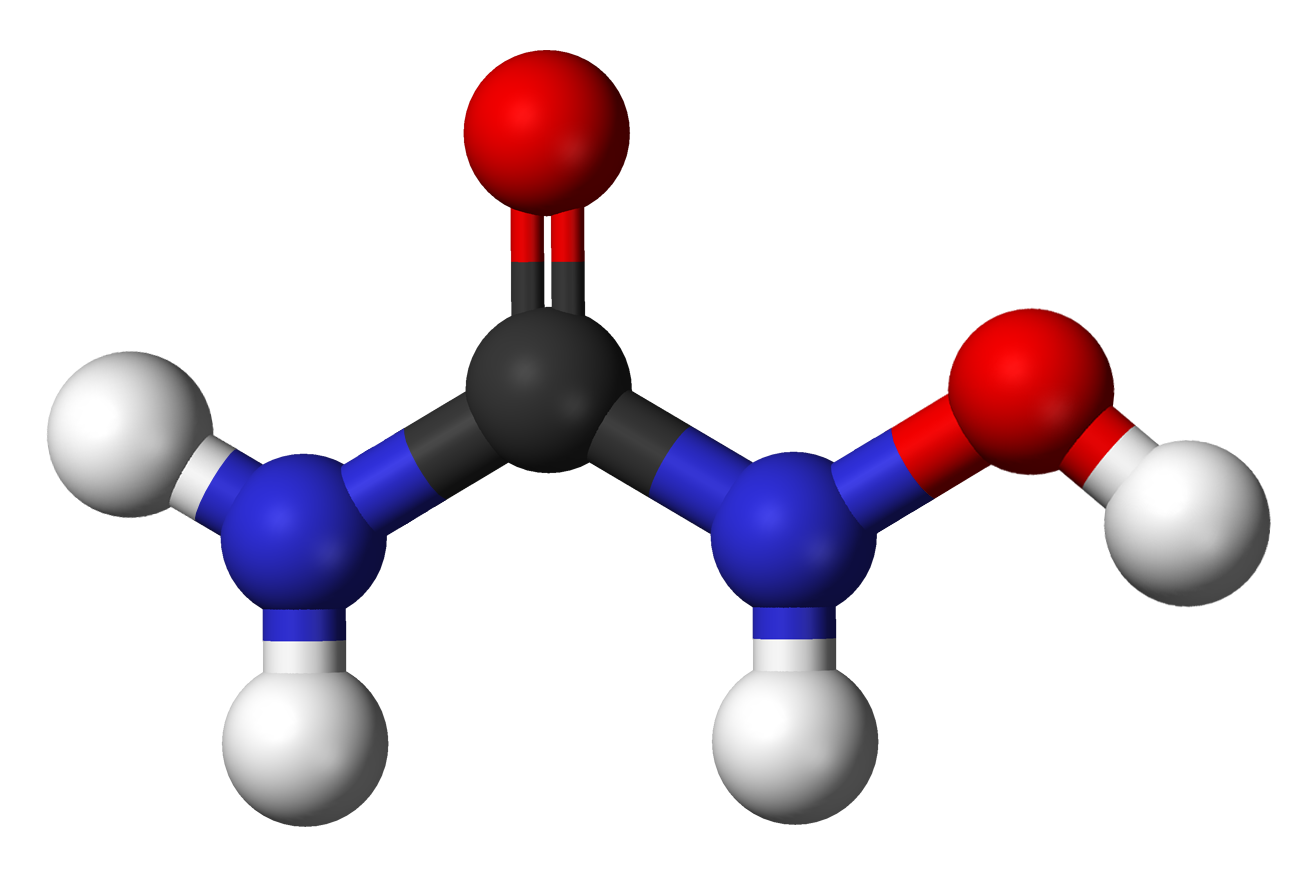
Hydroxyurea (Hydroxycarbamide)

Lymphocyte-variant hypereosinophilia usually takes a benign and indolent course. Long-term treatment with corticosteroids lowers blood eosinophil levels as well as suppresses and prevents complications of the disease in >80% of cases. However, signs and symptoms of the disease recur in virtually all cases if corticosteroid dosages are tapered in order to reduce the many adverse side effects of corticosteroids. Alternate treatments used to treat corticosteroid resistant disease or for use as corticosteroid-sparing substitutes include interferon-α or its analog, peginterferon alfa-2a, mepolizumab (an antibody directed against IL-5), ciclosporin (an immunosuppressive drug), imatinib (an inhibitor of tyrosine kinases; numerous tyrosine kinase cell signaling proteins are responsible for the growth and proliferation of eosinophils (see clonal eosinophilia}), methotrexate and hydroxycarbamide (both are chemotherapy and immunosuppressant drugs), and alemtuzumab (an antibody that binds to the CD52 antigen on mature lymphocytes thereby marking them for destruction by the body). The few patients who have been treated with these alternate drugs have exhibited good responses in the majority of instances. Reslizumab, a newly developed antibody directed against interleukin 5 that has been successfully used to treat 4 patients with the hypereosinophilic syndrome, may also be of use for lymphocyte-variant eosinophilia. Patients suffering minimal or no disease complications have gone untreated.

In 10% to 25% of patients, mostly 3 to 10 years after initial diagnosis, the indolent course of lymphocyte-variant hypereosinophilia changes. Patients exhibit rapid increases in lymphadenopathy, spleen size, and blood cell numbers, some cells of which take on the appearance of immature and/or malignant cells. Their disease soon thereafter escalates to an angioimmunoblastic T-cell lymphoma, peripheral T cell lymphoma, anaplastic large-cell lymphoma (which unlike most lymphomas of this type is anaplastic lymphoma kinase-negative), or cutaneous T cell lymphoma. The malignantly transformed disease is aggressive and has a poor prognosis. Recommended treatment includes chemotherapy with fludarabine, cladribine, or the CHOP combination of drugs followed by bone marrow transplantation.

== History ==
For years, lymphocyte-variant hypereosinophilia was used to describe hypereosinophilia associated with any one of several aberrant T cell lymphoproliferative disorders. In 1987, however, a 42-year-old male patient was described who presented with cardiac failure, mitral heart valve regurgitation, pericardial effusion, splenomegaly, kidney dysfunction, non-specific skin lesions, a six-year history of eosinophilia, and, on admission, an eosinophil blood count of 7,150 per microliter (normal <500/microliter), a level that was 50% of total white blood cells (normal <5%). Blood smears revealed that these eosinophils as well as other white blood cells were mature and normal in appearance. Bone marrow examination revealed greatly increased eosinophils (60% of nucleated cells) in all states of maturation but with a normal karyotype; tissue biopsies revealed eosinophil infiltrates in liver and skin as well as eosinophilic vasculitis. Cell cultures from the patient's bone morrow grew an abnormally high percentage (52%) of eosinophil colony-forming units (CFUs). Nine of 25 cell clones derived from the patient's blood T cells stimulated abnormally high (>60%) eosinophil CFUs when incubated with bone marrow cells taken from a non-identical donor; supernatant fluid taken from the patient's T cells was also active in inducing eosinophil CFUs from the non-identical donor's bone marrow cells. Immunophenotyping of these eosinophil CFU-stimulating T cells indicated that they expressed the CD4 but not CD8 cell surface cluster of differentiation antigen, suggesting that they were cytokine-secreting helper T cells. Characterization of the T cell receptor on these T cell's revealed several patterns of rearrangement in the receptor's β chains. The eosinophilia in this patient, therefore, appeared due to the expansion of a clone of T cells that secreted a factor stimulating bone marrow precursor cells to differentiate into normal eosinophils.
