= Kosaki overgrowth syndrome =

Kosaki Overgrowth Syndrome
- Kosaki overgrowth syndrome is inherited in an autosomal dominant manner.

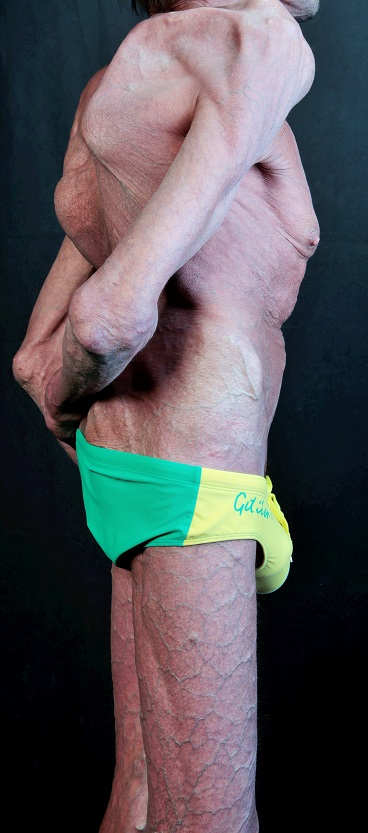
Kosaki overgrowth syndrome

Kosaki overgrowth syndrome is a rare syndrome caused by mutations in the PDGFRB gene.

== Presentation ==
The features of this syndrome affect the face, skin, brain and the body.

Face:

- downslanting palpebral fissures
- pointed chin
- prominent forehead
- proptosis
- thin upper lip
- wide nasal bridge

Skin:

- fragile
- hyperelastic

Brain:

- Low IQ
- Periventricular white matter lesions

Body:

The height, lower-segment, hand, and foot length are all greater than usual.

== Genetics ==
No inheritance pattern has been described as these mutations appear to have arisen de novo. This syndrome is due to mutations in a single copy of the PDGFRB gene.

== History ==
This condition was first described in Japan in 2011 by Watanabe et al. These authors thought the condition was the Shprintzen-Goldberg syndrome but the patient lacked a mutation in the SKI gene. A second case was described by Takenouchi et al in 2015. These authors recognised that this condition was novel and on performing a whole genome sequencing found mutations in the PDGFRB gene. A further 24 cases were reported in 2017 by Gawliński et al.
