= Eosinophilic myocarditis =

- Specialty: Cardiology

Eosinophilic myocarditis is inflammation in the heart muscle that is caused by the infiltration and destructive activity of a type of white blood cell, the eosinophil. Typically, the disorder is associated with hypereosinophilia, i.e. an eosinophil blood cell count greater than 1,500 per microliter (normal 100 to 400 per microliter). It is distinguished from non-eosinophilic myocarditis, which is heart inflammation caused by other types of white blood cells, i.e. lymphocytes and monocytes, as well as the respective descendants of these cells, NK cells and macrophages. This distinction is important because the eosinophil-based disorder is due to a particular set of underlying diseases and its preferred treatments differ from those for non-eosinophilic myocarditis.

Eosinophilic myocarditis is often viewed as a disorder that has three progressive stages. The first stage of eosinophilic myocarditis involves acute inflammation and cardiac cell necrosis (i.e. areas of dead cells); it is dominated by symptoms characterized as the acute coronary syndrome such as angina, heart attack and/or congestive heart failure. The second stage is a thrombotic stage wherein the endocardium (i.e. interior wall) of the diseased heart forms blood clots which break off, travel in, and block blood through systemic or pulmonary arteries; this stage may dominate the initial presentation in some individuals. The third stage is a fibrotic stage wherein scarring replaces damaged heart muscle tissue to cause a clinical presentation dominated by a poorly contracting heart and cardiac valve disease. Perhaps less commonly, eosinophilic myocarditis, eosinophilic thrombotic myocarditis, and eosinophilic fibrotic myocarditis are viewed as three separate but sequentially linked disorders in a spectrum of disorders termed eosinophilic cardiac diseases. The focus here is on eosinophilic myocarditis as a distinct disorder separate from its thrombotic and fibrotic sequelae.

Eosinophilic myocarditis is a rare disorder. It is usually associated with, and considered secondary to, an underlying cause for the pathological behavior of the eosinophils such a toxic reaction to a drug (one of its more common causes in developed nations), the consequence of certain types of parasite and protozoan infections (a more common cause of the disorder in areas with these infestations), or the result of excessively high levels of activated blood eosinophils due to a wide range of other causes. The specific treatment (i.e. treatment other than measures to support the cardiovascular system) of eosinophilic myocarditis differs from the specific treatment of other forms of myocarditis in that it is focused on relieving the underlying reason for the excessively high numbers and hyperactivity of eosinophils as well as on inhibiting the pathological actions of these cells.

== Signs and symptoms ==
Symptoms in eosinophilic myocarditis are highly variable. They tend to reflect the many underlying disorders causing eosinophil dysfunction as well as the widely differing progression rates of cardiac damage. Before cardiac symptoms are detected, some 66% of cases have symptoms of a common cold and 33% have symptoms of asthma, rhinitis, urticarial, or other allergic disorder. Cardiac manifestations of eosinophilic myocarditis range from none to life-threatening conditions such as cardiogenic shock or sudden death due to abnormal heart rhythms. More commonly the presenting cardiac symptoms of the disorder are the same as those seen in other forms of heart disease: chest pain, shortness of breath, fatigue, chest palpitations, light headedness, and syncope. In its most extreme form, however, eosinophilic myocarditis can present as acute necrotizing eosinophilic myocarditis, i.e. with symptoms of chaotic and potentially lethal heart failure and heart arrhythmias. This rarest form of the disorder reflects a rapidly progressive and extensive eosinophilic infiltration of the heart that is accompanied by massive myocardial cell necrosis.

Hypereosinophilia (i.e. blood eosinophil counts at or above 1,500 per microliter) or, less commonly, eosinophilia (counts above 500 but below 1,500 per microliter) are found in the vast majority of cases of eosinophilic myocarditis and are valuable clues that point to this rather than other types of myocarditis or myocardial injuries. However, elevated blood eosinophil counts may not occur during the early phase of the disorder. Other, less specific laboratory findings implicate a cardiac disorder but not necessarily eosinophilic myocarditis. These include elevations in blood markers for systemic inflammation (e.g. C reactive protein, erythrocyte sedimentation rate), elevations in blood markers for cardiac injury (e.g. creatine kinase, troponins); and abnormal electrocardiograms ( mostly ST segment-T wave abnormalities).

== Cause ==
There are many causes of eosinophilia that may underlie eosinophilic myocarditis. These causes are classified as primary (i.e. a defect intrinsic to the eosinophil cell line), secondary (induced by an underlying disorder that stimulates the proliferation and activation of eosinophils), or idiopathic (i.e. unknown cause). Non-idiopathic causes of the disorder are sub-classified into various forms of allergic, autoimmune, infectious, or malignant diseases and hypersensitivity reactions to drugs, vaccines, or transplanted hearts. While virtually any cause for the elevation and activation of blood eosinophils must be considered as a potential cause for eosinophilic myocarditis, the following list gives the principal types of eosinophilia known or thought to underlie the disorder.

Primary conditions that may lead to eosinophilic myocarditis are:

- Clonal hypereosinophilia.
- Chronic eosinophilic leukemia.
- The idiopathic hypereosinophilic syndrome.

Secondary conditions that may lead to eosinophilic myocarditis are:

- Infections agents:
  - Parasitic worms: various Ascaris, Strongyloides, Schistosoma, filaria, Trematoda, and Nematode species. Parasitic infestations often cause significant heart valve disease along with myocarditis and the disorder in this setting is sometimes termed Tropical endomyocardial fibrosis. While commonly considered to be due to the cited parasites, this particular form of eosinophilic myocarditis may more often develop in individuals with other disorders, e.g. malnutrition, dietary toxins, and genetic predisposition, in addition to or in place of roundworm infestation.
  - Infections by protozoa: various Toxoplasma gondii, Trypanosoma cruzi, trichinella spiralis, Entamoeba, and Echinococcus species.
  - Viruses: While some viral infections (e.g. HIV) have been considered causes of eosinophilic endocarditis, a study of 20 patients concluded that viral myocarditis lacks the characteristic of eosinophil-induced damage in hearts taken during cardiac transplantation.
- Allergic and autoimmune diseases such as severe asthma, rhinitis, or urticarial, chronic sinusitis, aspirin-exacerbated respiratory disease, allergic bronchopulmonary aspergillosis, chronic eosinophilic pneumonia, Kimura's disease, polyarteritis nodosa, eosinophilic granulomatosis with polyangiitis, and rejection of transplanted hearts.
- Malignancies and/or premalignant hematologic conditions not due to a primary disorder in eosinophils such as Gleich's syndrome, Lymphocyte-variant hypereosinophilia Hodgkin disease, certain T-cell lymphomas, acute myeloid leukemia, the myelodysplastic syndromes, systemic mastocytosis, chronic myeloid leukemia, polycythemia vera, essential thrombocythemia, myelofibrosis, chronic myelomonocytic leukemia, and T-lymphoblastic leukemia/lymphoma-associated or myelodysplastic–myeloproliferative syndrome-associated eosinophilias; IgG4-related disease and Angiolymphoid hyperplasia with eosinophilia as well as non-hematologic cancers such as solid tumors of the lung, gastrointestinal tract, and genitourinary tract.
- Hypersensitivity reactions to agents include
  - Antibiotics/anti-viral agents: various penicillins (e.g. penicillin, ampicillin), cephalosporins (e.g. cephalosporin), tetracyclins (e.g. tetracycline), sulfonamides (e.g. sulfadiazine, sulfafurazole), sulfonylureas, antitubercular drugs (e.g. isoniazid, 4-aminosalicylic acid), linezolid, amphotericin B, chloramphenicol, streptomycin, dapsone, nitrofurantoin, metronidazole, nevirapine, efavirenz, abacavir, nevirapine.
  - Anticonvulsants/Antipsychotics/antidepressants: phenindione, phenytoin, phenobarbital, lamotrigine, lamotrigine, clozapine, valproic acid, carbamazepine, desipramine, fluoxetine, amitriptyline, olanzapine.
  - Anti-inflammatory agents: ibuprofen, indomethacin, phenylbutazone, oxyphenbutazone, acetazolamide, piroxicam, diclofenac.
  - Diuretics: hydrochlorothiazide, spironolactone, chlortalidone.
  - ACE inhibitors: captopril, enalapril.
  - Other drugs: digoxin, ranitidine, lenalidomide, methyldopa, interleukin 2, dobutamine, acetazolamide.
  - Contaminants: Unidentified contaminants in rapeseed oil cause the toxic oil syndrome and in commercial batches of the amino acid, L-tryptophan, cause the eosinophilia–myalgia syndrome.
  - Vaccinations: Tetanus toxoid, smallpox, and diphtheria/pertussis/tetanus vaccinations.

=== DRESS syndrome ===
The DRESS syndrome (Drug Reaction with Eosinophilia and Systemic Symptoms) is a severe immunological drug reaction. It differs from other drug reactions in that it: a) is caused by a particular set of drugs; b) typically occurs after a delay of 2 to 8 weeks following intake of an offending drug; c) presents with a specific set of signs and symptoms (i.e. modest or extreme elevations in blood eosinophil and atypical lymphocyte counts; acute onset of a skin rash; lymphadenopathy; fever; neuralgia; and involvement of at least one internal organ such as the liver, lung, or heart; d) develops in individuals with particular genetic predispositions; and e) involves reactivation of latent viruses, most commonly human herpesvirus 6 or more rarely human herpes virus 5 (i.e. human cytomegalovirus), human herpesvirus 7, and human herpesvirus 4 (i.e. Epstein–Barr virus). These viruses usually become dormant after infecting humans but under special circumstances, such as drug intake, are reactivated and may contribute to serious diseases such as the DRESS syndrome.

== Pathophysiology ==
Eosinophils normally function to neutralize invading microbes, primarily parasites but also certain types of fungi and viruses. In conducting these functions, eosinophils normally occupy the gastrointestinal tract, respiratory tract, and skin where they produce and release on demand a range of toxic reactive oxygen species (e.g. hypobromite, hypobromous acid, superoxide, and peroxide) and also release on demand a preformed armamentarium of chemical signals including cytokines, chemokines, growth factors, lipid mediators (e.g. leukotrienes, prostaglandins, platelet activating factor, 5-oxo-eicosatetraenoic acid), and toxic proteins (e.g. metalloproteinases, major basic protein, eosinophil cationic protein, eosinophil peroxidase, and eosinophil-derived neurotoxin). These agents serve to orchestrate robust inflammatory responses that destroy invading microorganisms. Eosinophils also participate in transplant rejection, Graft-versus-host disease, the destruction or walling off of foreign objects, and the killing of cancer cells. In conducting these functions, eosinophils enter tissues that they do not normally occupy.

When overproduced and over-activated, such as in cases of eosinophilic myocarditis, eosinophils behave as though they were attacking a foreign or malignant tissue: they enter a seemingly normal organ such as the heart, misdirect their reactive oxygen species and armamentarium of preformed molecules toward seemingly normal tissue such as heart muscle, and thereby produce serious damage such as heart failure. Animal model studies suggest reasons why eosinophils are directed to and injure the heart muscle. Mice made hypereosinophilic by the forced overexpression of an interleukin-5 transgene (interleukin 5 stimulates eosinophil proliferation, activation, and migration) develop eosinophilic myocarditis. A similar eosinophilic endocarditis occurs in mice immunized with the cardiac muscle protein, mouse myosin. In the latter model, endocarditis is reduced by inhibiting the cytokine interleukin-4 or eosinophils and is exacerbated by concurrently blocking two cytokines, interferon gamma and interleukin-17A. Finally, certain eosinophil-attracting agents, viz., eotaxins, are elevated in the cardiac tissue of myosin-immunized mice that are concurrently depleted of interferon-gamma and interleukin-17A. Eotaxins are also elevated in the cardiac muscle biopsy specimens of individuals with eosinophilic myocarditis compared to their levels in non-eosinophilic myocarditis. These findings suggest that eosinophilic myocarditis is caused by the abnormal proliferation and activation of eosinophils and that their directional migration into the heart is evoked by a set of cytokines and chemoattractants in mice and possibly humans.

== Diagnosis ==
In eosinophilic myocarditis, echocardiography typically gives non-specific and only occasional findings of endocardium thickening, left ventricular hypertrophy, left ventricle dilation, and involvement of the mitral and/or tricuspid valves. However, in acute necrotizing eosinophilic myocarditis, echocardiography usually gives diagnostically helpful evidence of a non-enlarged heart with a thickened and poorly contracting left ventricle. Gadolinium-based cardiac magnetic resonance imaging is the most useful non-invasive procedure for diagnosing eosinophilic myocarditis. It supports this diagnosis if it shows at least two of the following abnormalities: a) an increased signal in T2-weighted images; b) an increased global myocardial early enhancement ratio between myocardial and skeletal muscle in enhanced T1 images and c) one or more focal enhancements distributed in a non-vascular pattern in late enhanced T1-weighted images. Additionally, and unlike in other forms of myocarditis, eosinophilic myocarditis may also show enhanced gadolinium uptake in the sub-endocardium. However, the only definitive test for eosinophilic myocarditis is cardiac muscle biopsy showing the presence of eosinophilic infiltration. Since the disorder may be patchy, multiple tissue samples taken during the procedure improve the chances of uncovering the pathology but in any case, negative results do not exclude the diagnosis.

=== Eosinophilic coronary periarteritis ===
Eosinophilic coronary periarteritis is an extremely rare heart disorder caused by extensive eosinophilic infiltration of the adventitia and periadventitia, i.e. the soft tissues, surrounding the coronary arteries. The intima, tunica media, and tunica intima layers of these arteries remain intact and are generally unaffected. Thus, this disorder is characterized by episodes of angina, particularly Prinzmetal's angina, and chaotic heart arrhythmias which may lead to sudden death. The disorder is considered distinct from eosinophilic myocarditis as well as other forms of inflammatory arterial disorders in that it is limited to the coronary artery system.

== Treatment ==
Due to its rarity, no comprehensive treatment studies on eosinophilic myocarditis have been conducted. Small studies and case reports have directed efforts towards: a) supporting cardiac function by relieving heart failure and suppressing life-threatening abnormal heart rhythms; b) suppressing eosinophil-based cardiac inflammation; and c) treating the underlying disorder. In all cases of symptomatic eosinophilic myocarditis that lack specific treatment regimens for the underlying disorder, available studies recommend treating the inflammatory component of this disorder with non-specific immunosuppressive drugs, principally high-dosage followed by slowly tapering to a low-dosage maintenance corticosteroid regimens. It is recommended that affected individuals who fail this regimen or present with cardiogenic shock be treated with other non-specific immunosuppressive drugs viz., azathioprine or cyclophosphamide, as adjuncts to, or replacements for, corticosteroids. However, individuals with an underlying therapeutically accessible disease should be treated for this disease; in seriously symptomatic cases, such individuals may be treated concurrently with a corticosteroid regimen. Examples of diseases underlying eosinophilic myocarditis that are recommended for treatments directed at the underlying disease include

- Infectious agents: specific drug treatment of helminth and protozoan infections typically take precedence over non-specific immunosuppressive therapy, which, if used without specific treatment, could worsen the infection. In moderate-to-severe cases, non-specific immunosuppression is used in combination with specific drug treatment.
- Toxic reactions to ingested agents: discontinuance of the ingested agent plus corticosteroids or other non-specific immunosuppressive regimens.
- Clonal eosinophilia caused by mutations in genes that are highly susceptible to tyrosine kinase inhibitors such as PDGFRA, PDGFRB, or possibly FGFR1: first-generation tyrosine kinase inhibitors (e.g. imatinib) are recommended for the former two mutations; a later generation tyrosine kinase inhibitors, ponatinib, alone or combined with bone marrow transplantation, may be useful for treating the FGFR1 mutations.
- Clonal hypereosinophilia due to mutations in other genes or primary malignancies: specific treatment regimens used for these pre-malignant or malignant diseases may be more useful and necessary than non-specific immunosuppression.
- Allergic and autoimmune diseases: non-specific treatment regimens used for these diseases may be useful in place of a simple corticosteroid regimen. For example, eosinophilic granulomatosis with polyangiitis can be successfully treated with mepolizumab.
- Idiopathic hypereosinophilic syndrome and lymphocyte-variant hypereosinophilia: corticosteroids; for individuals with these hypereosinophilias that are refractory to or breakthrough corticosteroid therapy and individuals requiring corticosteroid-sparing therapy, recommended alternative drug therapies include hydroxyurea, Pegylated interferon-α, and either one of two tyrosine kinase inhibitors viz., imatinib and mepolizumab).

== Prognosis ==
The prognosis of eosinophilic myocarditis is anywhere from rapidly fatal to extremely chronic or non-fatal. Progression at a moderate rate over many months to years is the most common prognosis. In addition to the speed of inflammation-based heart muscle injury, the prognosis of eosinophilic myocarditis may be dominated by that of its underlying cause. For example, an underlying malignant cause for eosinophilia may be survival-limiting.

== History ==
In 1936, the famed Swiss physician Wilhem Löffler first described heart damage that appeared due to massive cardiac eosinophil infiltrations and was associated with excessively high levels of blood eosinophils. Subsequent cases of this disorder, termed Loeffler endocarditis, were found to occur in about 20% of individuals diagnosed with the hypereosinophilic syndrome. Loeffler's and the latter cases had pathological features of eosinophil infiltrations not only into the heart's myocardium but also its epicardium (i.e. lining of the heart chambers). Although eosinophilic myocarditis due to other underlying causes may show little or no eosinophil infiltrations into the endocardium, Loeffler endocarditis is considered an important form of the disorder.
