= Prurigo simplex =

Medical condition

Prurigo simplex is a term for a chronic, itchy, idiopathic skin condition.

== See also ==
- Pruritus
- Skin lesion
