= Eosinophilic vasculitis =

- Specialty: Dermatology

Eosinophilic vasculitis is a cutaneous condition characterized by an inflammation of blood vessels and the presence of eosinophils.

== See also ==
- Itchy red bump disease
- List of cutaneous conditions
