= Eosinophilic leukemia =

Types of eosinophilic leukemia include:

- Chronic eosinophilic leukemia
- Acute eosinophilic leukemia
- Clonal eosinophilia
