= Caprin-1 =

Protein found in humans

CAPRIN1
Available structures
PDB	Ortholog search: PDBe RCSB
PDB	List of PDB id codes 4WBE, 4WBP

Identifiers
- Aliases: CAPRIN1, GPIAP1, GPIP137, GRIP137, M11S1, RNG105, p137GPI, cell cycle associated protein 1
- External IDs: OMIM: 601178; MGI: 1858234; HomoloGene: 4310; GeneCards: CAPRIN1; OMA:CAPRIN1 - orthologs

Gene location (Human)
Chr.	Chromosome 11 (human)
Band	11p13	Start	34,051,731 bp
Band	11p13	End	34,102,610 bp

Gene location (Mouse)
Chr.	Chromosome 2 (mouse)
Band	2|2 E2	Start	103,593,286 bp
Band	2|2 E2	End	103,627,994 bp
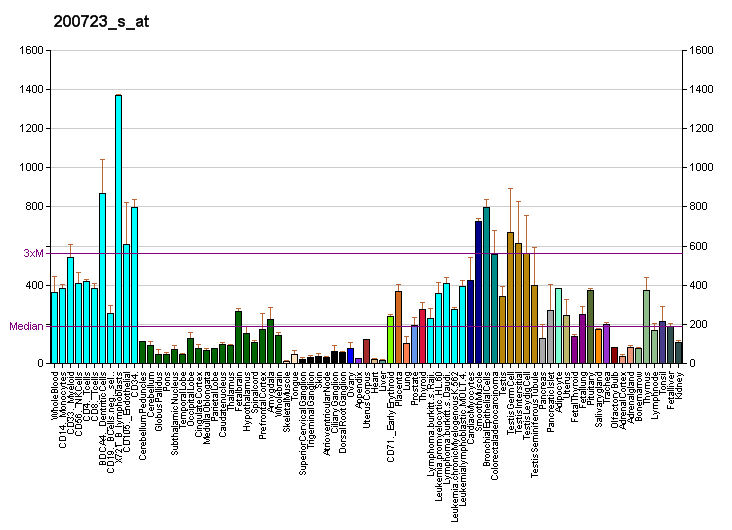

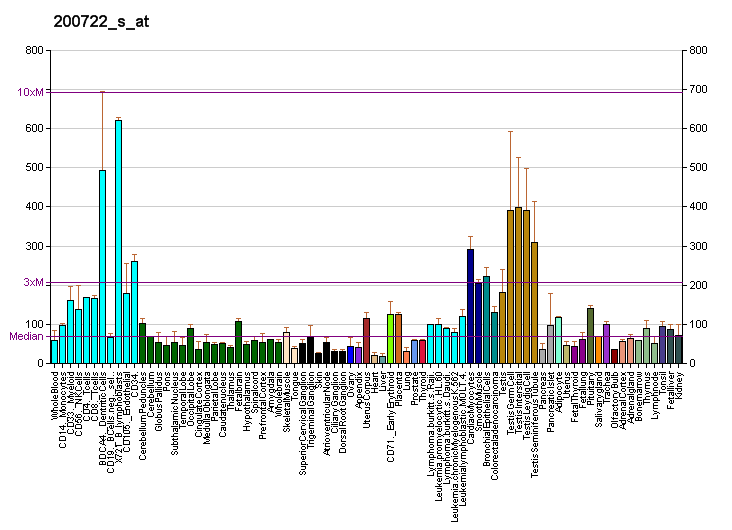
RNA expression pattern
Bgee	Human / Mouse (ortholog); Top expressed in: ganglionic eminence; ventricular zone; Achilles tendon; islet of Langerhans; endometrium; left testis; epithelium of colon; right testis; stromal cell of endometrium; gonad / Top expressed in: genital tubercle; tail of embryo; ureter; primitive streak; maxillary prominence; abdominal wall; external carotid artery; internal carotid artery; mandibular prominence; medullary collecting duct; More reference expression data
BioGPS	More reference expression data
Gene ontology
Molecular function	protein binding; RNA binding
Cellular component	cytoplasmic stress granule; dendrite; P-body; integral component of plasma membrane; cell projection; membrane; cytoplasm; cytosol; synapse
Biological process	cell differentiation; negative regulation of translation; positive regulation of dendrite morphogenesis; positive regulation of dendritic spine morphogenesis
Sources:Amigo / QuickGO
Orthologs
Species	Human	Mouse
Entrez	4076	53872
Ensembl	ENSG00000135387	ENSMUSG00000027184
UniProt	Q14444	Q60865
RefSeq (mRNA)	NM_005898; NM_203364	NM_001111289; NM_001111290; NM_001111291; NM_001111292; NM_016739
RefSeq (protein)	NP_005889; NP_976240	NP_001104759; NP_001104760; NP_001104761; NP_001104762; NP_058019
Location (UCSC)	Chr 11: 34.05 – 34.1 Mb	Chr 2: 103.59 – 103.63 Mb
PubMed search
- Wikidata
View/Edit Human	View/Edit Mouse

Caprin-1 is a protein that in humans is encoded by the CAPRIN1 gene. It is suggested that Caprin1 (a.k.a. RNG105) is essential for the formation of long-term memory.

== Clinical significance ==
In 2022, loss-of-function mutations of the CAPRIN1 gene were shown to result in an autosomal-dominant disorder. Patients having the newly discovered disorder suffer from language impairment, speech delay, intellectual disability, ADHD and autism spectrum disorder. Somatically, they have respiratory problems, limb/skeletal anomalies, developmental delay, feeding difficulties, seizures and ophthalmologic problems.
