= SPTBN1 =

Protein-coding gene in the species Homo sapiens

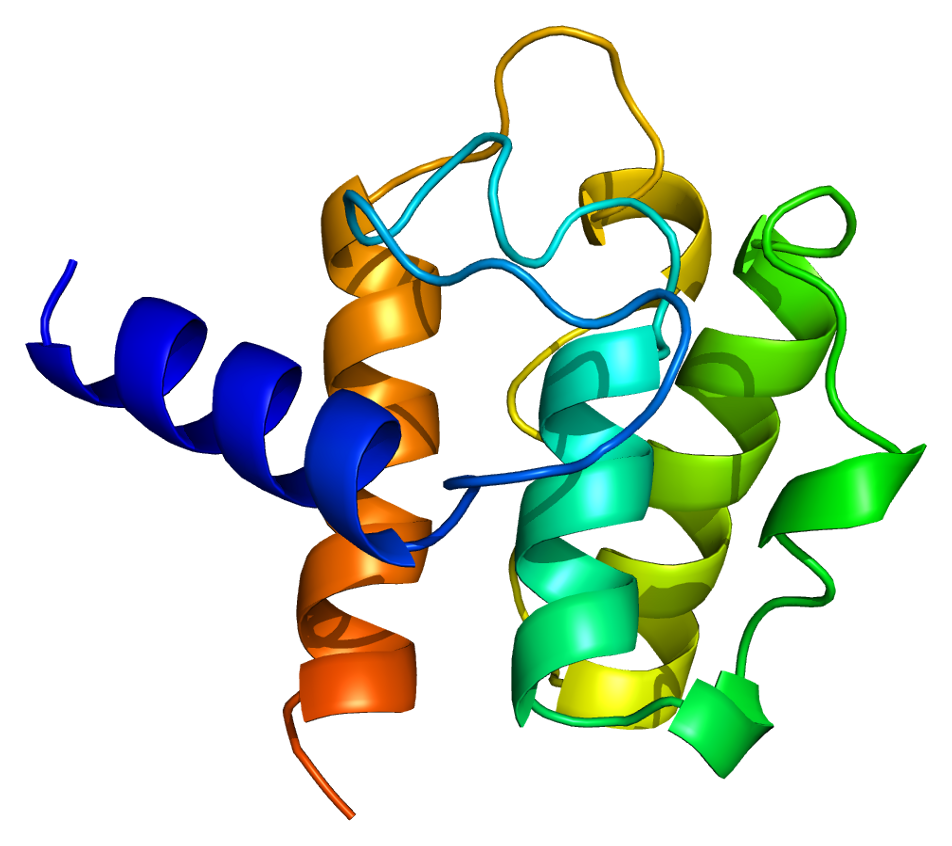

Identifiers
- Aliases: SPTBN1, ELF, HEL102, SPTB2, betaSpII, spectrin beta, non-erythrocytic 1, DDISBA
- External IDs: OMIM: 182790; MGI: 98388; GeneCards: SPTBN1
Available structures
PDB	Ortholog search: PDBe RCSB
PDB	List of PDB id codes 1AA2, 1BKR, 3EDV

Gene location (Human)
Chr.	Chromosome 2 (human)
Band	2p16.2	Start	54,456,317 bp
Band	2p16.2	End	54,671,446 bp

Gene location (Mouse)
Chr.	Chromosome 11 (mouse)
Band	11 A3.3|11 17.44 cM	Start	30,049,395 bp
Band	11 A3.3|11 17.44 cM	End	30,218,175 bp
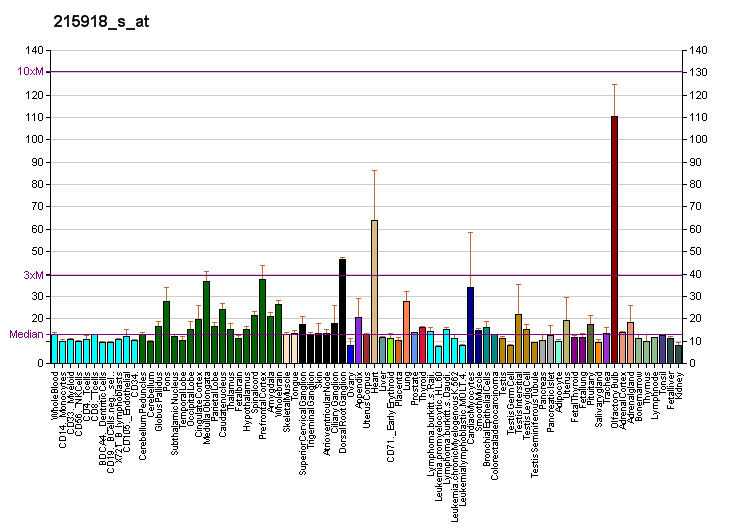

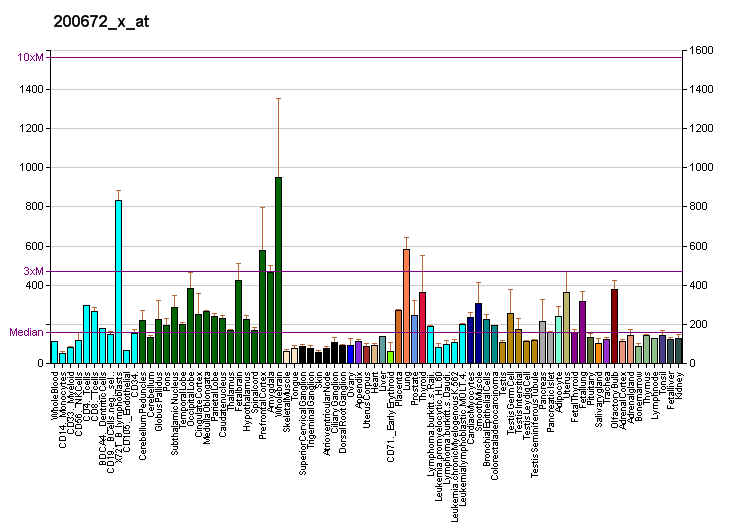

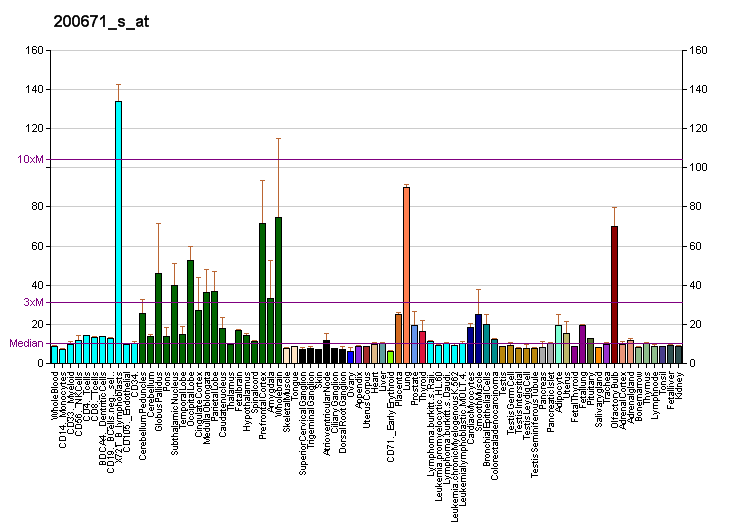
RNA expression pattern
Bgee	Human / Mouse (ortholog); Top expressed in: endothelial cell; trigeminal ganglion; skin of hip; lateral nuclear group of thalamus; pars compacta; external globus pallidus; synovial joint; dorsal motor nucleus of vagus nerve; superior vestibular nucleus; pars reticulata / Top expressed in: right lung; right lung lobe; facial motor nucleus; carotid body; left lung; iris; endothelial cell of lymphatic vessel; vestibular membrane of cochlear duct; anterior horn of spinal cord; gastrula; More reference expression data
BioGPS	More reference expression data
Gene ontology
Molecular function	calmodulin binding; structural constituent of cytoskeleton; protein binding; ankyrin binding; GTPase binding; actin binding; phospholipid binding; protein-containing complex binding; RNA binding; cadherin binding
Cellular component	cytoplasm; M band; cytosol; spectrin; membrane; cortical cytoskeleton; plasma membrane; cuticular plate; nucleolus; axolemma; spectrin-associated cytoskeleton; extracellular exosome; cytoskeleton; nucleus; postsynaptic density; protein-containing complex; postsynapse; glutamatergic synapse
Biological process	common-partner SMAD protein phosphorylation; mitotic cytokinesis; MAPK cascade; axon guidance; endoplasmic reticulum to Golgi vesicle-mediated transport; positive regulation of protein localization to plasma membrane; actin filament capping; plasma membrane organization; membrane assembly; regulation of protein localization to plasma membrane; Golgi to plasma membrane protein transport; cytoskeleton organization; protein localization to plasma membrane; regulation of molecular function; regulation of SMAD protein signal transduction
Sources:Amigo / QuickGO
Orthologs
Databases	NCBI: entry; OMA: entry
Species	Human	Mouse
Entrez	6711	20742
Ensembl	ENSG00000115306	ENSMUSG00000020315
UniProt	Q01082	Q62261
RefSeq (mRNA)	NM_003128; NM_178313	NM_009260; NM_175836
RefSeq (protein)	NP_003119; NP_842565	NP_033286; NP_787030
Location (UCSC)	Chr 2: 54.46 – 54.67 Mb	Chr 11: 30.05 – 30.22 Mb
PubMed search
- Wikidata
View/Edit Human	View/Edit Mouse

Spectrin beta chain, brain 1 is a protein that in humans is encoded by the SPTBN1 gene.

== Function ==
Spectrin is an actin crosslinking and molecular scaffold protein that links the plasma membrane to the actin cytoskeleton, and functions in the determination of cell shape, arrangement of transmembrane proteins, and organization of organelles. It is composed of two antiparallel dimers of alpha- and beta- subunits. This gene is one member of a family of beta-spectrin genes. The encoded protein contains an N-terminal actin-binding domain, and 17 spectrin repeats that are involved in dimer formation. Multiple transcript variants encoding different isoforms have been found for this gene.

== Interactions ==
SPTBN1 has been shown to interact with Merlin.
