= Giantin =

Protein-coding gene in the species Homo sapiens

GOLGB1

Identifiers
- Aliases: GOLGB1, GCP, GCP372, GOLIM1, golgin B1
- External IDs: OMIM: 602500; MGI: 1099447; GeneCards: GOLGB1

Gene location (Human)
Chr.	Chromosome 3 (human)
Band	3q13.33	Start	121,663,199 bp
Band	3q13.33	End	121,749,966 bp

Gene location (Mouse)
Chr.	Chromosome 16 (mouse)
Band	16|16 B3	Start	36,695,502 bp
Band	16|16 B3	End	36,753,447 bp
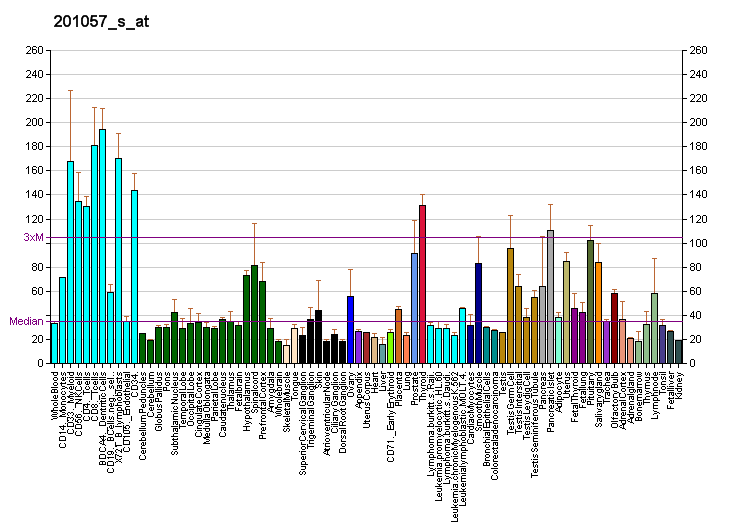

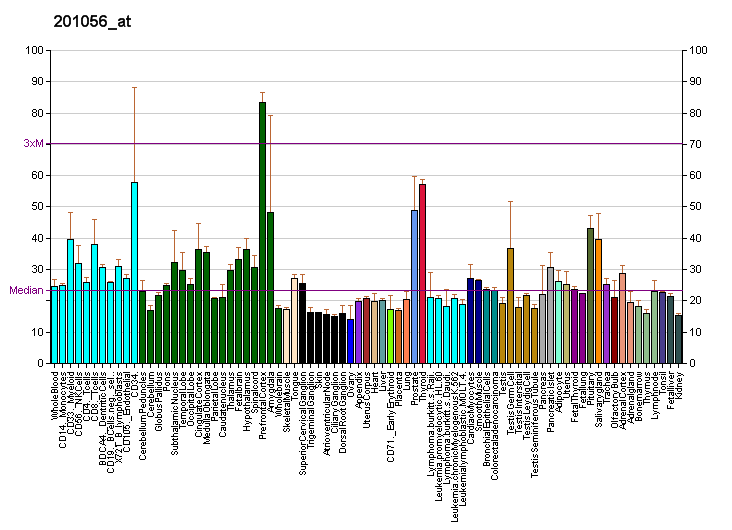
RNA expression pattern
Bgee	Human / Mouse (ortholog); Top expressed in: Achilles tendon; sural nerve; pancreatic ductal cell; parotid gland; tibia; epithelium of colon; sperm; body of pancreas; tendon of biceps brachii; skin of hip / Top expressed in: otolith organ; utricle; vestibular membrane of cochlear duct; lacrimal gland; hand; neural layer of retina; prostate; right kidney; lobe of prostate; genital tubercle; More reference expression data
BioGPS	More reference expression data
Gene ontology
Molecular function	protein binding; sequence-specific DNA binding; DNA-binding transcription factor activity; RNA binding
Cellular component	integral component of membrane; Golgi membrane; Golgi stack; cis-Golgi network; Golgi apparatus; membrane; endoplasmic reticulum-Golgi intermediate compartment
Biological process	endoplasmic reticulum to Golgi vesicle-mediated transport; Golgi organization; regulation of transcription, DNA-templated; protein localization to pericentriolar material
Sources:Amigo / QuickGO
Orthologs
Databases	NCBI: entry; OMA: entry
Species	Human	Mouse
Entrez	2804	224139
Ensembl	ENSG00000173230	ENSMUSG00000034243
UniProt	Q14789	n/a
RefSeq (mRNA)	NM_001256486; NM_001256487; NM_001256488; NM_004487; NM_001366282 NM_001366283; NM_001366284; NM_001389631	NM_030035
RefSeq (protein)	NP_001243415; NP_001243416; NP_001243417; NP_004478; NP_001353211 NP_001353212; NP_001353213	n/a
Location (UCSC)	Chr 3: 121.66 – 121.75 Mb	Chr 16: 36.7 – 36.75 Mb
PubMed search
- Wikidata
View/Edit Human	View/Edit Mouse

Giantin or Golgin subfamily B member 1 is a protein that in humans is encoded by the GOLGB1 gene.

== Structure ==
Giantin is a disulfide-linked homodimer which contains several (around 37) coiled-coiled domains.

== Function ==
GOLGB1 protein has been shown to interact with ACBD3 and with PLK3 and vesicle tethering small GTPases Rab1 and Rab6. Giantin also interacts with P115 at the N-terminal coils facilitating binding to the other Golgi matrix protein GM130 that is thought to be important for Golgi secretory function. Loss-of function studies of giantin have also suggested a role in primary cilia function and defective regulation of glycosyltransferase expression and calcineurin signalling in tissue culture cells.

Giantin is located at the cis-medial rims of the Golgi apparatus and is part of the Golgi matrix that is responsible for membrane trafficking in secretory pathway of proteins. This function is key for proper localisation of proteins at the plasma membrane and outside the cell (extracellular region) which is important for cell function that is dependent on for example receptors and the extracellular matrix function.

== Clinical significance ==
Recent animal model knockout studies of GOLGB1 in mice, rat, and zebrafish have shown that phenotypes are different between species ranging from mild to severe craniofacial defects in the rodent models to just minor size defects in zebrafish. However, in adult zebrafish a tumoral calcinosis-like phenotype was observed, and in humans such phenotype has been linked to defective glycosyltransferase function (e.g. GALNT3 protein).
