= CFU-Eos =

Colony forming unit that gives rise to eosinophils

Details
- Gives rise to: Eosinophils
- Location: Bone marrow
- Function: colony forming unit

Identifiers
- TH: H2.00.04.3.02010

CFU-Eo is a colony forming unit that gives rise to eosinophils. Some sources prefer the term "CFU-Eos". It is also known as "hEoP".
