= SPECC1 =

Protein-coding gene in the species Homo sapiens

Identifiers
- Aliases: SPECC1, CYTSB, HCMOGT-1, HCMOGT1, NSP, sperm antigen with calponin homology and coiled-coil domains 1, NSP5
- External IDs: OMIM: 608793; MGI: 2442356; HomoloGene: 45157; GeneCards: SPECC1; OMA:SPECC1 - orthologs

Gene location (Human)
Chr.	Chromosome 17 (human)
Band	17p11.2	Start	20,008,865 bp
Band	17p11.2	End	20,319,026 bp

Gene location (Mouse)
Chr.	Chromosome 11 (mouse)
Band	11|11 B2	Start	61,847,589 bp
Band	11|11 B2	End	62,113,839 bp
RNA expression pattern
Bgee	Human / Mouse (ortholog); Top expressed in: Achilles tendon; corpus callosum; C1 segment; sural nerve; testicle; globus pallidus; internal globus pallidus; external globus pallidus; substantia nigra; gonad / Top expressed in: blood; molar; motor neuron; fetal liver hematopoietic progenitor cell; lumbar subsegment of spinal cord; superior colliculus; inferior colliculi; cerebellar cortex; anterior horn of spinal cord; deep cerebellar nuclei; More reference expression data
BioGPS	n/a
Orthologs
Species	Human	Mouse
Entrez	92521	432572
Ensembl	ENSG00000128487	ENSMUSG00000042331
UniProt	Q5M775	Q5SXY1
RefSeq (mRNA)	NM_001033553; NM_001033554; NM_001033555; NM_001243438; NM_001243439 NM_152904; NM_001386077; NM_001386078; NM_001386079; NM_001386080; NM_001386081; NM_001386082; NM_001386083; NM_001386084; NM_001386085	NM_001029936; NM_001281818; NM_001310526
RefSeq (protein)	NP_001028725; NP_001028726; NP_001028727; NP_001230367; NP_001230368 NP_690868	NP_001025107; NP_001268747; NP_001297455
Location (UCSC)	Chr 17: 20.01 – 20.32 Mb	Chr 11: 61.85 – 62.11 Mb
PubMed search
- Wikidata
View/Edit Human	View/Edit Mouse

Cytospin-B is a protein that, in humans, is encoded by the CYTSB gene.
