= M-RIP =

Protein-coding gene in the species Homo sapiens

MPRIP

Identifiers
- Aliases: MPRIP, M-RIP, MRIP, RHOIP3, RIP3, p116Rip, myosin phosphatase Rho interacting protein
- External IDs: OMIM: 612935; MGI: 1349438; GeneCards: MPRIP

Gene location (Human)
Chr.	Chromosome 17 (human)
Band	17p11.2	Start	17,042,457 bp
Band	17p11.2	End	17,217,679 bp

Gene location (Mouse)
Chr.	Chromosome 11 (mouse)
Band	11|11 B1.3	Start	59,552,131 bp
Band	11|11 B1.3	End	59,671,686 bp
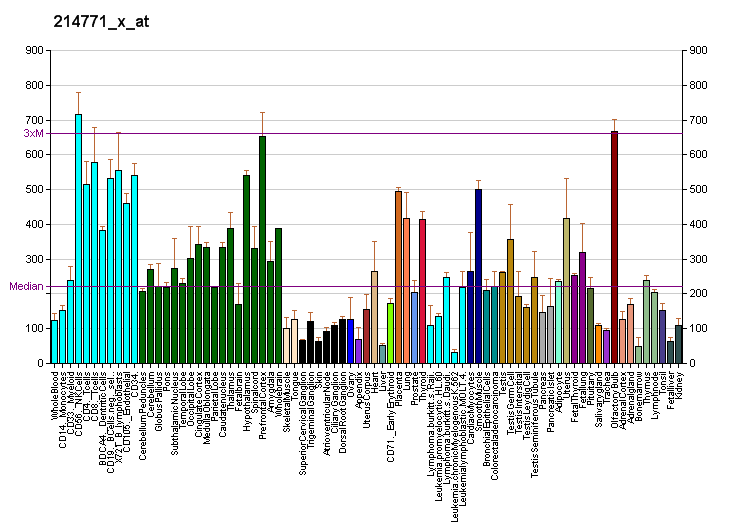

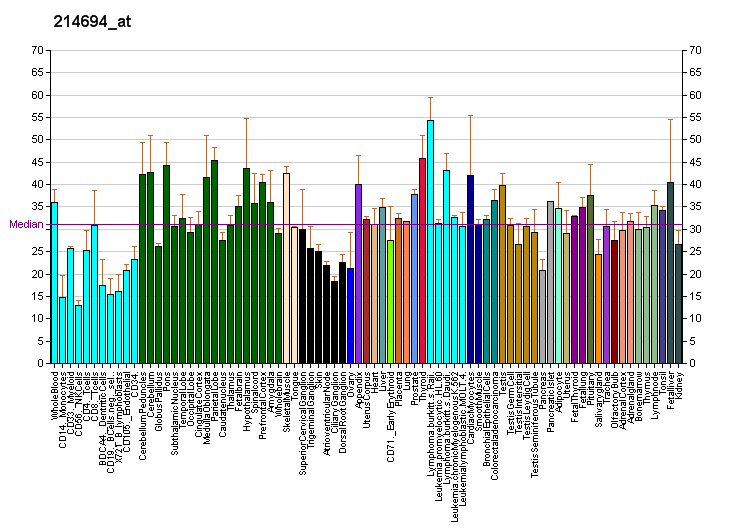

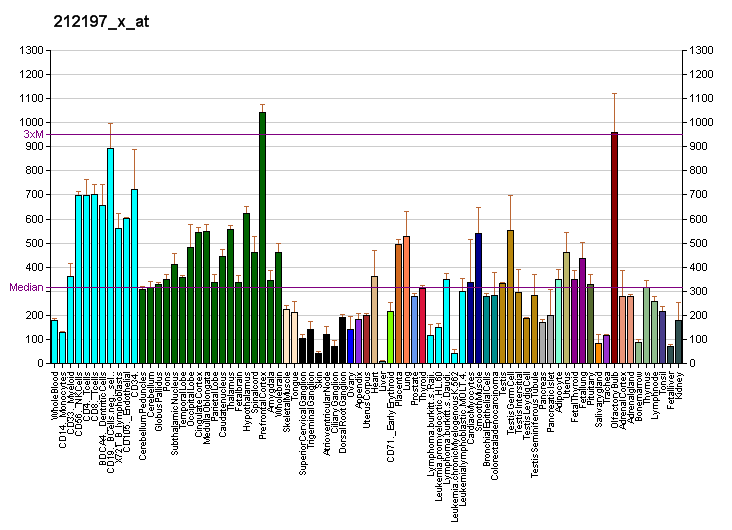
RNA expression pattern
Bgee	Human / Mouse (ortholog); Top expressed in: popliteal artery; tibial arteries; sural nerve; right coronary artery; amniotic fluid; olfactory bulb; saphenous vein; body of uterus; ganglionic eminence; buccal mucosa cell / Top expressed in: spermatid; CA3 field; lactiferous gland; ankle joint; entorhinal cortex; choroid plexus of fourth ventricle; perirhinal cortex; left lung; seminiferous tubule; right lung; More reference expression data
BioGPS	More reference expression data
Gene ontology
Molecular function	actin binding; protein binding; cadherin binding
Cellular component	cytoskeleton; focal adhesion; actin cytoskeleton; cytoplasm; cytosol
Biological process	cell-cell adhesion
Sources:Amigo / QuickGO
Orthologs
Databases	NCBI: entry; OMA: entry
Species	Human	Mouse
Entrez	23164	26936
Ensembl	ENSG00000133030	ENSMUSG00000005417
UniProt	Q6WCQ1	P97434
RefSeq (mRNA)	NM_015134; NM_201274; NM_001364716	NM_012027; NM_201245; NM_001368931
RefSeq (protein)	NP_055949; NP_958431; NP_001351645	NP_036157; NP_957697; NP_001355860
Location (UCSC)	Chr 17: 17.04 – 17.22 Mb	Chr 11: 59.55 – 59.67 Mb
PubMed search
- Wikidata
View/Edit Human	View/Edit Mouse

Myosin phosphatase Rho-interacting protein is an enzyme that in humans is encoded by the MPRIP gene.

== Interactions ==
M-RIP has been shown to interact with RHOA.
