= TRIP11 =

Protein-coding gene in the species Homo sapiens

Identifiers
- Aliases: TRIP11, ACG1A, CEV14, GMAP-210, TRIP-11, TRIP230, GMAP210, thyroid hormone receptor interactor 11, ODCD, ODCD1
- External IDs: OMIM: 604505; MGI: 1924393; GeneCards: TRIP11

Gene location (Human)
Chr.	Chromosome 14 (human)
Band	14q32.12	Start	91,965,991 bp
Band	14q32.12	End	92,040,896 bp

Gene location (Mouse)
Chr.	Chromosome 12 (mouse)
Band	12|12 E	Start	101,800,302 bp
Band	12|12 E	End	101,879,526 bp
RNA expression pattern
Bgee	Human / Mouse (ortholog); Top expressed in: Achilles tendon; testicle; buccal mucosa cell; epithelium of colon; stromal cell of endometrium; islet of Langerhans; sural nerve; gonad; body of pancreas; monocyte / Top expressed in: epithelium of small intestine; lacrimal gland; retinal pigment epithelium; substantia nigra; parotid gland; fossa; ciliary body; Paneth cell; Epithelium of choroid plexus; conjunctival fornix; More reference expression data
BioGPS	n/a
Gene ontology
Molecular function	transcription coactivator activity; protein binding
Cellular component	cytoplasm; inner acrosomal membrane; Golgi membrane; cis-Golgi network; Golgi apparatus; outer acrosomal membrane; cytoskeleton; membrane; acrosomal membrane; nucleus; transport vesicle; cilium; nuclear speck
Biological process	transcription by RNA polymerase II; ventricular septum development; bone development; inner ear receptor cell stereocilium organization; Golgi organization; chondrocyte differentiation involved in endochondral bone morphogenesis; protein glycosylation; intraciliary transport involved in cilium assembly; positive regulation of nucleic acid-templated transcription
Sources:Amigo / QuickGO
Orthologs
Databases	NCBI: entry; OMA: entry
Species	Human	Mouse
Entrez	9321	109181
Ensembl	ENSG00000100815	ENSMUSG00000021188
UniProt	Q15643	n/a
RefSeq (mRNA)	NM_004239; NM_001321851	NM_028446
RefSeq (protein)	NP_001308780; NP_004230	n/a
Location (UCSC)	Chr 14: 91.97 – 92.04 Mb	Chr 12: 101.8 – 101.88 Mb
PubMed search
- Wikidata
View/Edit Human	View/Edit Mouse

Thyroid receptor-interacting protein 11 is a protein that in humans is encoded by the TRIP11 gene.

== Function ==
TRIP11 was first identified through its ability to interact functionally with thyroid hormone receptor-beta (THRB; MIM 190160). It has also been found in association with the Golgi apparatus and microtubules.

== Interactions ==
TRIP11 has been shown to interact with Retinoblastoma protein and Thyroid hormone receptor alpha.
