= CCDC6 =

Protein-coding gene in humans

Identifiers
- Aliases: CCDC6, D10S170, H4, PTC, TPC, TST1, coiled-coil domain containing 6
- External IDs: OMIM: 601985; MGI: 1923801; HomoloGene: 34786; GeneCards: CCDC6; OMA:CCDC6 - orthologs

Gene location (Human)
Chr.	Chromosome 10 (human)
Band	10q21.2	Start	59,788,747 bp
Band	10q21.2	End	59,906,556 bp

Gene location (Mouse)
Chr.	Chromosome 10 (mouse)
Band	10|10 B5.3	Start	69,932,951 bp
Band	10|10 B5.3	End	70,029,030 bp
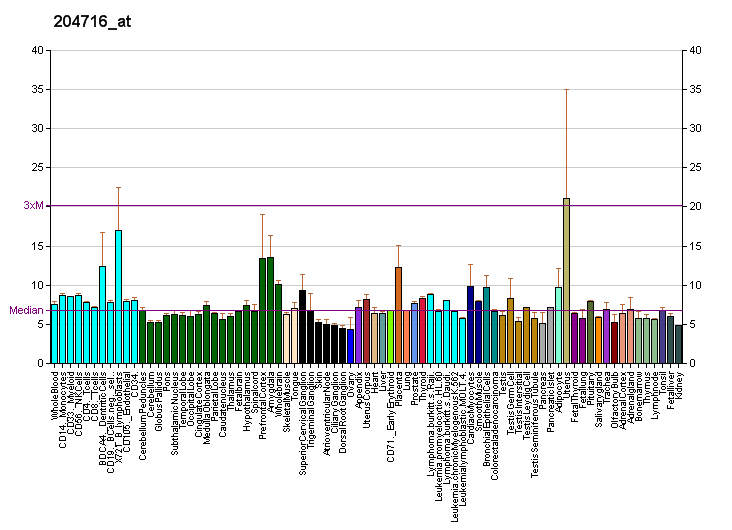
RNA expression pattern
Bgee	Human / Mouse (ortholog); Top expressed in: secondary oocyte; parotid gland; buccal mucosa cell; skin of thigh; skin of hip; middle temporal gyrus; saphenous vein; parietal pleura; caput epididymis; jejunal mucosa / Top expressed in: zygote; secondary oocyte; primary oocyte; vastus lateralis muscle; knee joint; tibialis anterior muscle; ankle; extensor digitorum longus muscle; triceps brachii muscle; gastrocnemius muscle; More reference expression data
BioGPS	More reference expression data
Gene ontology
Molecular function	SH3 domain binding; structural constituent of cytoskeleton; protein binding
Cellular component	cytoskeleton; cytoplasm; cytosol
Biological process	cytoskeleton organization; biological process
Sources:Amigo / QuickGO
Orthologs
Species	Human	Mouse
Entrez	8030	76551
Ensembl	ENSG00000108091	ENSMUSG00000048701
UniProt	Q16204	D3YZP9
RefSeq (mRNA)	NM_005436	NM_001111121
RefSeq (protein)	NP_005427	NP_001104591
Location (UCSC)	Chr 10: 59.79 – 59.91 Mb	Chr 10: 69.93 – 70.03 Mb
PubMed search
- Wikidata
View/Edit Human	View/Edit Mouse

Coiled-coil domain-containing protein 6 is a protein that in humans is encoded by the CCDC6 gene.

== Interactions ==
CCDC6 has been shown to interact with PPP4C.
