= IgG4-related disease =

- Other names: IgG4-related systemic disease
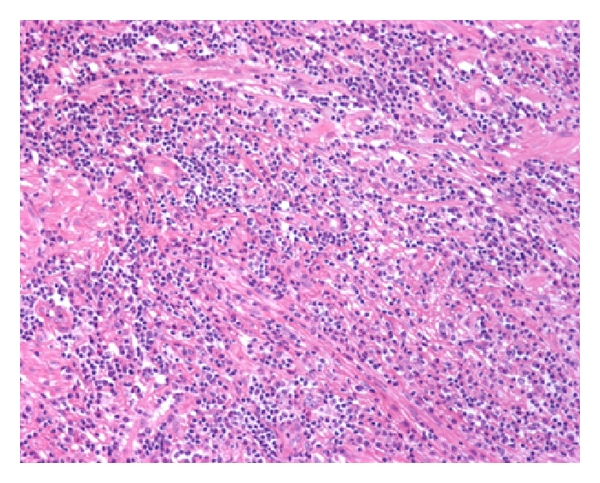
- Low power view of IgG4-related prostatitis. The prostatic stroma shows a dense inflammatory infiltrate and fibrosis (H&E, 100x)
- Specialty: Immunology/Rheumatology

IgG4-related disease (IgG4-RD), formerly known as IgG4-related systemic disease, is a chronic inflammatory condition characterized by tissue infiltration with lymphocytes and IgG4-secreting plasma cells, various degrees of fibrosis (scarring) and a usually prompt response to oral steroids. In approximately 51–70% of people with this disease, serum IgG4 concentrations are elevated during an acute phase.

It is a relapsing-remitting disease associated with a tendency to mass forming, tissue-destructive lesions in multiple sites, with a characteristic histopathological appearance in whichever site is involved. Inflammation and the deposition of connective tissue in affected anatomical sites can lead to organ dysfunction, organ failure, or even death if not treated.

Early detection is important to avoid organ damage and potentially serious complications. Treatment is recommended in all symptomatic cases of IgG4-RD and also in asymptomatic IgG4-RD involving certain anatomical sites.

== Signs and symptoms ==
IgG4-related disease has been described as an indolent condition. Although this may reflect opinion rather than objective assessment, symptoms, if any, are commonly described as mild in the medical literature. This can occur despite considerable underlying organ destruction. People are often described as generally well at diagnosis, although some may report weight loss. Pain is generally not a feature of inflammation. However, it may occur as a secondary effect, for example, due to either obstruction or compression.

Serum IgG4 concentrations greater than 135 mg/dL (1.35 g/L) constitute a serological criterion for IgG4-related disease, but are insufficient on their own to establish the diagnosis.

IgG4-related disease may present with painless swelling or mass lesions, or with complications such as obstructive jaundice caused by pancreatic or biliary involvement. Its manifestations can resemble other conditions; for example, prostatic involvement may cause lower urinary tract symptoms resembling those of benign prostatic enlargement or prostate cancer. Lesions may also be discovered incidentally on imaging and may be mistaken for malignancies.

Reported cases do include some significant symptoms or findings however:

System	Uncommon symptoms and complications
Neurological	Seizures, paralysis or hemiparesis, cranial nerve palsies, sensorineural hearing loss, pituitary hormone deficiencies
Eye	Loss of vision, proptosis
Cardiovascular	Constrictive pericarditis, heart block, ruptured aortic aneurysm, aortic dissection, carotid artery dissection, intracranial aneurysm, angina, sudden cardiac death
Respiratory	Airway obstruction, pleural effusion
Gastrointestinal	Esophageal obstruction, bowel obstruction
Urological	Renal failure, hydronephrosis, testicular pain

=== Individual organ manifestations ===
IgG4-RD can involve one or multiple sites in the body. With multiorgan involvement, the sites involved can be affected at the same time (synchronously) or at different unrelated periods (metachronously).

Several different diseases that have been known for many years are now considered to be manifestations of IgG4-RD. These include: type 1 autoimmune pancreatitis, interstitial nephritis, Riedel's thyroiditis, Mikulicz's disease, Küttner's tumor, inflammatory pseudotumors (in various sites of the body), mediastinal fibrosis and some cases of retroperitoneal fibrosis.

Nomenclature for individual organ involvement
Organ or site	Preferred names	Previously used names
Head and neck
Salivary gland	IgG4-related sialadenitis: IgG4-related submandibular gland disease, IgG4-related parotitis	Mikulicz's disease (salivary and lacrimal glands), chronic sclerosing sialadenitis, Küttner's tumour (submandibular glands)
Orbit	IgG4-related ophthalmic disease (IgG4-ROD) including: IgG4-related dacryoadenitis (lacrimal glands), IgG4-related orbital inflammation (or IgG4-related orbital inflammatory pseudotumor), IgG4-related orbital myositis (extraocular muscles), IgG4-related pan-orbital inflammation	Mikulicz's disease (salivary and lacrimal glands), Idiopathic orbital inflammatory disease, orbital pseudotumor
Paranasal sinuses		Chronic sinusitis, Eosinophilic angiocentric fibrosis (upper respiratory tract and orbit)
Pharynx	IgG4-related pharyngitis	
Thyroid gland	IgG4-related thyroid disease	Riedel's thyroiditis, Riedel's struma
Soft tissues of the head and neck		Idiopathic cervical fibrosis, sclerosing cervicitis, cervical fibrosclerosis
Central Nervous System
Pituitary gland	IgG4-related hypophysitis: IgG4-related panhypophysitis (all of pituitary gland), IgG4-related adenohypophysitis (anterior pituitary), IgG4-related infundibuloneurohypophysitis (posterior pituitary and pituitary stalk)	Autoimmune hypophysitis
Meninges	IgG4-related pachymeningitis (dura mater), IgG4-related leptomeningitis (arachnoid and pia mater)	Idiopathic hypertrophic pachymeningitis
Chest and abdomen
Pancreas	IgG4-related pancreatitis	Type 1 autoimmune pancreatitis, lymphoplasmacytic sclerosing pancreatitis, 'chronic pancreatitis with diffuse irregular narrowing of the main pancreatic duct'
Lung	IgG4-related lung disease	Pulmonary inflammatory pseudotumour
Pleura	IgG4-related pleuritis	
Liver	IgG4-related hepatopathy	
Bile duct	IgG4-related sclerosing cholangitis	
Gallbladder	IgG4-related cholecystitis	
Aorta (especially the infrarenal portion)	IgG4-related aortitis, IgG4-related periaortitis	Inflammatory aortic aneurysm, Chronic sclerosing aortitis, chronic periaortitis.
Branches of the aorta (including coronary, renal or iliac arteries)	IgG4-related periarteritis	
Pericardium	IgG4-related pericarditis	
Mediastinum	IgG4-related mediastinitis	Fibrosing mediastinitis, chronic sclerosing mediastinitis
Retroperitoneum	IgG4-related retroperitoneal fibrosis	Retroperitoneal fibrosis, Albarran-Ormond syndrome, Ormond's disease, perirenal fasciitis, Gerota's fasciitis/syndrome, periureteritis fibrosa, sclerosing lipogranuloma, sclerosing retroperitoneal granuloma, non-specific retroperitoneal inflammation, sclerosing retroperitonitis, retroperitoneal vasculitis with perivascular fibrosis.
Mesentery	IgG4-related mesenteritis (subtypes are: mesenteric panniculitis, mesenteric lipodystrophy and retractile mesenteritis)	Sclerosing mesenteritis, systemic nodular panniculitis, liposclerosis mesenteritis, mesenteric Weber–Christian disease, mesenteric lipogranuloma, xanthogranulomatous mesenteritis.
Breast	IgG4-related mastitis	Sclerosing mastitis
Genitourinary
Kidney	IgG4-related kidney disease (IgG4-RKD): IgG4-related tubulointerstitial nephritis (IgG4-TIN), membranous glomerulonephritis secondary to IgG4-related disease, IgG4 plasma cell arteritis IgG4-related renal pyelitis (renal pelvis)	Idiopathic hypocomplementemic tubulointerstitial nephritis
Prostate	IgG4-related prostatitis	
Vas deferens	IgG4-related perivasal fibrosis	Chronic orchialgia
Scrotum	IgG4-related paratesticular pseudotumor, IgG4-related epididymo-orchitis	Paratesticular fibrous pseudotumor, inflammatory pseudotumor of the spermatic cord, pseudosarcomatous myofibroblastic proliferations of the spermatic cord, proliferative funiculitis, chronic proliferative periorchitis, fibromatous periorchitis, nodular periorchitis, reactive periorchitis, fibrous mesothelioma
Other
Lymph nodes	IgG4-related lymphadenopathy	
Skin	IgG4-related skin disease	Angiolymphoid hyperplasia with eosinophilia, cutaneous pseudolymphoma
Nerve	IgG4-related perineural disease	

This is not a complete list, as IgG4-RD can involve any site in the body.

Other affected sites, confirmed on histology to be manifestations of IgG4-RD, include: heart; hard palate, esophagus, stomach, small intestine, rectum, adrenal gland, ovary, uterus, ureter, bladder, urachus, and synovium. Approximately 1/3 of cases exhibit increases in blood eosinophil counts, either eosinophilia or hypereosinophilia.

Radiologic evidence suggestive of involvement of the superior vena cava and seminal vesicle has been reported in confirmed cases of IgG4-RD.

== Histology ==
Whatever area of the body is involved, the hallmark histopathological features of IgG4-RD are:

1. A dense lymphoplasmacytic (lymphocytes and plasma cells) infiltrate rich in IgG4-positive plasma cells.
  - IgG4 immunostaining needs to be specifically requested and performed in order to detect IgG4-positive plasma cells.
2. Fibrosis, arranged at least focally in a "storiform" pattern.
  - "Storiform" is commonly referred to as meaning 'having a cartwheel pattern', but its literal meaning is the appearance of 'a woven mat [Latin: storea] (of rush or straw)'.
3. Obliterative phlebitis.
  - The venous channels are obliterated by a dense lymphoplasmacytic infiltrate, within both the venous walls and the lumen.

Other histopathological features associated with IgG4-RD are:

- Phlebitis without obliteration of the lumen.
- Tissue has increased numbers of eosinophils.

=== Submandibular gland research ===
In an article from 1977, histological research into 349 cases of Küttner's tumor (now known as 'IgG4-related sialadenitis') identified four distinct stages of the fibroinflammatory process:

- Stage 1: Focal periductal (around the salivary ducts) infiltration of lymphocytes
- Stage 2: Diffuse infiltration of lymphocytes and severe periductal fibrosis (scarring around the salivary ducts)
- Stage 3: Prominent infiltration of lymphocytes, atrophy of parenchyma (i.e. loss of functional areas due to shrinkage), and periductal sclerosis (scarring resulting in hardening around the salivary ducts)
- Stage 4: Marked loss of and sclerosis (hardening) of the parenchyma (functional area) - similar to the process involved in cirrhosis where there is shrinkage and loss of functional areas of the liver

This may reflect the inflammatory process and development of fibrosis that occurs in other organs involved in IgG4-RD.

== Diagnosis ==
Diagnosis requires tissue biopsy of an affected organ with characteristic histological findings, a comprehensive medical history and physical examination from a physician astute in new and evolving connective tissue diseases such as IgG4-RD.

Serum immunoglobulin G4 (IGG4) is often elevated, but this is not always the case. However, IgG4 blood lab levels greater than 135 are considered an evolving diagnostic criterion for disease suspicion

== Treatment ==
The goal of treatment is the induction and maintenance of remission so as to prevent progression of fibrosis and organ destruction in affected organ(s).

An international panel of experts have developed recommendations for the management of IgG4-RD. They concluded that in all cases of symptomatic, active IgG4-RD that treatment is required. Some cases with asymptomatic IgG4-RD also require treatment, as some organs tend to not cause symptoms until the late stages of disease. Urgent treatment is advised with certain organ manifestations, such as aortitis, retroperitoneal fibrosis, proximal biliary strictures, tubulointerstitial nephritis, pachymeningitis, pancreatic enlargement and pericarditis.

=== Induction of remission ===
In untreated patients with active disease, the recommended first-line agent for induction of remission is glucocorticoids unless contraindications exist. Glucocorticoids characteristically result in a rapid and often dramatic improvement in clinical features and often a resolution of radiographic features. However, where advanced fibrotic lesions have resulted in irreversible damage, the response to glucocorticoids and other current treatment options may be poor or even absent.

Although not validated yet in clinical trials, the common induction regime is prednisolone 30–40 mg per day for 2–4 weeks, then gradually tapered over 3 to 6 months. Recurrences during or after tapering of glucocorticoids are frequent, however. Steroid-sparing immunosuppressive agents might be considered, depending on local availability of these drugs, for use in combination with glucocorticoids from the start of treatment in order to reduce the side-effects of prolonged glucocorticoid usage. Steroid-sparing agents that have been used include rituximab, azathioprine, methotrexate, and cyclophosphamide, although trials are needed to ascertain the effectiveness of each drug in IgG4-RD.

=== Maintenance ===
Following a successful induction of remission, maintenance therapy might be given in some cases, for example when there is a high risk of relapse or in patients with organ-threatening manifestations. Common maintenance therapy is prednisolone 2.5–5 mg per day, or use of a steroid-sparing agent instead.

=== Relapse ===
Relapses are common, and a previous history of relapse appears to be a strong predictor of future relapse. When relapse occurs while off therapy and there has been a prolonged disease remission following initial glucocorticoid induction, then the relapse can usually be managed successfully with a re-induction strategy using glucocorticoids. Introducing a steroid-sparing agent might also need to be considered for relapses; however, none has been tested in prospective, controlled studies, and evidence for their efficacy beyond that offered by concomitant glucocorticoid therapy is scarce.

In one retrospective cohort study, baseline concentrations of serum IgG4, IgE and blood eosinophils were found to be independently predictive of relapse risk following treatment with rituximab with or without glucocorticoids; the higher the baseline values, the greater the relapse risk and the shorter the time to relapse.

=== Other interventions ===
When organ involvement causes local mechanical problems, further organ-specific interventions may be necessary. For example, when a tumefactive lesion causes obstruction of the bile duct, it may be necessary to insert a biliary stent to allow the bile to drain freely.

Similarly, ureteral or vascular stents, surgical resection or radiotherapy may be considered for various different presenting problems.

=== Trials ===
Research is also underway to evaluate the effect and safety of plasmablast-directed therapy with a monoclonal antibody (XmAb5871, obexelimab) which inhibits B-cell function without depleting these immune cells.

== Epidemiology ==
As recognition of IgG4-RD is relatively recent, there are limited studies on its epidemiology. It is therefore difficult to make an accurate estimation of prevalence. Furthermore, age of onset is almost impossible to estimate; age at diagnosis is frequently misused as the age of onset.

A 2011 study estimated the incidence of IgG4-RD in Japan at 2.8–10.8/million population, with a median age of onset of 58 years. Another study based on United States healthcare administrative claims data estimated the prevalence of IgG4-RD at 5.3/100,000 (about 1/20,000).

== Nomenclature ==
Names previously used for IgG4-RD:
IgG4-related systemic disease (IgG4-RSD)
IgG4-related sclerosing disease
IgG4-related systemic sclerosing disease
IgG4-related autoimmune disease
IgG4-associated multifocal systemic fibrosis
IgG4-associated disease
IgG4 syndrome
Hyper-IgG4 disease
Systemic IgG4-related plasmacytic syndrome
IgG4-positive multiorgan lymphoproliferative syndrome

Prior to 2011, IgG4-RD used to get mentioned in the medical literature under various different names. In addition, there are a number of historical reports in the literature of disease associations, which, in retrospect are likely to have been different manifestations of IgG4 disease. For example, Banerjee et al[1989] reported two patients with autoimmune hepatitis and febrile panniculitis. On each occasion the panniculitis responded to increasing the doses of prednisolone.

At the International Symposium on IgG4-Related Diseases, the consensus name of IgG4-related disease was endorsed for the condition. This name had already been agreed upon as a consensus name among Japanese investigators, notably choosing not to use the term 'systemic' as that might lead to malignant tumours in other organs getting incorrectly diagnosed as being just another manifestation of the IgG4-related condition.

However, some experts at the international symposium did express reservations about naming the disease after IgG4, as its role in pathogenesis is questionable and the use of serum IgG4 concentrations as a biomarker is unreliable.

An expanded term, 'Immunoglobulin G4-related disease', has sometimes been used also. However, this term was never referenced in the 2012 recommendations for nomenclature, and its use would appear to be erroneous.

== See also ==
- IgG4-related ophthalmic disease
- IgG4-related prostatitis
- IgG4-related skin disease
