= IgG4-related prostatitis =

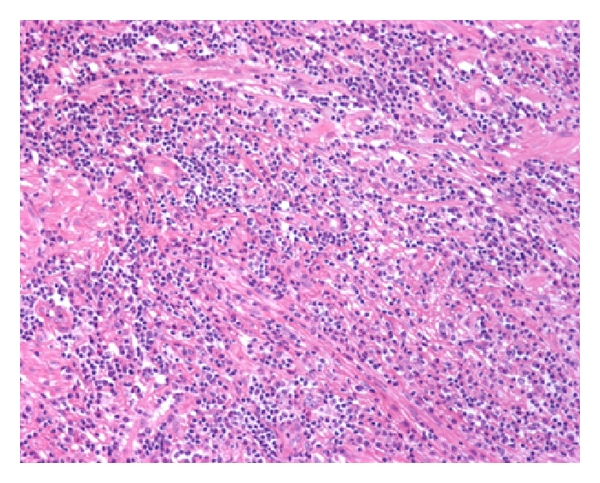
- Low power view of IgG4-related prostatitis. The prostatic stroma shows a dense inflammatory infiltrate and fibrosis (H&E, 100x)
- Specialty: Urology/Immunology

IgG4-related prostatitis is prostate involvement in men with IgG4-related disease (IgG4-RD), which is an emerging fibroinflammatory disease entity which is characterised (i) by a tendency to mass forming lesions in multiple sites of the body and (ii) by usually a prompt response to steroid therapy.

Men with IgG4-related prostatitis may also present with manifestations of IgG4-RD at other sites anywhere in the body; involvement of different areas of the body can occur either at the same time (synchronously) or at different periods of time (metachronously).

== Presentation ==
Several case studies on IgG4-related prostatitis have been reported. Patients have been noted to commonly present with lower urinary tract symptoms such as dysuria, pollakisuria, urinary urgency, and a feeling of incomplete emptying. The clinical presentation is similar to that in benign prostatic hyperplasia or chronic prostatitis, although pain, as occurs in CP/CPPS, does not usually appear to be significant.

== Histology ==
The diagnosis of IgG4-related prostatitis could be made from histological examination if prostate biopsy or surgery has been performed. The hallmark histopathological features of established IgG4-related disease are storiform fibrosis, a dense lymphoplasmacytic (lymphocytes and plasma cells) infiltrate rich in IgG4-positive plasma cells, and obliterative phlebitis.

However, identification depends on whether or not urologists and pathologists are aware of IgG4-related prostatitis/disease, as special immunostaining is required to identify the characteristic IgG4-positive plasma cells infiltration in prostatic tissue.

== Diagnosis ==
Men with IgG4-related prostatitis may have similar findings to those that are frequently, but not always, seen in other organ manifestations of IgG4-related disease, such as elevated blood levels of IgG4, IgE and eosinophils.

FDG-PET scans have been reported to be useful as a diagnostic modality for detecting IgG4-related prostatitis in men with IgG4-RD.

== Treatment ==
IgG4-related disease responds well, and often dramatically, to glucocorticoid therapy, provided that advanced fibrotic lesions have not resulted in irreversible damage, and this has included resolution of radiologic findings. Men given glucocorticoids to treat IgG4-related disease at other anatomical sites sometimes report relief of their lower urinary tract symptoms, suggesting that IgG4-related prostatitis may be underdiagnosed.

Cases are however likely to get misdiagnosed as benign prostatic hyperplasia and to get treated alternatively with medications such as alpha blockers. The efficacy of alpha blockers in IgG4-related prostatitis remains unclear.

== See also ==
- IgG4-related disease
