= List of medical abbreviations: I =

Sortable table
Abbreviation	Meaning
^{131}I or I131	iodine-131 (aka radioactive iodine or radioiodine)
IA	intra-arterial
IA	intra-articular
IAA	insulin autoantibody
IABP	intra-aortic balloon pump
IADL	instrumental activity of daily living
IADLs	instrumental activities of daily living
IAI	intra-amniotic infection
IBC	inflammatory breast cancer
IBD	inflammatory bowel disease
IBS	irritable bowel syndrome
IC	ileocecal
IC	immunocompromised
IC	informed consent
IC	intensive care
IC	interstitial cystitis
IC	immune complex
IC	intracardiac
ICC	immunocytochemistry
ICD	implantable cardioverter-defibrillator
ICD	intercostal drain
ICDS	Integrated Child Development Services Program
ICD-10	International Classification of Diseases, 10th Revision
ICF	intracellular fluid
ICG	impedance cardiography
ICH	intracerebral hemorrhage
ICI	intracervical insemination
ICM	ischemic cardiomyopathy
ICP	intracranial pressure
ICS	intercostal space
ICS	inhaled corticosteroids
ICS	internal carotid stenosis
ICSI	intracytoplasmic sperm injection
ICCU	intensive cardiac care unit
ICU	intensive care unit
ID	identifying data
ID	infectious disease
ID	infectious dose
ID	intellectual disability
I&D	incision and drainage (how to treat an abscess)
IDA	iron deficiency anemia
IDC	idiopathic dilated cardiomyopathy
IDC	indwelling catheter
IDC	infiltrating ductal carcinoma
IDDM	insulin-dependent diabetes mellitus (now called diabetes mellitus type 1)
IDL	intermediate-density lipoprotein
IDP	infectious disease precautions
IE	infective endocarditis
IF	immunofluorescence
IFG	impaired fasting glycaemia
Ig	immunoglobulin
IgA	immunoglobulin A
IgAV	IgA vasculitis (formerly known as Henoch–Schönlein purpura)
IgD	immunoglobulin D
IgE	immunoglobulin E
IGF	insulin-like growth factor
IgG	immunoglobulin G
IgG4-RD	IgG4-related disease
IgG4-RKD	IgG4-related kidney disease
IgG4-ROD	IgG4-related ophthalmic disease
IgG4-TIN	IgG4-related tubulointerstitial nephritis
IgM	immunoglobulin M
IGT	impaired glucose tolerance
IHC	immunohistochemistry
IHD	ischaemic heart disease
IHPS	infantile hypertrophic pyloric stenosis
IHSS	idiopathic hypertrophic subaortic stenosis (hypertrophic cardiomyopathy)
II	intellectual impairment
IIEF	International Index of Erectile Function
ILD	interstitial lung disease
ILI	Influenza-like illness
IM	intramuscular
IMA	inferior mesenteric artery
IMB	intermenstrual bleed (bleeding between periods)
IMI	intramuscular injection
IMM	intramyometrial
IMN	infectious mononucleosis
IMN	intramedullary nail
IMRT	intensity-modulated radiotherapy
IMT	inflammatory myofibroblastic tumor
IMT	intima-media thickness
IMV	intermittent mandatory ventilation (see mechanical ventilation)
Inc	incomplete
INF(-α/-β/-γ)	interferons -α/-β/-γ
INFX	infection
INH	inhaled
INH	Isoniazid
Inj	injection
INR	international normalized ratio
Int	internal
INT	intermittent needle therapy
IO	intraosseous infusion
I&O	input/intake and output
IODM	infant of diabetic mother
IOL	induction of labor
IOL	intraocular lens
IOP	intra-occular pressure
IP	interphalangeal joint
iPSCs	induced pluripotent stem cells
IPF	idiopathic pulmonary fibrosis
IPG	Implantable Pulse Generator
IPH	intraparenchymal hemorrhage or intraperitoneal hemorrhage or idiopathic pulmonary hemosiderosis
IPMN	Intraductal papillary mucinous neoplasm
IPPB	intermittent positive pressure breathing (see mechanical ventilation)
IPPV	intermittent positive pressure ventilation (see mechanical ventilation)
IPS	intraperitoneal sounds
IQ	intelligence quotient
IR	insulin resistance
IR	interventional radiology
IRDS	infant respiratory distress syndrome
IRIDA	inherited iron-refractory iron deficiency anemia
IRIS	Immune reconstitution inflammatory syndrome
IS	Incentive Spirometry
ISA	intrinsic sympathomimetic activity
ISDN	isosorbide dinitrate
ISH	isolated systolic hypertension
ISMN	isosorbide mononitrate
ISQ	no change (from Latin, in status quo)
IT	immature teratoma
IT	intrathecal
ITP	idiopathic thrombocytopenic purpura
ITP	immune-mediated thrombocytopenic purpura
ITU	intensive treatment unit (or intensive therapy unit)
IUCD	intrauterine contraceptive device
IU	international units
IUD	intrauterine death
IUD	intrauterine device
IUFD	intrauterine foetal demise
IUGR	intrauterine growth restriction
IUI	intrauterine insemination
IUP	intrauterine pregnancy
IUPC	intrauterine pressure catheter
IUS	intrauterine system
IUT	intrauterine transfusion
IV	intravenous
IVC	inferior vena cava
IVD	Intervertebral disc
IV-DSA	intravenous digital subtraction angiography
IVDU	intravenous drug user
IVF	in vitro fertilization
IVF	intravenous fluids
IVH	intraventricular hemorrhage
IVIG	intravenous immunoglobulin
IVP	intravenous pyelogram
IVPB	intravenous piggyback (i.v. short-term infusion)
IVPG	Intravenous pyogenic granuloma
IVSS	Intravenous Soluset
IVU	intravenous urogram
IVUS	intravascular ultrasound
Ix	Investigation(s)
