= Joaquín Albarrán =

Cuban urologist (1860–1912)

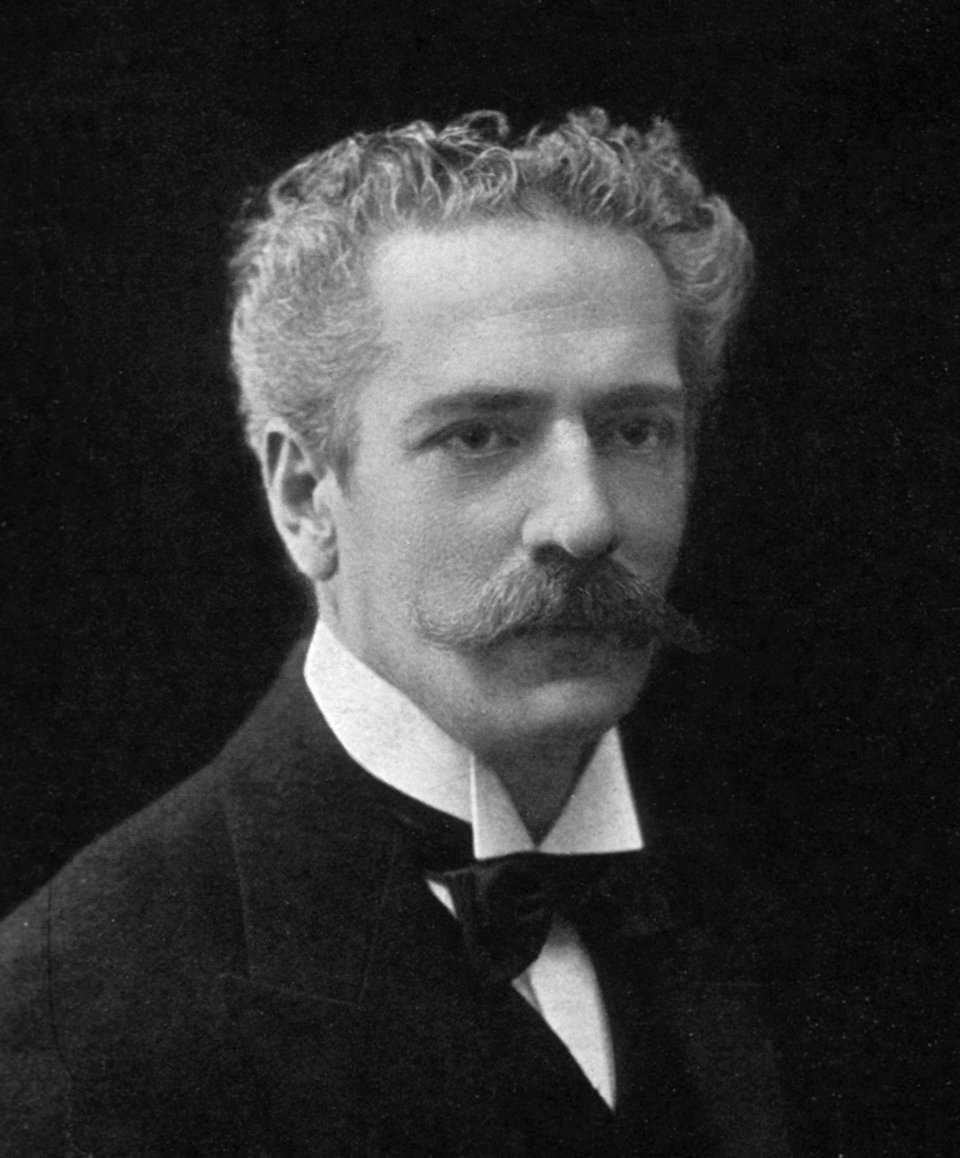
Joaquin Maria Albarrán y Dominguez

Joaquín Albarrán, full name Joaquin Maria Albarrán y Dominguez (May 9, 1860 – January 17, 1912) was a Cuban urologist born in Sagua La Grande, Cuba. He received the Order of the Legion of Honour of France.

== Biography ==
He studied medicine in Havana and Barcelona, earning his medical licence in 1877. Afterwards, he relocated to Paris, where he studied histology with Louis-Antoine Ranvier (1835–1922). In Paris, he interned under several renowned physicians, including urologist Jean Casimir Félix Guyon (1831–1920), who served as an important influence to Albarrán's career. In 1892 he became professeur agrégé, followed by chirurgien des hôpitaux two years later. In 1906 he succeeded Guyon as director of the clinic of urology at Hôpital Necker.

Albarrán's early career was largely spent in the fields of microbiology and histopathology, later switching to urology, a discipline in which he made several important contributions. He performed the first perineal prostatectomy in France, and is credited with introducing the so-called "Albarrán lever", a device used for adjusting the movements of a cystoscope during the catheterization of the ureter. In 1912 he was nominated for a Nobel Prize in Medicine.

== Associated eponyms ==
- Albarran-Ormond syndrome: Inflammatory retroperitoneal fibrosis, usually associated with urinary obstruction. Named with American urologist John Kelso Ormond (1886–1978); also known as "Gerota’s syndrome", after Romanian anatomist and urologist Dimitrie Gerota (1867–1939).
- Albarran's glands: Tiny submucosal glands or branching tubules in the subcervical area of the prostate gland.
- Albarran's sign: A sign of cancer in the pelvis renalis.
- Albarran bridge: also known as Albarran deflector, a urological endoscopic instrument, attached to a cystoscope, helping to guide more precisely stents, ureteric catheters, guidewires, needles, etc.

== Written works ==
- Anatomie et physiologie pathologique de la rétention de l’urine. With Jean Casimir Felix Guyon (1831–1920), 1890.
- Sur un série de quarante opérations pratiqués sur la rein. Revue de chirurgie, 1896, 16: 882–884. First planned nephrostomy.
- Médecine opératoire des voies urinaires. Paris, Masson & Cie., 1909. His best written effort. Albarran was the first surgeon in France to perform a perineal prostatectomy.
