= IgG4-related skin disease =

- Specialty: Dermatology

IgG4-related skin disease is the recommended name for skin manifestations in IgG4-related disease (IgG4-RD). Multiple different skin manifestations have been described.

== Classification ==
Although a clear understanding of the various skin lesions in IgG4-related disease is a work in progress, skin lesions have been classified into subtypes based on documented cases:

- Angiolymphoid hyperplasia with eosinophilia (or lesions that mimic it) and cutaneous pseudolymphoma
- Cutaneous plasmacytosis (Note: Some do not consider cutaneous plasmacytosis to be a feature of IgG4-related disease for reasons that include: a lack of systemic features, no response to steroid therapy and a different histological pattern.)
- Eyelid swelling (as part of Mikulicz's disease)
- Psoriasis-like eruptions
- Unspecified maculopapular or erythematous eruptions
- Hypergammaglobulinemic purpura and urticarial vasculitis
- Impaired blood supply to fingers or toes, leading to Raynaud's phenomenon or gangrene

In addition, Wells syndrome has also been reported in a case of IgG4-related disease.

== See also ==
- IgG4-related disease

== Note ==
Note:
