= Storiform pattern =

Structural pattern of biological tissue

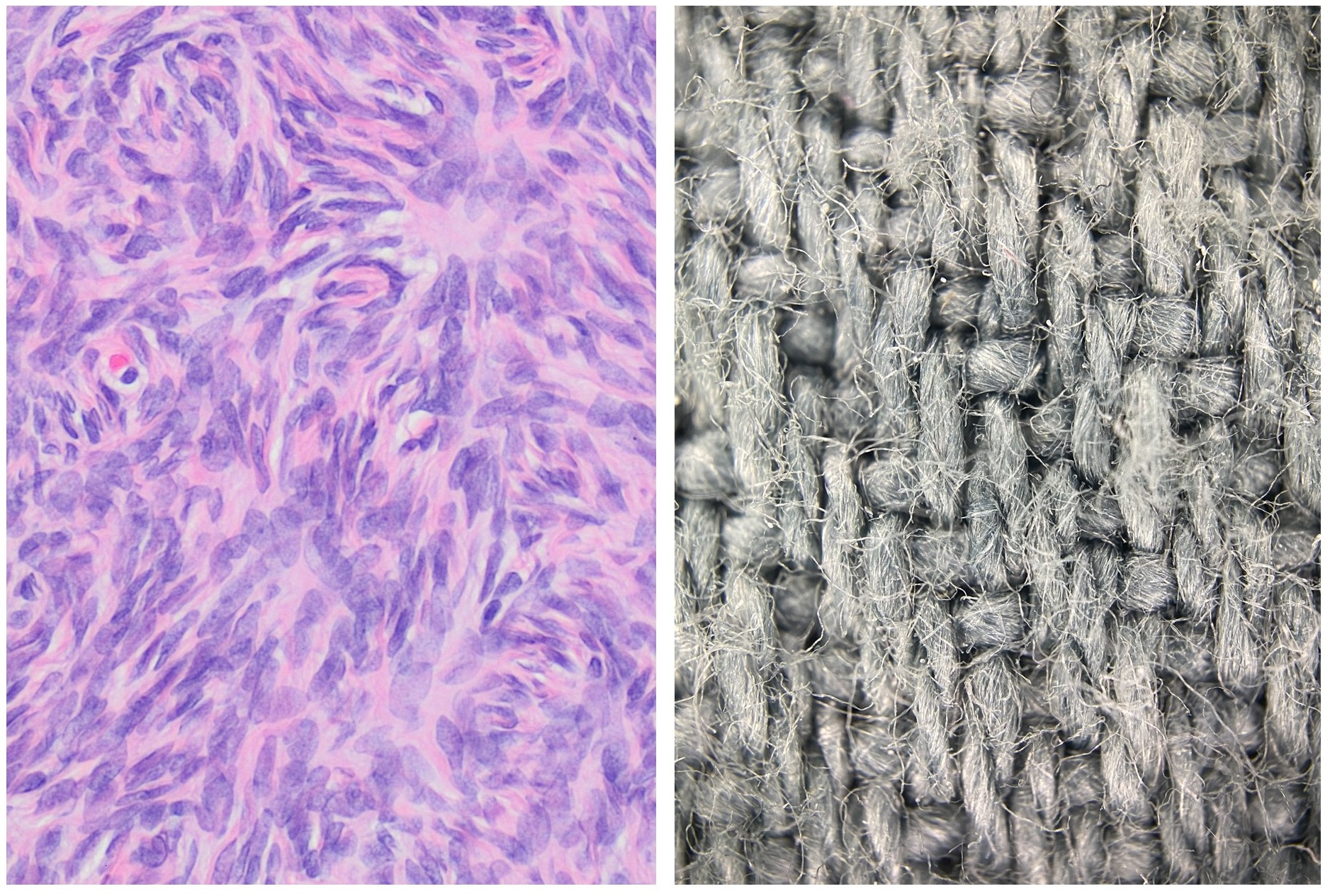
Woven or storiform pattern: Elongated cells or nuclei wherein small bundles are aligned in an otherwise haphazard pattern. Woven fabric is shown for comparison.

A woven or storiform pattern is a histopathologic architectural pattern. The name "storiform" originates from Latin storea 'woven', as storiform tissue tends to resemble woven fabric on microscopy.

Storiform fibrosis is a histologic sign of IgG4-related disease, accompanied by a dense lymphoplasmocytic infiltrate, often a partially eosinophilic infiltrate and obliterative phlebitis.

== See also ==
- Histopathology, for additional patterns
