= Collapsed vein =

Medical injury

Collapsed veins are a common injury that results from repeated use of intravenous injections.

They can result from intravenous chemotherapy or when injection conditions are less than ideal, such as in the context of drug abuse.

== Causes ==
Dehydration can cause temporary vein collapse.

Permanent vein collapse occurs as a consequence of:

- Repeated injections, especially with blunt needles.
- Poor injection technique.
- Injection of substances which irritate the veins; in particular, fluids that are hypertonic (high osmolality), vasoactive, irritants, with an extreme pH (very acidic or alkaline), many chemotherapeutic drugs or liquid methadone intended for oral use.

Smaller veins may collapse as a consequence of too much suction being used when pulling back against the syringe's plunger to check that the needle is in the vein. This will pull the sides of the vein together and, especially if inflamed, they may stick together causing the vein to block. Removing the needle too quickly after injecting can have a similar effect.

== Mechanism ==
Veins may become temporarily blocked if the internal lining of the vein swells in response to repeated injury or irritation. This may be caused by the needle, the substance injected, or donating plasma.

Individual endothelial cells may change the structure of their cytoskeleton when a vein collapses to better deal with the increased shear stress.

== Prognosis ==
Once endothelial swelling subsides, circulation will often become re-established. Collapsed veins may never recover. Many smaller veins are created by the body to circulate the blood, but they are not adequate for injections or IVs.

Research into solutions for patients with difficult venous access continues.

== See also ==
- Phlebitis
