= Dimitrie Gerota =

Romanian physician

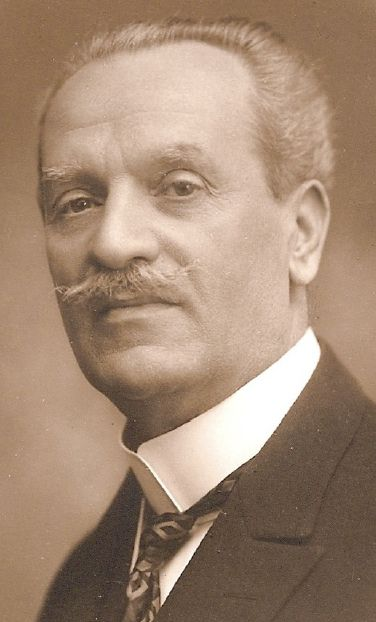
Dimitrie Gerota

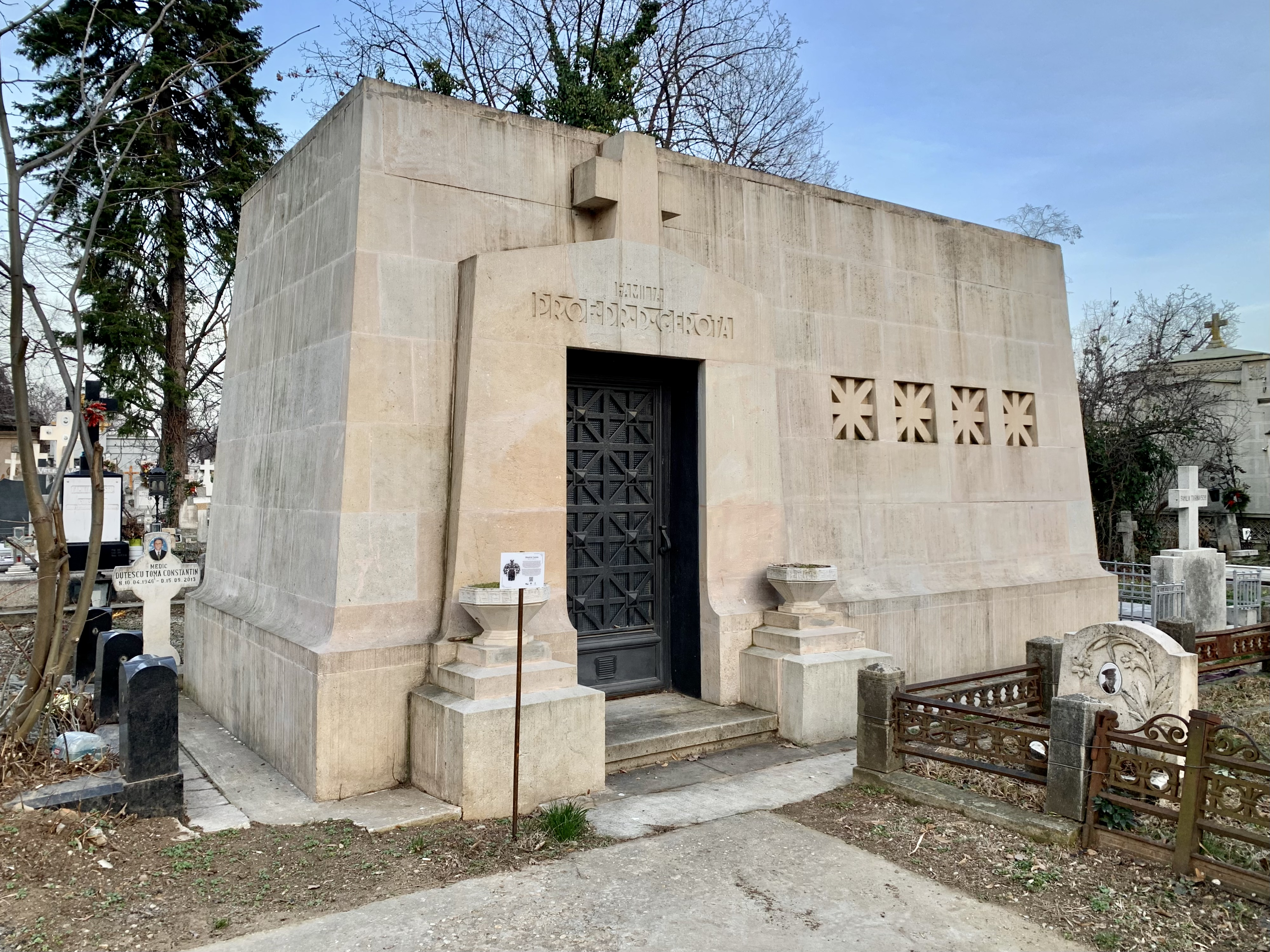
Crypt in the Bellu Cemetery

Dimitrie D. Gerota (pronounced [dʒeˈrota], 17 July 1867 – 3 March 1939) was a Romanian anatomist, physician, radiologist, urologist, and corresponding member of the Romanian Academy from 1916.

== Biography ==
He was born in Craiova, the son of a priest, Dimitrie Constantin Gerota (1841–?), and Maria Gerota, born Surpăteanu (1847–?). He studied at the Carol I High School in Craiova. In 1886, he entered the Faculty of Medicine at the University of Bucharest, graduating with an M.D. degree in 1892. For four years, he pursued his studies in Paris and Berlin. After returning to Bucharest, he started practicing medicine and teaching at various institutions.

Starting in October 1897, he taught anatomy at the National School of Fine Arts in Bucharest. In the fall of 1898, he and his student Constantin Brâncuși produced the carved muscles anatomical study entitled the Ecorché, based on research done in the dissection room of the Faculty of Medicine and the Museum of Comparative Anatomy. In May 1903, the flayed study was exhibited at the Romanian Athenaeum; the Society of Students of Fine Arts petitioned Spiru Haret, the minister of Education and Culture, to acquire it. Since then, generations of Romanian art and medical students have studied anatomy from plaster casts made from the Ecorché.

Considered to be the first Romanian radiologist, Gerota initiated academic radiology education in that country. In 1898, he wrote the book Rad̦ele lui Röntgen sau rad̦ele X (The Röntgen Rays or the X-Rays). Some years later, he had to abandon radiology because of radiodermatitis of the hand, which required amputation.

In 1909, he established a sanatorium, where he practiced surgery, and carried out charitable work. From 1913, he was a professor of surgical anatomy and experimental surgery at the University of Bucharest.

In November 1935, he submitted the article "Monarhie cu camarilă sau republică" (Monarchy with a Camarilla or a Republic) to the newspaper Universul. The article, highly critical of King Carol II, was censored, and Gerota was arrested and sent to Malmaison Prison in Bucharest. After protests by medical students, he was liberated four days later. He was arrested again in 1936, and sent to Jilava Prison. Set free, he died in 1939 in Bucharest and was buried in Bellu Cemetery.

== Legacy ==
Gerota researched the anatomy and physiology of the bladder and appendix, and developed a method for injecting lymphatic vessels known in textbooks as the "Gerota method".

The renal fascia is sometimes called Gerota's fascia or Gerota's capsule after him. Also, the Albarran-Ormond syndrome (an inflammatory retroperitoneal fibrosis, named after urologists Joaquín Albarrán and John Kelso Ormond) is also known as Gerota’s syndrome or Gerota’s fasciitis.

He was a famed surgeon and the founder of a large Bucharest emergency-care hospital. The hospital, established on July 17, 1907, is now named the "Prof. Dr. Dimitrie Gerota Military Emergency Hospital". Many of the patients affected by the COVID-19 pandemic in Romania have been treated at this hospital.

Gerota also founded a museum of anatomical-surgical casts of his creation. A street in central Bucharest (formerly Jean Louis Calderon Street) and one in Craiova now bear his name.
