= Tolosa–Hunt syndrome =

- Other names: Painful ophthalmoplegia
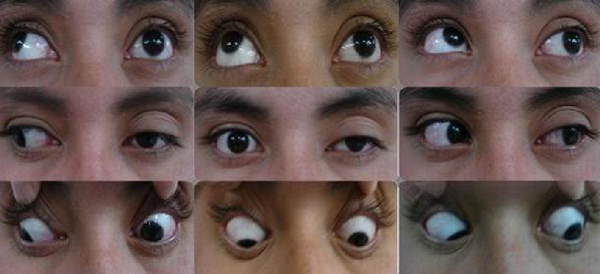
- Neuro-ophthalmologic examination showing ophthalmoplegia in a patient with Tolosa–Hunt syndrome, prior to treatment. The central image represents forward gaze, and each image around it represents gaze in that direction (for example, in the upper left image, the patient looks up and right; the left eye cannot accomplish this movement). The examination shows ptosis of the left eyelid, exotropia (outward deviation) of the primary gaze of the left eye, and paresis (weakness) of the left third, fourth and sixth cranial nerves.
- Specialty: Neurology

Tolosa–Hunt syndrome is a rare disorder characterized by severe and unilateral headaches with orbital pain, along with weakness and paralysis (ophthalmoplegia) of certain eye muscles (extraocular palsies).

In 2004, the International Headache Society defined the diagnostic criteria, which included granuloma.

== Signs and symptoms ==
Symptoms are usually limited to one side of the head. In most cases, the individual affected will experience intense, sharp pain and paralysis of muscles around the eye. Symptoms may subside without medical intervention, yet recur without a noticeable pattern. Patients with this disorder describe it as almost like being stabbed in the head. The pain also comes from behind the eyes, forehead, and around the temple area. Not only is the disorder painful, but it is also severe.

In addition, affected individuals may experience paralysis of various facial nerves and drooping of the upper eyelid (ptosis). Other signs include double vision, fever, chronic fatigue, vertigo or arthralgia. Occasionally, the patient may present with a feeling of protrusion of one or both eyeballs (exophthalmos). Patients may lose their sight, and experience nausea and vomiting.

Tolosa-Hunt Syndrome should not be mistaken for idiopathic inflammatory orbital pseudotumor (IIPO). Both disorders have similar symptoms and respond similarly to steroid medications.

These may go for up to 8 weeks. Treatment can reduce the symptoms, but the disorder may recur. In one clinical case in 2019, a 14-year-old boy was admitted to the hospital as he exhibited severe headaches, but MRI scans showed no brain abnormalities. Over 4 weeks, the symptoms worsened, and the patient showed paralysis in the mouth region. After being given medications to alleviate the symptoms, symptoms came back after 8 weeks and the patient had to be hospitalized.

These also can return unpredictably, sometimes with months or years.

== Causes ==
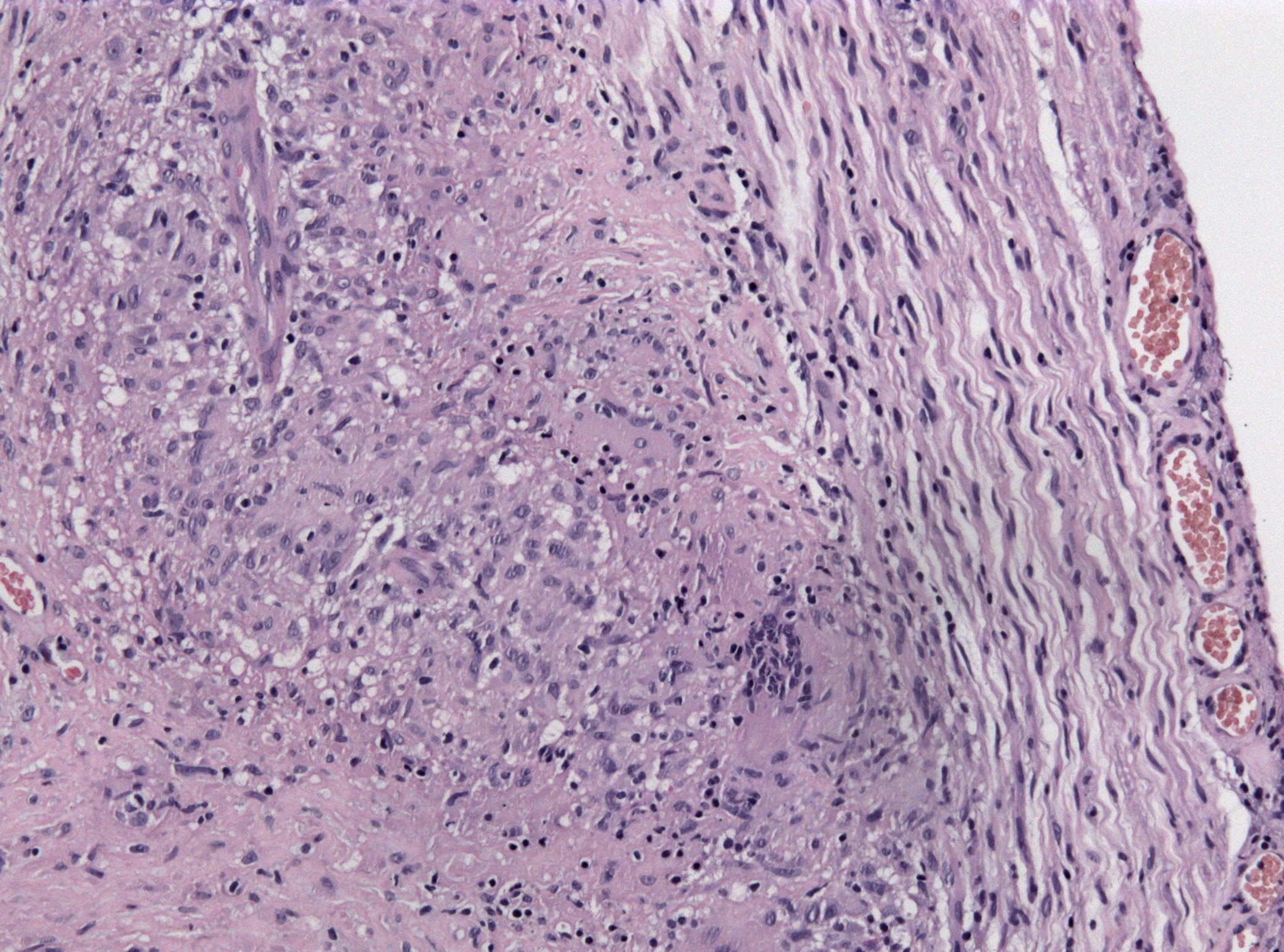
Granulomatous inflammations.

The cause of Tolosa–Hunt syndrome is not known. The disorder is thought to be, and often assumed to be, associated with inflammation of the areas behind the eyes (cavernous sinus and superior orbital fissure). These granulomatous inflammations involve lymphocytes, plasma cells, and multinucleate giant cells. Clinical cases have shown that the disorder consists of the inflammation of multiple cranial nerves, with the highest prevalence of ocular motor nerves. In some cases, it also involves the inflammation of sensory nerves, specifically the trigeminal nerves.

== Physiology ==
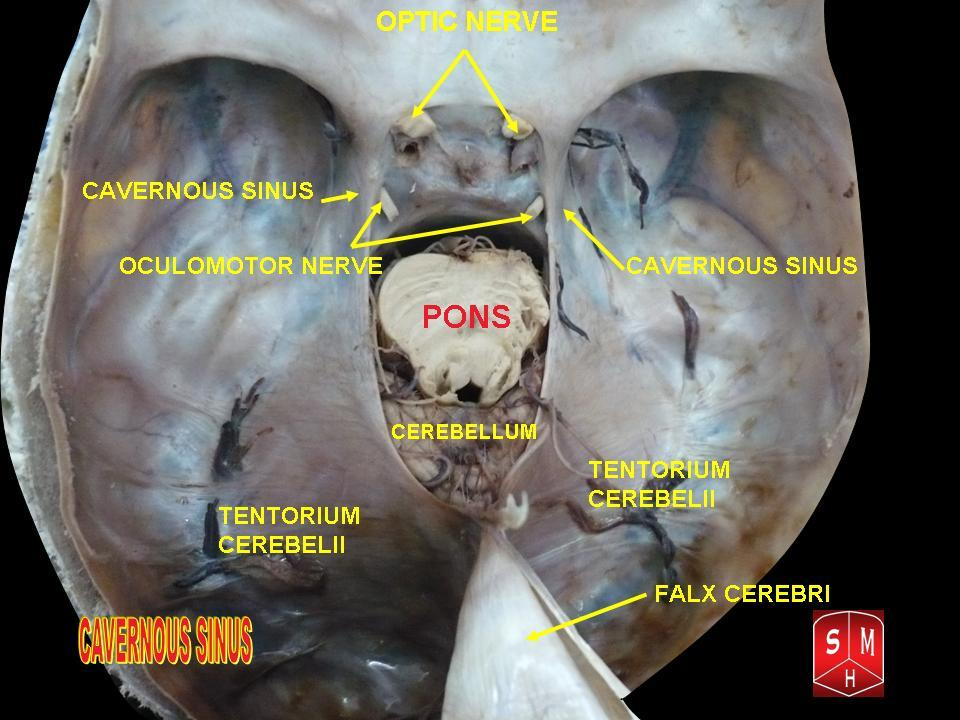
Location of cavernous sinus.

Tolosa-Hunt Syndrome is highly impacted by the inflammation of the cranial nerves, especially those that are located around the cavernous sinus. These include:

- Ocular Motor Nerves
1. Oculomotor Nerve (Cranial Nerve III) is important for eye coordination and movement. These include saccades, eye tracking, and eye fixations. This impacts 80% of patients.
2. Abducens Nerve (Cranial Nerve VI) helps move the eye laterally. Involvement of this nerve causes medial (towards the nose) deviation. Patients have been reported to have an impact on this nerve at least 70% of the time.
3. Trochlear Nerve (Cranial Nerve IV) helps move the eye downward and is impacted in patients 29% of the time.

In some cases, inflammation can also impact other cranial nerves. These include:

Location of oculomotor nerves.

- Sensory Nerves (trigeminal nerves)
1. Ophthalmic branch of the trigeminal nerve (V1). This nerve is important for the forehead, eye, and upper nose. Seems to be impacted 30% of the time.
2. Maxillary branch of the trigeminal nerve (V2), which is important for sensing cheeks, upper lip, and upper teeth, is occasionally impacted.
3. Mandibular branch of the trigeminal nerve (V3), which impacts sensation to the lower part of the face, such as the jaw, part of the teeth, and the ability to chew, is also occasionally affected.

A recent study involving a 14-year-old boy showed that the seventh cranial nerve has also been impacted, but not much is known about this one as compared to the other nerves.

== Diagnosis ==
Symptoms come from the International Classification of Headache Disorders which was done in 2013.

1. Headache on one side of the head.
2. Inflammation around the cavernous sinus - deep in the skull behind the eyes.
3. Inability to move one or both eyes due to weak cranial nerves (3rd, 4th, 6th cranial nerves) typically occurring within 2 weeks while the headaches are happening.
4. Headaches are on the same side around the brow and eye region.
5. Patient does not have another disease, such as a tumor.

Due to the nature of the disorder, biopsy has been recommended as the best tool to assess whether a patient has the disorder or not.

Tolosa–Hunt syndrome is also diagnosed via exclusion, and as such, a vast amount of laboratory tests are required to rule out other causes of the patient's symptoms. These tests include a complete blood count (erythrocyte sedimentation rate, C-reactive protein, glucose, hemoglobin A1c, electrolytes, liver function tests), thyroid function tests and serum protein electrophoresis. Studies of cerebrospinal fluid (cell count and differential, cultures such as bacterial, fungal, viral, glucose, oligoclonal bands, opening pressure and protein) and serologic testing (angiotensin-converting enzyme, antinuclear antibody, anti-dsDNA, antimitochondrial antibody, antineutrophil cytoplasmic antibody, borrelia burgdorferi serology, HIV). may also be beneficial in distinguishing between Tolosa–Hunt syndrome and conditions with similar signs and symptoms.

MRI scans of the brain and orbit with and without contrast, magnetic resonance angiography or digital subtraction angiography and a CT scan of the brain and orbit with and without contrast may all be useful in detecting inflammatory changes in the cavernous sinus, superior orbital fissure and/or orbital apex. Inflammatory change of the orbit on cross-sectional imaging in the absence of cranial nerve palsy is described by the more benign and general nomenclature of orbital pseudotumor. Sometimes a biopsy may need to be obtained to confirm the diagnosis, as it is useful in ruling out a neoplasm. Other diagnoses to consider include craniopharyngioma, migraine and meningioma.

=== Neuroimaging ===
MRI and CT scans are important for diagnosis, but should not be the sole form of diagnosis as they could potentially show other diseases (including tumors). These depend on the test coil, spatial, and temporal resolution of MRIs. The size of the lesion might not be detectable using MRIs if the lesions are not large enough. MRIs also have poorer temporal resolution, which makes it difficult to detect the timing of the lesions. In that case, it's recommended that patients do MRI follow-ups when the lesions develop over time. Additionally, other forms of diagnosis include vascular imaging such as digital subtraction angiography, CT angiography (CTA), and MRA.

There have been debates over the diagnosis. Yousem et al. 1990 showed that some patients with Tolosa-Hunt Syndrome have normal brain regions compared to some other patients in which they coined the term beginning Tolosa-Hunt Syndrome.

=== Differential diagnosis ===
Differential diagnoses is as follows:

Trauma	Vascular	Neoplasm	Inflammation & Infection	Miscellaneous
	Intracavernous carotid artery aneurysm; Posterior cerebral artery aneurysm; Carotid-cavernous fistula; Carotid-cavernous thrombosis; Posterior communicating artery aneurysm; Basilar artery aneurysm; Internal carotid artery dissection	Primary intracranial tumor: Pituitary adenoma; Meningioma; Craniopharyngioma, others; Primary cranial tumor: Chordoma, others; Local metastases: Nasopharyngeal tumour; Squamous cell carcinoma; Distant metastases: Lymphoma; Multiple myeloma; Carcinomatous metastases	Bacterial: Contiguous sinusitis; Mucocele (sphenoid sinus); Periostitis; Abscess; Viral: Herpes zoster; Fungal: Mucormycosis, Actinomycosis; Spirochetal: Treponema pallidum; Mycobacterial: Mycobacterium tuberculosis; Others: Sarcoidosis; Granulomatosis with polyangiitis; Eosinophilic granuloma; Orbital pseudotumor	Diabetic ophthalmoplegia; Ophthalmoplegic migraine; Giant cell arteritis

== Treatment ==
Prednisolone as therapy.

Treatment of Tolosa–Hunt syndrome includes immunosuppressives such as corticosteroids (often prednisolone) or steroid-sparing agents (such as methotrexate or azathioprine).

Radiotherapy has also been proposed as an addition. For patients to be given additional form of treatment, they need to perform follow up check ups.

Although there are known medications for patients, there is not much known about the instructions on administering the medications. Most medications given to patients with this disorder are based on other corticosteroids and other steroids, in which patients will be given a high dosage at first, and as it goes on, the dosage is decreased. Most patients will experience pain relief between 24–72 hours after the medications are given, but these times depend on the type of symptoms that the patient is experiencing. Recurrences are common despite the alleviation of the symptoms. Additionally, depending on the severity of the disorder, not everyone responds the same way. Some patients may respond well to medications, while some patients may not need them at all. Doctors advise on proper diagnosis and evaluation.

== Prognosis ==
Tolosa–Hunt syndrome typically has a good prognosis. Patients usually respond to corticosteroids, and spontaneous remission can occur, although movement of ocular muscles may remain damaged. Roughly 30–40% of patients who are treated for Tolosa–Hunt syndrome experience a relapse.

== Epidemiology ==
Tolosa-Hunt syndrome affects all age groups, but most cases have been in adults aged 40–50 years, with the average age being 41 years. There is no specific gender of the disorder, but most cases have shown a higher prevalence for males than females. Tolosa-Hunt Syndrome in the pediatric population is similar to that of adults. In addition, the cases have been found in multiple continents such as America, Europe, Asia, and Africa, thus, it is not known whether there are any differences between populations of different ethnic and racial makeup. Currently, there is about one case per million a year.

=== Pediatric cases ===
Some reports have shown that the disorder is more common in adults than children, but many other pediatric cases have been reported. Some indicate that diagnoses in children are more difficult than in adults due to children's difficulty in describing the disorder to doctors. This could be a problem when finding treatment for the disorder.

== History ==
Tolosa-Hunt Syndrome was first recognized in 1954, when Dr. Eduardo Tolosa wrote a case study that involved inflammation of the tissues surrounding the arteries. The diagnostic tools were based on observations, as imaging and other forms of diagnosis were unavailable at the time. The patient he worked with had pain in their eyes and eye muscles. These symptoms were very similar to those of an aneurysm, with additional neurological symptoms. He found that this patient had inflammation on their carotid siphon, which can be found in the cavernous sinus.

Later on in 1961, Dr. William E. Hunt and colleagues investigated several cases involving this disorder. Similar to the case that Dr. Eduardo Tolosa was working with, the cases they dealt with involved pain around the eyes. These symptoms would last for days or weeks. Patients would get attacks from months or years at a time, with other neurological deficits.

Dr. Smith and Dr. Taxdal coined the name "Tolosa-Hunt Syndrome" after Dr. Hunt and Dr. Tolosa, who examined the very first cases dealing with the disorder in 1966. In their "Painful Ophthalmoplegia - The Tolosa-Hunt Syndrome" paper, they described a total of 5 cases involving this neurological disorder. All cases involved similar symptoms to the original findings. They found out that when patients were given systemic corticosteroids, the symptoms would be reduced.
