= Chronic sclerosing sialadenitis =

Benign growth on the salivary gland

- Specialty: Dentistry

Chronic sclerosing sialadenitis is a chronic (long-lasting) inflammatory condition affecting the salivary gland. Relatively rare in occurrence, this condition is benign, but presents as hard, indurated and enlarged masses that are clinically indistinguishable from salivary gland neoplasms or tumors. It is now regarded as a manifestation of IgG4-related disease.

Involvement of the submandibular glands is also known as Küttner's tumor, named after Hermann Küttner (1870–1932), a German oral and maxillofacial surgeon, who reported four cases of submandibular gland lesions for the first time in 1896.

== Presentation ==
The inflammatory lesions in Küttner's tumor may occur on one side (unilateral) or both sides (bilateral), predominantly involving the submandibular gland, but is also known to occur in other major and minor salivary glands, including the parotid gland. Overall, salivary gland tumors are relatively rare, with approximately 2.5–3 cases per 100,000 people per year seen in the Western world; however, salivary gland malignancies account for 3–5% of all head and neck cancers. However, salivary tumors show a great deal of morphological diversity, as well as variations in the nature of the lesion (malignant vs. benign): approximately 20% to 25% of parotid tumors, 35% to 40% of submandibular tumors, and more than 90% of sublingual gland tumors are malignant. This situation underscores the diagnostic challenges in respect of Küttner's tumor; despite being benign, this condition mimics the clinical appearance of malignancy in the salivary gland.

The swollen masses of Küttner's tumor are generally painful, and patients are advised surgical resection (known as 'sialoadenectomy') of a part or whole of the glandular tissue upon suspicion of possible malignancy. It is only upon post-surgical histopathology of the excised mass that the diagnosis of Küttner's tumor is definitively made.

== Histological features ==
The histopathological features that characterize Küttner's tumor include:

- Heavy infiltration of the glandular tissue by lymphocytes (predominantly activated B-cells and helper T-cells) as well as plasma cells (collectively known as 'Lymphoplasmacytic Infiltrate').
- Presence of reactive lymphoid follicles in the infiltrate, marked by a lack of atypical lymphoid cells (this is in sharp contrast to the presentations in lymphoma).
- Atrophy and loss of acini (groups of secretory cells found in the salivary glands).
- Encasement of the glandular ducts in thick fibrous tissues, as a result of chronic presence of inflammatory infiltrate in that area - a condition known as periductal fibrosis.
- Eventual periductal and interlobular (inside the gland) sclerosis (replacement of regular tissue with hard connective tissue).

== Pathogenesis ==
The cause and pathogenesis of this chronic condition are not very well understood. Several factors have been postulated:

- Formation of a hard salivary calculus or sialolith by accumulation of calcium salts in the duct of the salivary gland (a process known as Sialolithiasis). This has been proposed as the most common cause for Küttner's tumor of the submandibular gland, with sialoliths observed in an appreciable proportion of cases. However, sialolith involvement may not be found in many cases.
- Abnormalities of the salivary gland ducts leading to excessive accumulation or retention of ductal secretions, which can excite chronic inflammations.
- Immune, especially autoimmune, cause - which has gained steam, given the observation that the tissue of the glands is overrun with lymphoid immune cells and fibrous connective tissue, as well as corroboration from markedly similar lesions (with histologic and immunohistochemical findings) seen elsewhere in the body. The presence of abundant Immunoglobulin G4 (IgG4) associated with Plasma cells infiltrating into the salivary glands, as well as increased serum IgG4 concentration, has been noted with patients with Küttner's tumor.

This chronic condition is primarily observed in adult (40–70 years) patients. However, Küttner's tumor, with prominent immunopathological features, has been described in an 11-year-old boy in Brazil in 2012.

== Diagnosis ==
Given the difficulties of a definitive pre-operative diagnosis, the clinical entity of Küttner's tumor has so far remained significantly under-reported and under-recognized. In recent times, armed with a better understanding of the occurrences and observable features of this condition, surgeons are increasingly depending upon pre-operative ultrasonography along with Fine-needle aspiration cytological (FNAC) examinations to make an accurate presumptive diagnosis, and according to one estimate, about 44% of patients undergoing submandibular resection are found to have this condition. In the ultrasonogram, Küttner's tumor is characterized by a diffuse, heterogeneous zone of echo-shadows. The FNAC finds cells greatly reduced in number (called 'paucicellularity') along with scattered tubular ducts against a backdrop of lymphoplasmacytic infiltration and fibrous depositions. There may be a reduced but moderate number of cells and ducts enveloped in fibrous sheaths, as well as fibrous proliferation of the gland's septa. The cytologic findings by themselves may not be specific, and the diagnosis requires adjunct consideration of both the ultrasonogram and clinical presentation. Application of magnetic resonance imaging (MRI) has been tried to non-invasively examine the morphological variations in Küttner's tumor and differentiate them from those seen in malignant tumors; while MRI findings of the affected tissue and the pattern of cellular infiltration may offer some diagnostic clues for this condition, so far the results have been inconclusive.

== Existing treatment ==
Standard, and most effective, therapy to date is glandular sialoadenectomy, which is associated with fairly low operative morbidity; however, in recent times, the administration of steroid (which can shrink the inflammatory lesion and is known to reduce serum IgG4 values) has been considered favorably, and may be useful in younger patients or those who refuse surgery.

== See also ==
- Sialadenitis
