= Inflammatory aortic aneurysm =

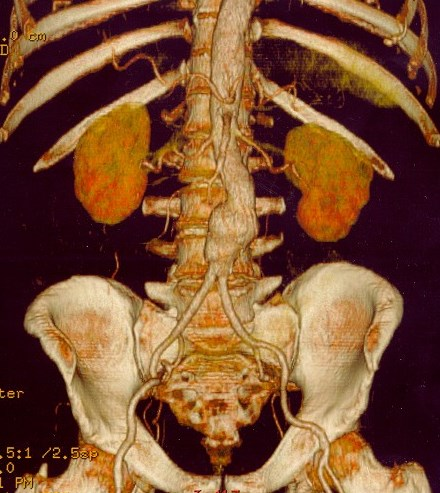
- CT reconstruction image of an abdominal aortic aneurysm
- Specialty: Vascular surgery

Inflammatory aortic aneurysm (IAA), also known as Inflammatory abdominal aortic aneurysm (IAAA), is a type of abdominal aortic aneurysm (AAA) where the walls of the aneurysm become thick and inflamed. Similar to AAA, IAA occurs in the abdominal region. IAA is closely associated and believed to be a response to and extensive peri-aneurysmal fibrosis, which is the formation of excess fibrous connective tissue in an organ or tissue in a reparative or reactive process IAA accounts for 5-10% of aortic aneurysms. IAA occurs mainly in a population that is on average younger by 10 years than most AAA patients. Some common symptoms of IAA may include back pain, abdominal tenderness, fevers, weight loss or elevated Erythrocyte sedimentation rate (ESR) levels. Corticosteroids and other immunosuppressive drugs have been found to decrease symptoms and the degree of peri-aortic inflammation and fibrosis

== Signs and symptoms ==
Inflammatory Aortic Aneurysms occur typically in a younger population compared to the typical Abdominal Aortic Aneurysm group. Risk of rupture for the IAA group, due to thinning of aneurysm walls, are also rare due to inflammation and fibrosis

Unruptured inflammatory AAAs are usually symptomatic:

- abdominal or back pain (70 to 80%)
- abdominal tenderness
- fever
- weight loss
- elevated erythrocyte sedimentation rate (90%)

== Causes ==
Although the exact cause is unknown, some risk factors associated with individuals with IAA are:

Tobacco Use: Cigarette smoking and other forms of tobacco use appear to increase the risk of aortic aneurysms. In addition to the damaging effects that smoking causes directly to the arteries, smoking contributes to the buildup of fatty plaques in the arteries (atherosclerosis) and high blood pressure. Smoking may also cause an aneurysm to grow faster by further damaging the aorta.

Hardening of the arteries (atherosclerosis). Atherosclerosis occurs when fat and other substances build up on the lining of a blood vessel, increasing the risk of an aneurysm.

Infection in the aorta (vasculitis). In rare cases, abdominal aortic aneurysm may be caused by an infection or inflammation that weakens a section of the aortic wall.

== Mechanism ==
In general, an aneurysm is bulge that can occur in blood vessels or sometimes in the heart itself. In the case of IAA, this type of aneurysm is localized in the aortic artery, which is the artery that carries oxygenated blood from the heart to the rest of the body. This location is ideal for aneurysms to develop based upon the high stress and pressure from blood circulation. Fibrosis, a stiffening of the muscle, may occur due to the exposure to stress and blood pressure. In the development of the fibrosis an autoimmune response may occur which in the area causing the "inflammation." This inflammation is what gives IAA the characteristic thickened walls of the aneurysm.

All types of abdominal aortic aneurysms occur in the part of the aorta that passes through the middle to low abdomen. Thoracic aortic aneurysms occur on the aorta as it passes through the chest cavity. These are less common than abdominal aneurysms. Small aneurysms generally pose no threat. However, aneurysms increase the risk for:

- Atherosclerotic plaques to form at the site of the aneurysm, which causes further weakening of the artery wall.
- blood clots may form at the site and dislodge, increasing the chance of stroke
- Increase in the size of the aneurysm, causing it to press on other organs, which may cause pain.
- Aneurysm may also rupture. It is fragile and may burst under stress. The rupture of an aortic aneurysm is a catastrophic, life-threatening event.

== Diagnosis ==
Aortic aneurysms are often encountered during an X-ray, ultrasound, or echocardiogram done for other reasons. IAA may also be found during a routine physical exam by feeling for bulges in the abdominal area. If an aortic aneurysm is suspected, medical history will be considered along with a physical examination. Further tests to locate the aneurysm may be required.

When an aneurysm is suspected or diagnosed, it is important to:

- Pinpoint the location of the aneurysm.
- Estimate its size.
- Find out how fast it is growing.
- Find out whether other blood vessels are involved.
- See if there are blood clots or inflammation.

Tests to help find out the location, size, and rate of growth of an aneurysm include:

- Abdominal ultrasound - This imaging allows the doctor to observe growth of the aneurysm. If the aneurysm is large, a monitoring ultrasound may need to occur every 6 to 12 months. If the aneurysm is small, monitoring may occur every 2 to 3 years.
- Computed tomography (CT) and magnetic resonance angiogram (MRA) - These imaging techniques give a more detailed view of the aneurysm. These techniques may be used to gather information about aneurysm's relation to the blood vessels of the kidney or other organs. This information may be useful before surgery. CT is used to watch the growth of a thoracic aortic aneurysm.
- Echocardiogram - This ultrasound exam is used to study the heart. A transthoracic echocardiogram (TTE) or a transesophageal echocardiogram (TEE) may also be done to further diagnose thoracic aortic aneurysm.
- Angiogram - An angiogram can help identify the size of the aneurysm and reveal if there are any aortic dissections, blood clots, or other blood vessel involvement.

== Treatment ==
Corticosteroids and other immunosuppressive drugs have been found to decrease symptoms and the degree of peri-aortic inflammation and fibrosis.

== Research ==
2002 the CT scan was assessed for it reliability for imaging inflammatory aortic aneurysms and to quantitatively evaluate its features. The finding were that CT scan was a reliable means to diagnose IAA.

2008 a study was done to test the effectiveness of MRI and FDG-PET tests to detect, diagnose, and measure inflammatory aortic arch syndrome. The results from the study were that MRI and FDG-PET were unreliable techniques due to giant-cell arteritis.

2015 following endovascular repair of an aortic aneurysm the type of the endograft's material used for repair seems to play a role in the inflammatory response associated with IAA.
