= Retroperitoneal fibrosis =

Overgrowth of fibrous tissue in the lower back abdominal cavity (retroperitoneum)

- Other names: Ormond's disease
- Specialty: Rheumatology, vascular surgery, urology
- Risk factors: male sex, age
- Frequency: 0.005%

Retroperitoneal fibrosis or Ormond's disease is a disease featuring the proliferation of fibrous tissue (fibrosis) in the retroperitoneum, the compartment of the body containing the kidneys, aorta, renal tract, and various other structures. It may present with lower back pain, kidney failure, hypertension, deep vein thrombosis, and other obstructive symptoms. It is named after John Kelso Ormond, who discovered the condition in 1948.

== Causes ==
The association of idiopathic retroperitoneal fibrosis with various immune-related conditions and response to immunosuppression led to a search for an autoimmune cause of idiopathic RPF. Many of these previously idiopathic cases can now be attributed to IgG4-related disease, an autoimmune disorder proposed in 2003. Otherwise, one-third of cases are secondary to malignancy, medication (methysergide, hydralazine, beta blockers), prior radiotherapy, or certain infections. However, emerging evidence suggests that occupational exposure to asbestos and tobacco smoking are also strong, synergistic risk factors for the development of idiopathic RPF, underscoring the importance of preventative measures in high risk populations.

Other associations include:

- connective tissue disease
- Riedel's thyroiditis
- sclerosing cholangitis
- membranous nephropathy
- ankylosing spondylitis
- inflammatory bowel disease
- ANCA-associated vasculitis
- autoimmune pancreatitis
- sarcoidosis
- primary biliary cirrhosis
- inflammatory abdominal aortic aneurysm

== Diagnosis ==
The diagnosis of retroperitoneal fibrosis cannot be made on the basis of the results of laboratory studies. CT is the best diagnostic modality: a confluent mass surrounding the aorta and common iliac arteries can be seen. On MRI, it has low T1 signal intensity and variable T2 signal. Malignant retroperitoneal fibrosis usually gives uneven MRI signals, is bulky, extends above the origins of renal arteries, or displaces the aorta anteriorly. Additionally, malignant retroperitoneal fibrosis less frequently displaces the ureters medially when compared to other causes of retroperitoneal fibrosis.

On fludeoxyglucose (18F) (FDG) positron emission tomography (PET) scan, FDG accumulation is shown in the affected area.

Although biopsy is not usually recommended, it is appropriate when malignancy or infection is suspected. Biopsy should also be done if the location of fibrosis is atypical or if there is an inadequate response to initial treatment.

== Treatment ==
In the absence of severe urinary tract obstruction (which generally requires surgery with omental wrapping), treatment is generally with glucocorticoids initially, followed by DMARDs either as steroid-sparing agents or if refractory on steroids. Glucocorticoids act as anti-inflammatory agents, diminishing the size of the retroperitoneal mass and alleviating obstructions and associated complications; this is achieved through the suppression of cytokine synthesis that contributes to the acute-phase reaction, and by impeding the development of collagen. The selective estrogen receptor modulator tamoxifen has shown to improve the condition in various small trials, although the exact mechanism of its action remains unclear.
