= IgG4-related ophthalmic disease =

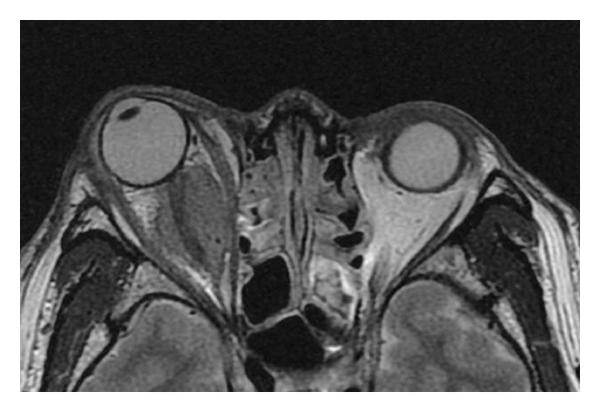
- Mass lesion around the right optic disc in a 44-year-old man with IgG4-related ophthalmic disease and a serum IgG4 of 599 mg/dL. (T2-weighted MRI)
- Specialty: Ophthalmology

IgG4-related ophthalmic disease (IgG4-ROD) is the recommended term to describe orbital (eye socket) manifestations of the systemic condition IgG4-related disease, which is characterised by infiltration of lymphocytes and plasma cells and subsequent fibrosis in involved structures. It can involve one or more of the orbital structures.

Frequently involved structures include the lacrimal glands, extraocular muscles, infraorbital nerve, supraorbital nerve and eyelids. It has also been speculated that ligneous conjunctivitis may be a manifestation of IgG4-related disease (IgG4-RD).

As is the case with other manifestations of IgG4-related disease, a prompt response to steroid therapy is a characteristic feature of IgG4-ROD in most cases, unless significant fibrosis has already occurred.

It basically can cause loss of vision and in other cases, cause skin irritation and loss of brain function

== Symptoms and signs ==
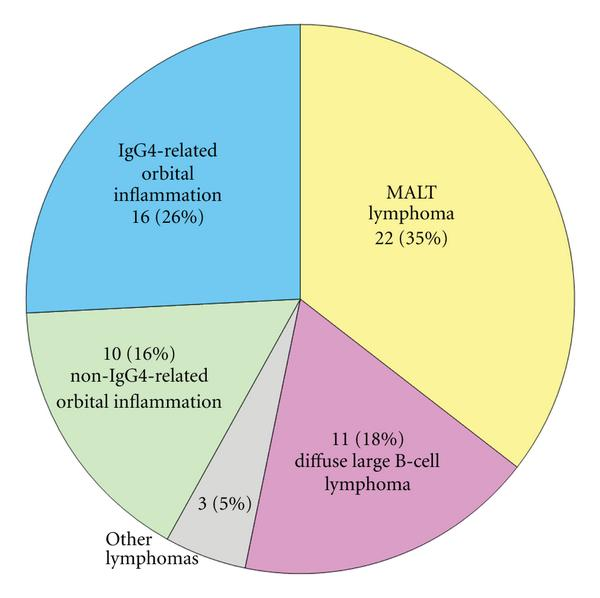
Breakdown of diagnosis in orbital lymphoproliferative disorders in a Japanese study

Symptoms, if any, can be mild even in the presence of significant swelling or masses.

Lacrimal gland involvement may cause swelling of the upper eyelid, or proptosis if there is severe swelling. Other orbital masses or inflammation can result in visual disturbance (blurred vision, double vision, visual field impairment), restricted eye movements, pain or discomfort, numbness in the distribution of the supraorbital and/or infraorbital nerves, or proptosis.

IgG4-related ophthalmic disease has been estimated to account for approximately 25% of all cases of proptosis, eyelid swelling and other features of orbital swelling.

== Diagnosis ==
The extent of inflammation that can occur in IgG4-ROD is well demonstrated on magnetic resonance imaging (MRI).

Infraorbital nerve enlargement (IONE) is considered to be a particularly suspicious sign of IgG4-ROD, but seems to occur only when inflammation is in direct contact with the infraorbital canal. IONE is defined as the infraorbital nerve diameter being greater than the optic nerve diameter in the coronal plane.

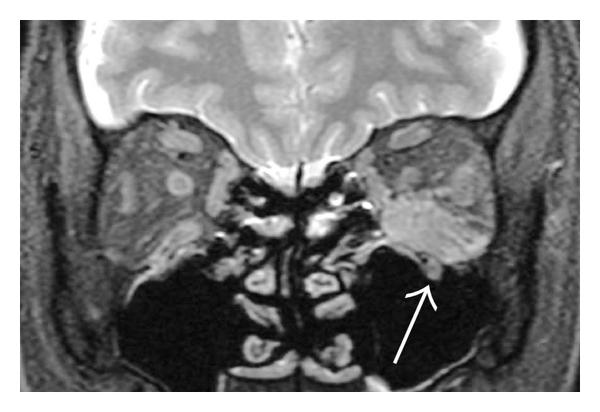
Enlargements in the left inferior rectus muscle and infraorbital nerve (arrow) in a 65-year-old man with a serum IgG4 of 404 mg/dL. (T2-weighted MRI)

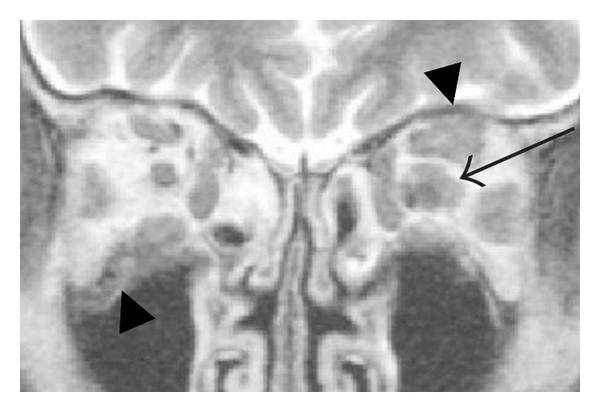
Swelling of the left superior and lateral rectus muscles, a mass lesion around the left optic disc (arrow), and enlargements of the left supraorbital nerve and the right infraorbital nerve (arrow heads) in a 60-year-old man with a serum IgG4 of 463 mg/dL. (T1-weighted MRI)

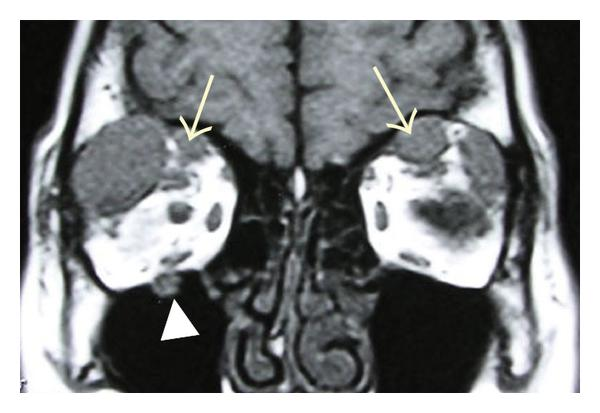
Bilateral supraorbital nerve enlargements (arrows) and right infraorbital nerve (arrow head) enlargement in a 47-year-old woman with a serum IgG4 of 1000 mg/dL. (T1-weighted MRI)

== Nomenclature ==
Although IgG4-related ophthalmic disease is the recommended name for all orbital manifestations of IgG4-related disease, more precise terminology for the various anatomical variations of the condition can be used. This includes:

- IgG4-related dacryoadenitis (lacrimal glands)
- IgG4-related dacryocystitis (lacrimal sac)
- IgG4-related orbital myositis (extraocular muscles)
- IgG4-related orbital nerve lesions
- IgG4-related optic neuropathy (optic nerve)
- IgG4-related orbital inflammation (orbital soft tissue)
- IgG4-related pan-orbital inflammation (all of the various types of orbital structures)

Names previously used in the diagnosis of cases now considered to be IgG4-ROD have included idiopathic orbital inflammatory disease and orbital pseudotumor.

== See also ==
- Idiopathic orbital inflammatory disease
