= Thioacetamide =

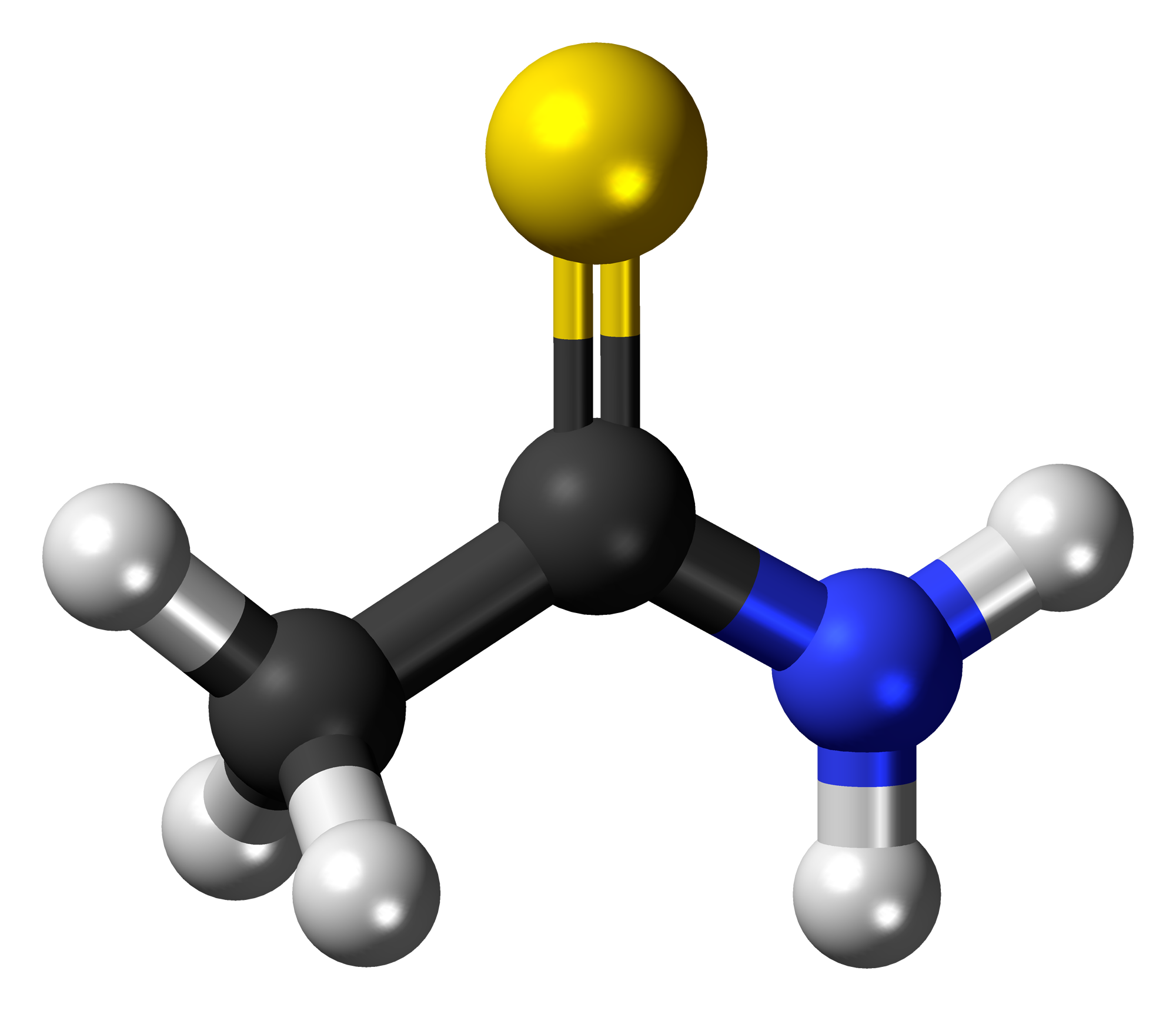

Names
- IUPAC name Thioacetamide
- Preferred IUPAC name Ethanethioamide
- Other names acetothioamide, TAA, thioacetimidic acid, TA, TAM

Identifiers
CAS Number	62-55-5
3D model (JSmol)	Interactive image
Beilstein Reference	506006
ChEBI	CHEBI:32497
ChEMBL	ChEMBL38737
ChemSpider	2006126
ECHA InfoCard	100.000.493
EC Number	200-541-4
KEGG	C19302
PubChem CID	2723949
RTECS number	AC8925000
UNII	075T165X8M
UN number	3077
CompTox Dashboard (EPA)	DTXSID9021340
- InChI: InChI=1S/C2H5NS/c1-2(3)4/h1H3,(H2,3,4) Key: YUKQRDCYNOVPGJ-UHFFFAOYSA-N; InChI=1/C2H5NS/c1-2(3)4/h1H3,(H2,3,4) Key: YUKQRDCYNOVPGJ-UHFFFAOYAD
- SMILES: S=C(N)C

Properties
Chemical formula	C_{2}H_{5}NS
Molar mass	75.13 g/mol
Appearance	colourless crystals
Odor	slight mercaptan
Density	1.319 g/cm^{3}
Melting point	115 °C (239 °F; 388 K)
Boiling point	decomposes
Solubility in water	good
Magnetic susceptibility (χ)	−42.45·10^{−6} cm^{3}/mol

Structure
Crystal structure	monoclinic

Hazards
- Occupational safety and health (OHS/OSH)
Main hazards	Foul stench, carcinogenic
- GHS labelling
Pictograms	(GHS07: Exclamation mark) (GHS08: Health hazard)
Signal word	Danger
Hazard statements	H302, H315, H319, H350, H412
Precautionary statements	P201, P202, P264, P270, P273, P280, P281, P301+P312, P302+P352, P305+P351+P338, P308+P313, P321, P330, P332+P313, P337+P313, P362, P405, P501
Safety data sheet (SDS)	MSDS

Related compounds
Related compounds	acetamide, dithioacetic acid
- Except where otherwise noted, data are given for materials in their standard state (at 25 °C [77 °F], 100 kPa). verify (what is ?) Infobox references

Thioacetamide is an organosulfur compound with the formula C_{2}H_{5}NS. This white crystalline solid is soluble in water and serves as a source of sulfide ions in the synthesis of organic and inorganic compounds. It is a prototypical thioamide.

== Research ==
Thioacetamide is known to induce acute or chronic liver disease (fibrosis and cirrhosis) in the experimental animal model. Its administration in rat induces hepatic encephalopathy, metabolic acidosis, increased levels of transaminases, abnormal coagulation, and centrilobular necrosis, which are the main features of the clinical chronic liver disease so thioacetamide can precisely replicate the initiation and progression of human liver disease in an experimental animal model.

== Coordination chemistry ==
Thioacetamide is widely used in classical qualitative inorganic analysis as an in situ source for sulfide ions. Thus, treatment of aqueous solutions of many metal cations to a solution of thioacetamide affords the corresponding metal sulfide:

M^{2+} + CH_{3}C(S)NH_{2} + H_{2}O → MS + CH_{3}C(O)NH_{2} + 2 H^{+} (M = Ni, Pb, Cd, Hg)

Related precipitations occur for sources of soft trivalent cations (As^{3+}, Sb^{3+}, Bi^{3+}) and monovalent cations (Ag^{+}, Cu^{+}).

== Preparation ==
Thioacetamide is prepared by treating acetamide with phosphorus pentasulfide as shown in the following idealized reaction:

CH_{3}C(O)NH_{2} + 1/4 P_{4}S_{10} → CH_{3}C(S)NH_{2} + 1/4 P_{4}S_{6}O_{4}

== Structure ==
The C_{2}NH_{2}S portion of the molecule is planar; the C-S, C-N, and C-C distances are 1.68, 1.31, and 1.50 Å, respectively. The short C-S and C-N distances indicate multiple bonding.

== Safety ==
Thioacetamide is a potential human carcinogen, class 2B.

It is known to produce marked hepatotoxicity in exposed animals. Toxicity values are 301 mg/kg in rats (LD50, oral administration), 300 mg/kg in mice (LD50, intraperitoneal administration). This is evidenced by enzymatic changes, which include elevation in the levels of serum alanine transaminase, aspartate transaminase and aspartic acid.
