= Idiopathic orbital inflammatory disease =

- Other names: Orbital pseudotumor
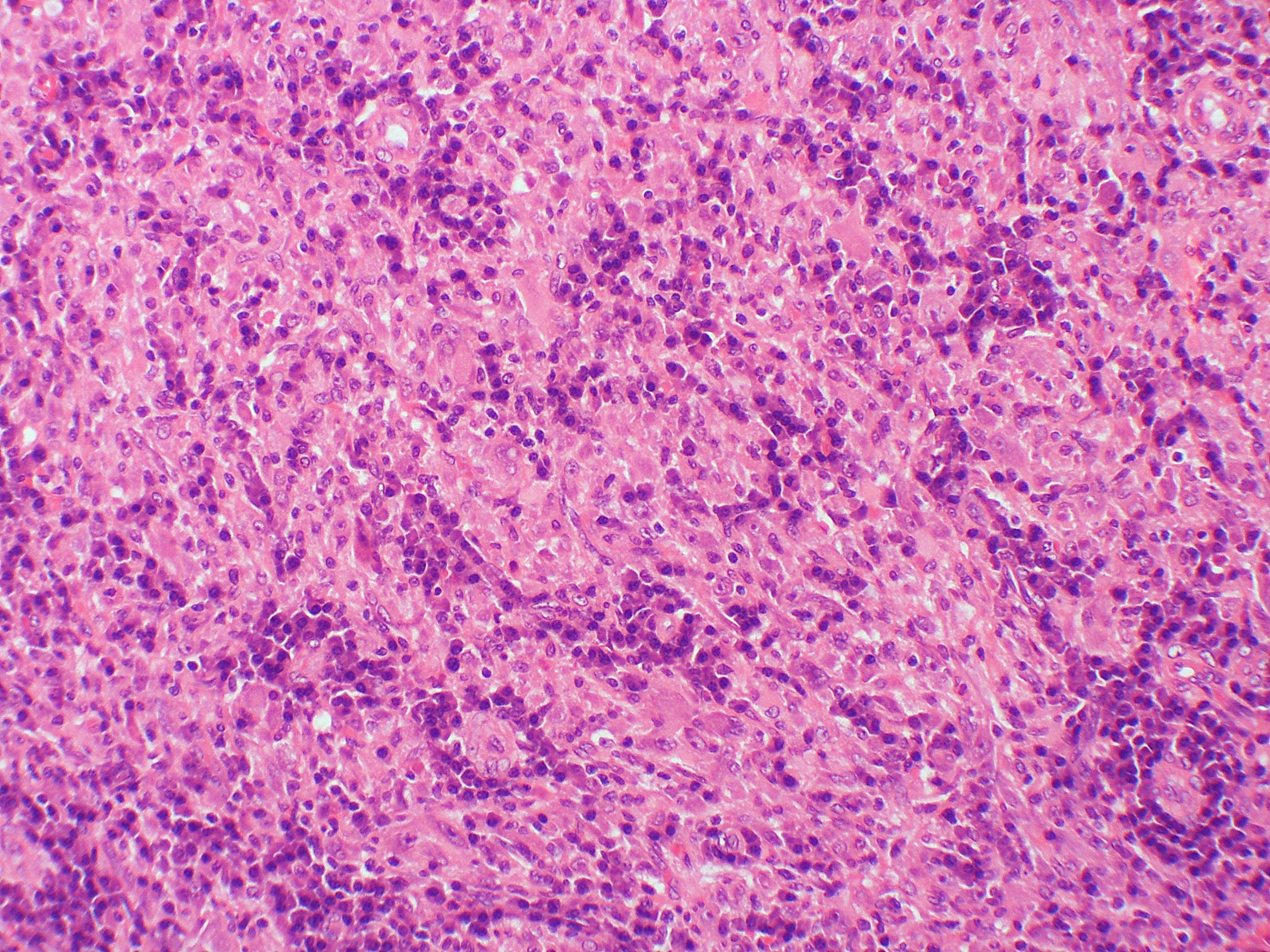
- In this area there is a predominance of large histiocytes admixed with plasma cells.
- Specialty: Ophthalmology

Idiopathic orbital inflammatory (IOI) disease refers to a marginated mass-like enhancing soft tissue involving any area of the orbit. It is the most common painful orbital mass in the adult population, and is associated with proptosis, cranial nerve palsy (Tolosa–Hunt syndrome), uveitis, and retinal detachment. Idiopathic orbital inflammatory syndrome, also known as orbital pseudotumor, was first described by Gleason in 1903 and by Busse and Hochheim. It was then characterized as a distinct entity in 1905 by Birch-Hirschfeld. It is a benign, nongranulomatous orbital inflammatory process characterized by extraocular orbital and adnexal inflammation with no known local or systemic cause. Its diagnosis is of exclusion once neoplasm, primary infection and systemic disorders have been ruled out. Once diagnosed, it is characterized by its chronicity, anatomic location or histologic subtype.

Idiopathic orbital inflammation has a varied clinical presentation depending on the involved tissue. It can range from a diffuse inflammatory process to a more localized inflammation of muscle, lacrimal gland or orbital fat. Its former name, orbital pseudotumor, is derived due to resemblance to a neoplasm. However, histologically it is characterized by inflammation. Although a benign condition, it may present with an aggressive clinical course with severe vision loss and oculomotor dysfunction.

== Signs and symptoms ==
Affected individuals typically present with sudden painful proptosis, redness, and edema. Proptosis will vary according to the degree of inflammation, fibrosis, and mass effect. Occasionally, ptosis, chemosis, motility dysfunction (ophthalmoplegia), and optic neuropathy are seen. In the setting of extensive sclerosis there may be restriction, compression, and destruction of orbital tissue. Symptoms usually develop acutely (hours to days), but have also been seen to develop over several weeks or even months. Malaise, headaches, and nausea may accompany these symptoms. Other unusual presentations described include cystoid macular edema, temporal arteritis, and cluster headaches.

Pediatric IOI accounts for about 17% of cases idiopathic orbital inflammation. The most common sign is proptosis, but redness and pain are also experienced. Presentation varies slightly compared to adults with bilateral involvement, uveitis, disc edema and tissue eosinophilia being more common in this population. The presence of uveitis generally implies a poor outcome for pediatric IOI. Bilateral presentation may have a higher incidence of systemic disease.

== Pathogenesis ==
The exact cause of IOI is unknown, but infectious and immune-mediated mechanisms have been proposed. Several studies have described cases where onset of orbital pseudotumor was seen simultaneously or several weeks after upper respiratory infections. Another study by Wirostko et al. proposes that organisms resembling Mollicutes cause orbital inflammation by destroying the cytoplasmic organelles of parasitized cells.

Orbital pseudotumor has also been observed in association with Crohn's disease, systemic lupus erythematosus, rheumatoid arthritis, diabetes mellitus, myasthenia gravis, and ankylosing spondylitis all of which strengthen the basis of IOI being an immune-mediated disease. Response to corticosteroid treatment and immunosuppressive agents also support this idea.

Trauma has also been seen to precede some cases of orbital pseudotumor. However, one study by Mottow-Lippe, Jakobiec, and Smith suggests that the release of circulating antigens caused by local vascular permeability triggers an inflammatory cascade in the affected tissues.

Although these mechanisms have been postulated as possible causes of IOI, their exact nature and relationships to the condition still remain unclear.

=== Histopathology ===
The histopathology of idiopathic orbital inflammation is described as nondiagnostic and diverse. It includes diverse polymorphous infiltrate, atypical granulomatous inflammation, tissue eosinophilia, and infiltrative sclerosis Although several classification schemes have been postulated, none have been definitively accepted due to the absence of distinct differences among the histopathological types as to the signs, symptoms, clinical course, and outcome.

== Diagnosis ==
A differential diagnosis includes lymphoproliferative lesions, thyroid ophthalmopathy, IgG4-related ophthalmic disease, sarcoidosis, granulomatosis with polyangiitis, orbital cellulitis and carotid-cavernous fistula.

=== Imaging ===
The best imaging modality for idiopathic orbital inflammatory disease is contrast-enhanced thin section magnetic resonance with fat suppression. The best diagnostic clue is a poorly marginated, mass-like enhancing soft tissue involving any area of the orbit. Overall, radiographic features for idiopathic orbital inflammatory syndrome vary widely. They include inflammation of the extraocular muscles (myositis) with tendinous involvement, orbital fat stranding, lacrimal gland inflammation and enlargement (dacryoadenitis), involvement of the optic sheath complex, uvea, and sclera, a focal intraorbital mass or even diffuse orbital involvement. Bone destruction and intracranial extension is rare, but has been reported. Depending on the area of involvement, IOI may be categorized as:

- Myositic
- Lacrimal
- Anterior – Involvement of the globe, retrobulbar orbit
- Diffuse – Multifocal intraconal involvement with or without an extraconal component
- Apical – Involving the orbital apex and with intracranial involvement

Tolosa–Hunt syndrome is a variant of orbital pseudotumor in which there is extension into the cavernous sinus through the superior orbital fissure. Another disease variant is Sclerosing pseudotumor, which more often presents bilaterally and may extend into the sinuses.

CT findings

In non-enhanced CT one may observe a lacrimal, extra-ocular muscle, or other orbital mass. It may be focal or infiltrative and will have poorly circumscribed soft tissue. In contrast-enhanced CT there is moderate diffuse irregularity and enhancement of the involved structures. A dynamic CT will show an attenuation increase in the late phase, contrary to lymphoma where there is an attenuation decrease. Bone CT will rarely show bone remodeling or erosion, as mentioned above.

MR findings

On MR examination there is hypointensity in T1 weighted imaging (WI), particularly in sclerosing disease. T1WI with contrast will show moderate to marked diffuse irregularity and enhancement of involved structures. T2 weighted imaging with fat suppression will show iso- or slight hyperintensity compared to muscle. There is also decreased signal intensity compared to most orbital lesions due to cellular infiltrate and fibrosis. In chronic disease or sclerosing variant, T2WI with FS will show hypointensity (due to fibrosis). Findings on STIR (Short T1 Inversion Recovery) are similar to those on T2WI FS. In Tolosa–Hunt syndrome, findings include enhancement and fullness of the anterior cavernous sinus and superior orbital fissure in T1WI with contrast, while MRA may show narrowing of cavernous sinus internal carotid artery (ICA).

Ultrasonographic findings

On grayscale ultrasound there is reduced reflectivity, regular internal echoes, and weak attenuation, in a way, similar to lymphoproliferative lesions.

== Treatment ==
Corticosteroids remain the main treatment modality for IOI. There is usually a dramatic response to this treatment and is often viewed as pathognomonic for this disease. Although response is usually quick, many agree that corticosteroids should be continued on a tapering basis to avoid breakthrough inflammation. Although many respond to corticosteroid treatment alone, there are several cases in which adjuvant therapy is needed. While many alternatives are available, there is no particular well-established protocol to guide adjuvant therapy. Among the available options there is: surgery, alternative corticosteroid delivery, radiation therapy, non-steroidal anti-inflammatory drugs, cytotoxic agents (chlorambucil, cyclophosphamide), corticosteroid sparing immunosuppressants (methotrexate, cyclosporine, azathioprine), IV immune-globin, plasmapheresis, and biologic treatments (such as TNF-α inhibitors).

== Epidemiology ==
IOI or orbital pseudotumor is the second most common cause of exophthalmos following Grave's orbitopathy and the third most common orbital disorder following thyroid orbitopathy and lymphoproliferative disease accounting for 5–17.6% of orbital disorders, There is no age, sex, or race predilection, but it is most frequently seen in middle-aged individuals. Pediatric cases account for about 17% of all cases of IOI.

== See also ==
- Graves' ophthalmopathy
- IgG4-related ophthalmic disease
