= Infiltration (medical) =

Process of cells or substances entering places they are not normally present

Infiltration in a medical context is the process of cells or substances moving across a barrier, typically a tissue barrier, into a place they are not normally found, or in which they are typically found in lower concentrations. Infiltration may refer to normal physiological processes, such as the infiltration of certain immune cells into peripheral tissues. Infiltration may also refer to infiltrative disorders, pathological processes such as malignant tumor cells infiltrating new areas of the human body, or small particles infiltrating tissues, where they may cause damage or inflammation.

== Types of Infiltration ==
The term 'infiltration' is frequently used to describe various pathologic and physiologic processes, including but not limited to:

=== Immune Infiltration ===
This occurs when immune cells like lymphocytes and macrophages migrate into tissues in response to infection, injury, or inflammation, aiding in defense and healing but potentially contributing to autoimmune diseases if misdirected. Immune cells (especially lymphocytes) also infiltrate into malignant tumors and other neoplasms.

=== Malignant Infiltration ===
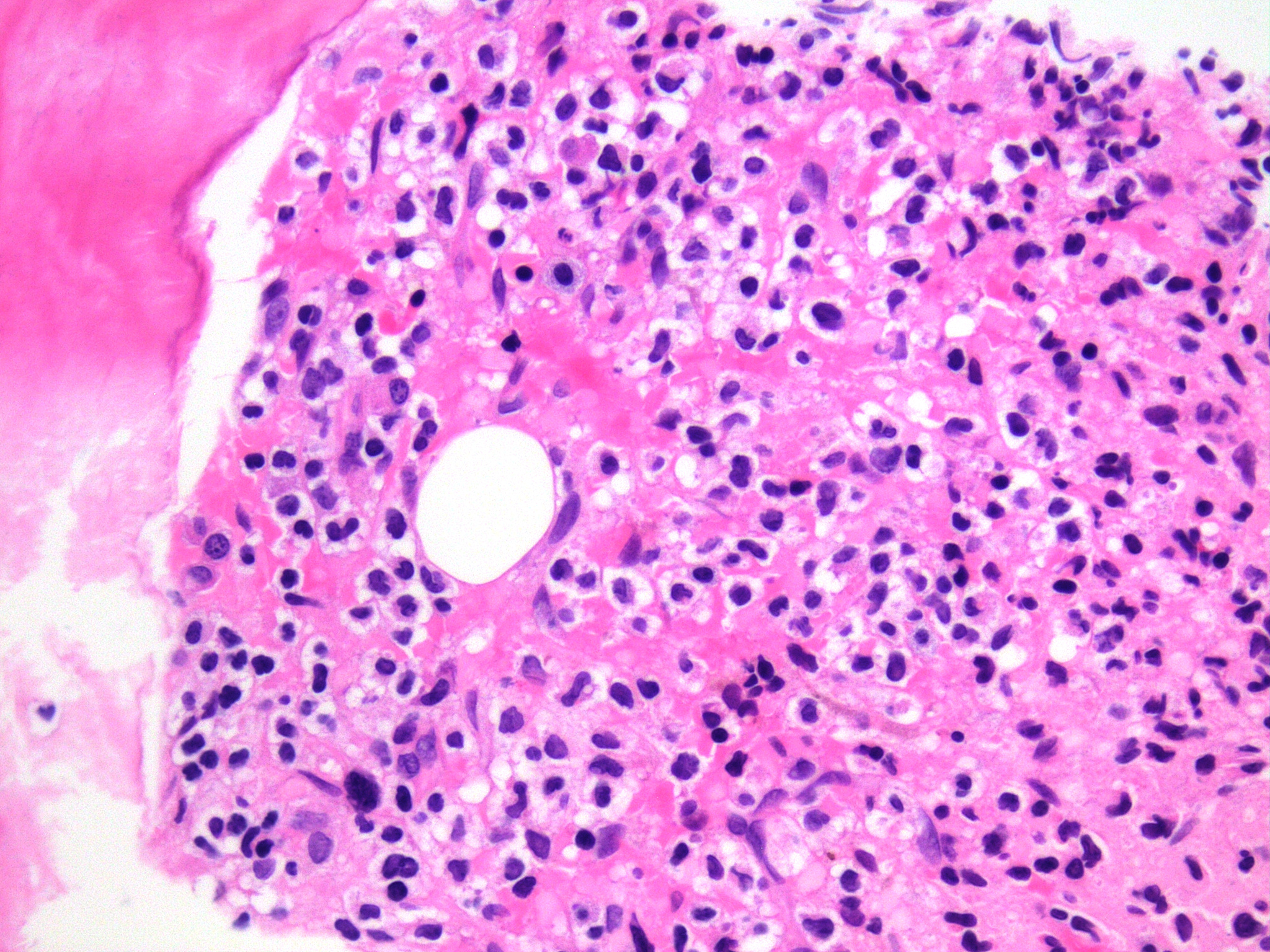
Hairy cell leukemia infiltrating bone marrow, an example of malignant infiltration

Malignant infiltration involves cancerous cells invading surrounding healthy tissues by breaching normal cellular boundaries, which allows tumors to grow locally and facilitates metastasis to distant organs. This is especially relevant for cancers that cross the blood-brain barrier and cause secondary brain tumors.

=== Pulmonary Infiltration ===
This term refers to the accumulation of substances such as fluids, immune cells, bacteria, proteins, foreign particulate matter, and other things within the lung tissue, often detected as non-distinct infiltrates on imaging studies. Tissue biopsy and other tests are frequently used to determine the nature of pulmonary infiltrates, as there are many possible causes.

=== Immune Complex Infiltration ===
Antibody-antigen immune complexes can sometimes precipitate out of serum and infiltrate tissues surrounding capillaries and other small blood vessels. Pathologically, this is often relevant in lung disease and kidney disease. These typically interact with local complement proteins or induce other immune system responses, resulting in a Type III hypersensitivity reaction.

=== Fatty Infiltration ===
Also known as steatosis, where excessive fat accumulates within cells of organs like the liver or muscle fibers. It is often linked to hyperlipidemia, among other risk factors.

=== Anesthetic Infiltration ===
A medical technique involving the injection of local anesthetics into tissues to provide numbness for minor surgical procedures or pain relief.
