= John Kelso Ormond =

American urologist (1886–1978)

John Kelso Ormond was an American urologist who discovered retroperitoneal fibrosis (also known as Ormond's disease in 1948.)

== Biography ==
He was born on March 25, 1886, in Armstrong County, Pennsylvania. He died February 25, 1978, in Ann Arbor, Michigan.
