= Pseudolymphoma =

- Specialty: Angiology

Pseudolymphoma is a benign lymphocytic infiltrate that resembles cutaneous lymphoma histologically, clinically, or both.

Lymphoma cutis is the most important type of pseudolymphoma.

== Presentation ==
It manifests with diarrhoea, hepatosplenomegaly, moderate lymph node enlargement without histopathological changes and evidence of the reticulo-endothelial system involvement.

== Cause ==
It is an adverse effect of phenytoin.
