= Mediastinal fibrosis =

- Mediastinal fibrosis is inherited in an autosomal recessive manner
- Specialty: Pulmonology
- Causes: histoplasmosis
- Treatment: glucocorticoids or immunosuppressants

Mediastinal fibrosis is characterized by invasive, calcified fibrosis centered on lymph nodes that block major vessels and airways. In Europe, this disease is exceptionally rare. More cases are seen in USA where the disease may often be associated with histoplasmosis.

== See also ==
- Mediastinitis
