= Phlebitis =

Inflammation of the veins

- Other names: venitis
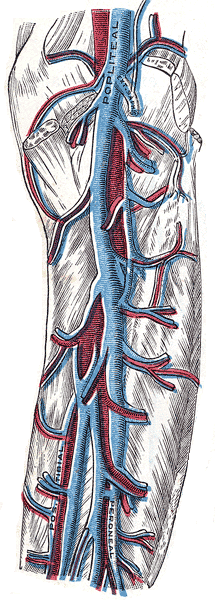
- Veins in the popliteal area
- Specialty: Phlebology

Phlebitis (or venitis) is inflammation of a vein, usually in the legs. It most commonly occurs in superficial veins. Phlebitis often occurs in conjunction with thrombosis (clotting inside blood vessels) and is then called thrombophlebitis or superficial thrombophlebitis. Unlike deep vein thrombosis, the probability that superficial thrombophlebitis will cause a clot to break up and be transported in pieces to the lung is very low.

== Signs and symptoms ==
- Localized redness and swelling
- Pain or burning along the length of the vein
- Vein being hard and cord-like

There is usually a slow onset of a tender red area along the superficial veins on the skin. A long, thin red area may be seen as the inflammation follows a superficial vein. This area may feel hard, warm, and tender. The skin around the vein may be itchy and swollen. The area may begin to throb or burn. Symptoms may be worse when the leg is lowered, especially when first getting out of bed in the morning. A low-grade fever may occur. Sometimes phlebitis may occur where a peripheral intravenous line was started. The surrounding area may be sore and tender along the vein.

== Cause ==
Phlebitis is typically caused by local trauma to a vein, usually from the insertion of an intravenous catheter. However, it can also occur due to a complication of connective tissue disorders such as lupus, or of pancreatic, breast, or ovarian cancers. Phlebitis can also result from certain medications and drugs that irritate the veins, such as desomorphine.

Superficial phlebitis often presents as an early sign in thromboangiitis obliterans (Buerger's disease), a vasculitis that affects small and medium-sized arteries and veins in distal extremities often associated with cigarette smoking.

== Management ==
Treatment usually consists of NSAIDs, such as ibuprofen and local compression (e.g., by compression stockings or a compress). If the phlebitis is associated with local bacterial infection, antibiotics may be used.

For acute infusion superficial thrombophlebitis, not enough evidence exists as of 2015 to determine treatment.

== See also ==
- Collapsed vein
- Deep vein thrombosis
- Thrombophlebitis
