= Fibrosis =

Excess connective tissue in healing

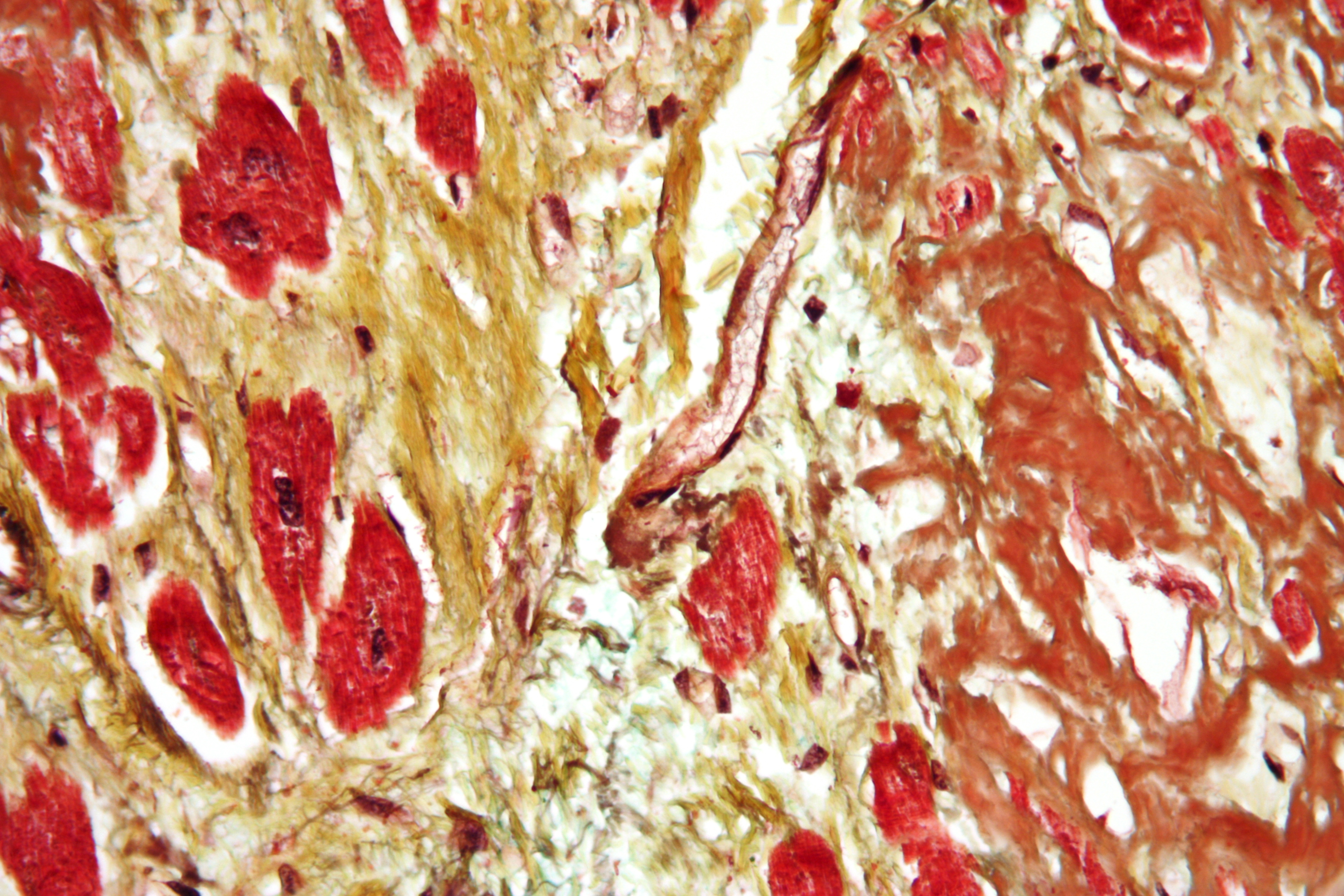
- Micrograph of a heart showing fibrosis (yellow – left of image) and amyloid deposition (brown – right of image). Stained using Movat's stain.
- Specialty: Pathology, rheumatology
- Complications: Cirrhosis
- Risk factors: Repeated injuries, chronic inflammation.

Fibrosis, also known as fibrotic scarring, is the development of fibrous connective tissue in response to an injury. Fibrosis can be a normal connective tissue deposition or excessive tissue deposition caused by a disease.

Repeated injuries, chronic inflammation and repair are susceptible to fibrosis, where an accidental excessive accumulation of extracellular matrix components, particularly collagen, is produced by fibroblasts, leading to the formation of a permanent fibrotic scar.

In response to injury, this is called scarring, and if fibrosis arises from a single cell line, this is called a fibroma. Physiologically, fibrosis acts to deposit connective tissue, which can interfere with or totally inhibit the normal architecture and function of the underlying organ or tissue. Fibrosis can be used to describe the pathological state of excess deposition of fibrous tissue, as well as the process of connective tissue deposition in healing. Defined by the pathological accumulation of extracellular matrix (ECM) proteins, fibrosis results in scarring and thickening of the affected tissue — it is in essence a natural wound healing response which interferes with normal organ function.

== Physiology ==
Fibrosis is similar to the process of scarring, in that both involve stimulated fibroblasts laying down connective tissue, including collagen and glycosaminoglycans. The process is initiated when immune cells such as macrophages release soluble factors that stimulate fibroblasts. The most well characterized pro-fibrotic mediator is TGF beta, which is released by macrophages as well as any damaged tissue between surfaces called interstitium. Other soluble mediators of fibrosis include CTGF, platelet-derived growth factor (PDGF), and interleukin 10 (IL-10). These initiate signal transduction pathways such as the AKT/mTOR and SMAD pathways that ultimately lead to the proliferation and activation of fibroblasts, which deposit extracellular matrix into the surrounding connective tissue. This process of tissue repair is a complex one, with tight regulation of extracellular matrix (ECM) synthesis and degradation ensuring maintenance of normal tissue architecture. However, the entire process, although necessary, can lead to a progressive irreversible fibrotic response if tissue injury is severe or repetitive, or if the wound healing response itself becomes deregulated.

== Anatomical location ==
Fibrosis can occur in many tissues within the body, typically as a result of inflammation or damage. Common sites of fibrosis include the lungs, liver, kidneys, brain, and heart:

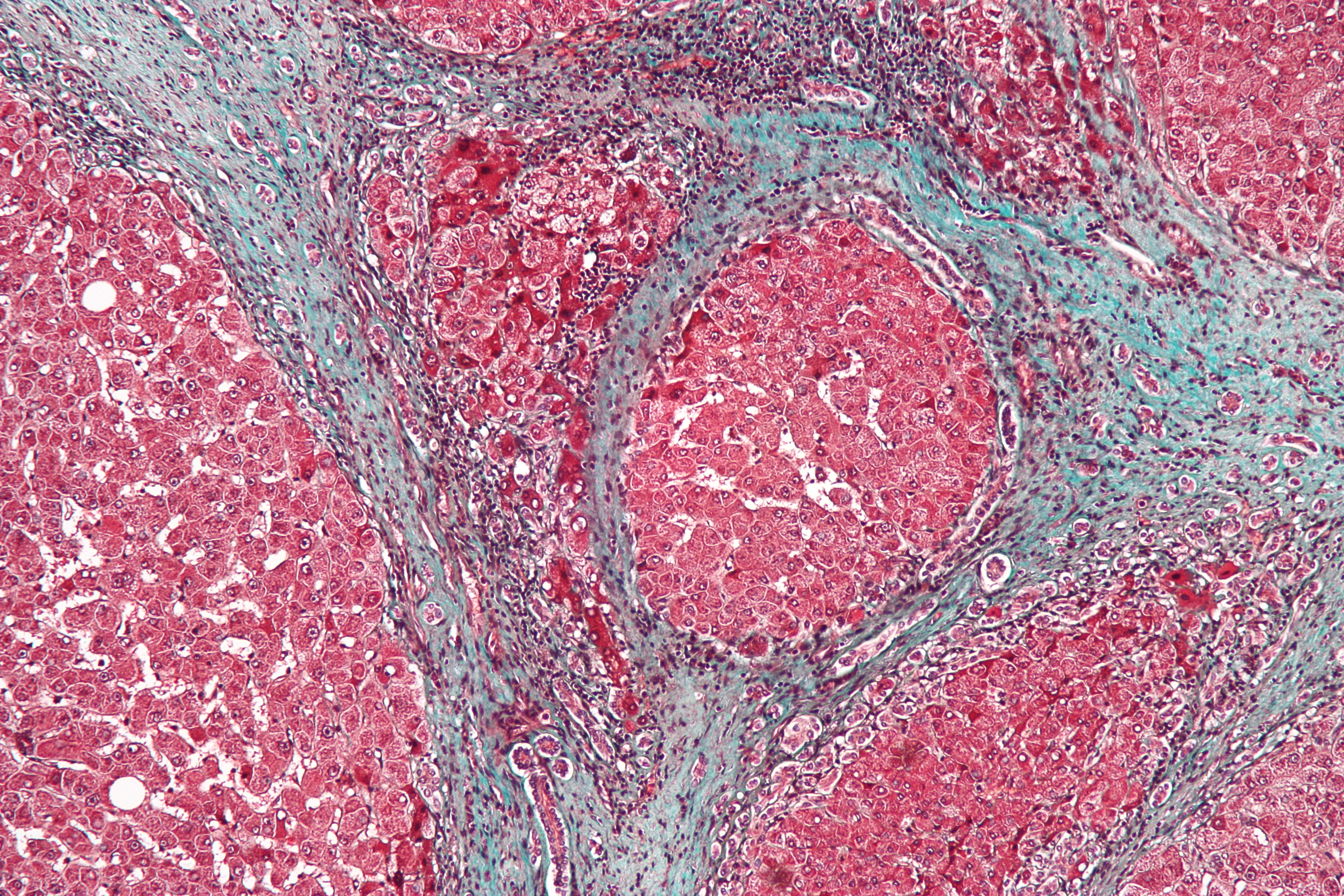
Micrograph showing cirrhosis of the liver. The tissue in this example is stained with a trichrome stain, in which fibrosis is colored blue. The red areas are the nodular liver tissue

=== Lungs ===
- Fibrothorax
- Pulmonary fibrosis
  - Cystic fibrosis
  - Idiopathic pulmonary fibrosis (idiopathic meaning 'of unknown cause')
- Radiation-induced lung injury (following radiation therapies commonly used to treat cancer)

=== Liver ===
- Bridging fibrosis – an advanced stage of liver fibrosis, seen in the progressive form of chronic liver diseases. The term bridging refers to the formation of a "bridge" by a band of mature and thick fibrous tissue from the portal area to the central vein. This form of fibrosis leads to the formation of pseudolobules. Long-term exposure to hepatotoxins, such as thioacetamide, carbon tetrachloride, and diethylnitrosamine, has been shown to cause bridging fibrosis in experimental animal models.
- Senescence of hepatic stellate cells could prevent progression of liver fibrosis, although has not yet been implemented as a therapy due to risks associated with hepatic dysfunction.

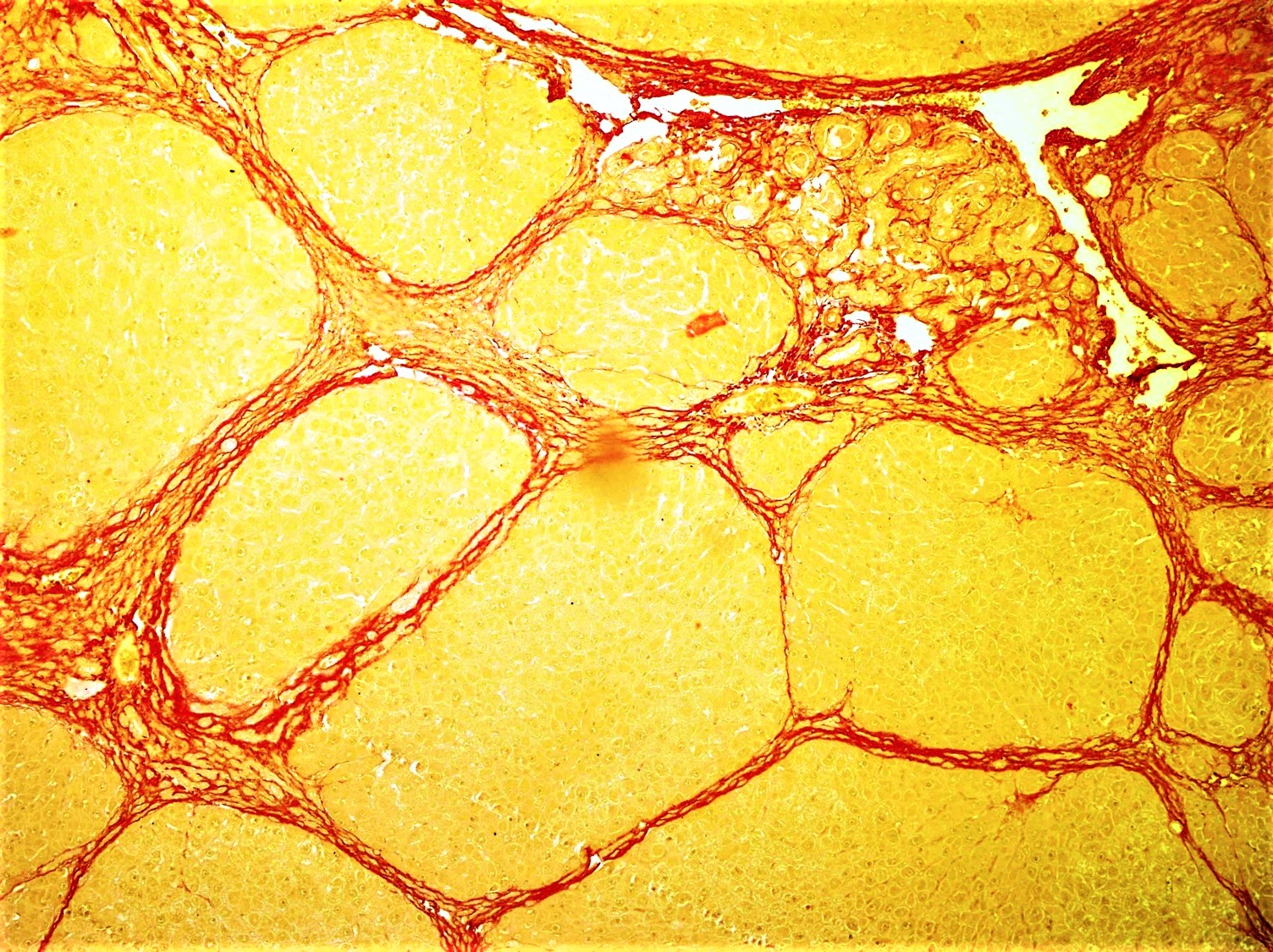
Bridging fibrosis in a Wistar rat following a six-week course of thioacetamide. Sirius Red stain

- Cirrhosis

=== Kidney ===
- CYR61 induction of cellular senescence in the kidney has shown potential to limit renal fibrosis.

=== Brain ===
- Glial scar

=== Heart ===
Myocardial fibrosis has two forms:

- Interstitial fibrosis, described in cases of congestive heart failure and hypertension, and as part of normal cellular aging.
- Replacement fibrosis, indicating tissue damage from previous myocardial infarction.
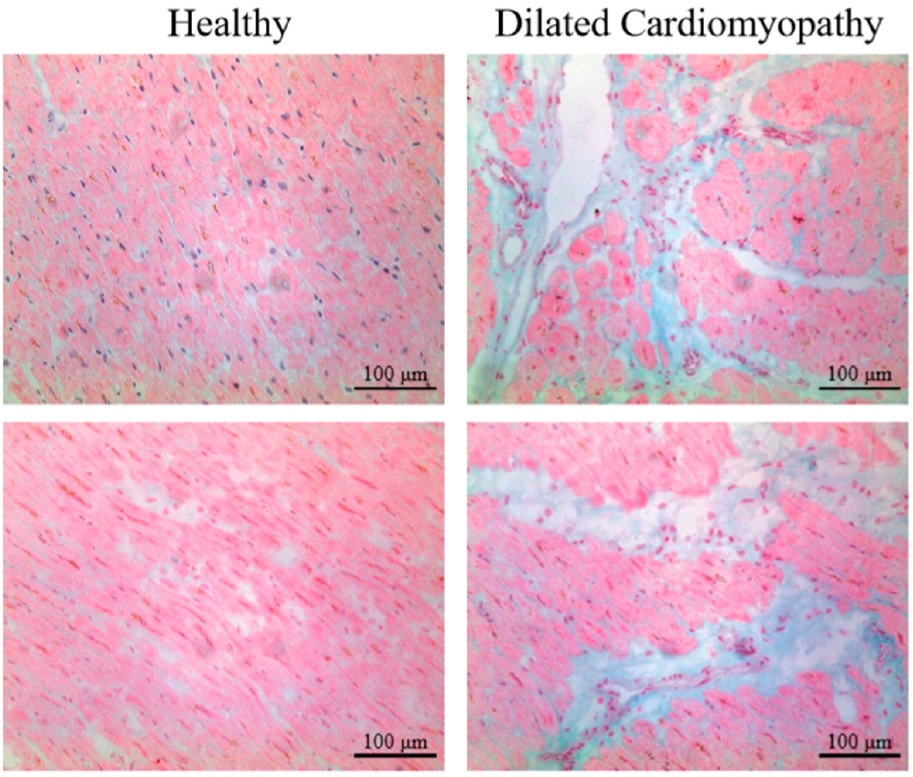
Healthy myocardium versus interstitial fibrosis in dilated cardiomyopathy. Alcian blue stain.

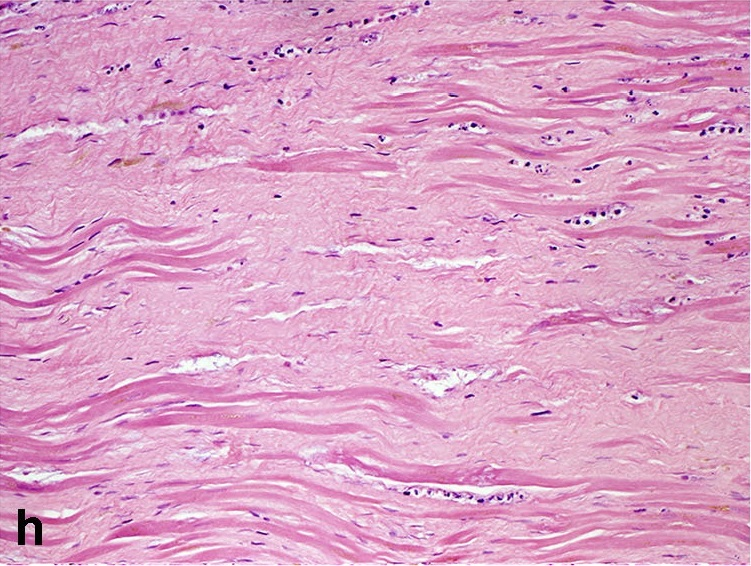
Replacement fibrosis in myocardial infarction, being boundless and dense.

=== Other ===
- Arterial stiffness
- Arthrofibrosis (knee, shoulder, other joints)
- Chronic kidney disease
- Crohn's disease (intestine)
- Dupuytren's contracture (hands, fingers)
- Keloid (skin)
- Lipedema (fat cells, typically in lower limbs)
- Mediastinal fibrosis (soft tissue of the mediastinum)
- Myelofibrosis (bone marrow)
- Myofibrosis (skeletal muscle)
- Peyronie's disease (penis)
- Nephrogenic systemic fibrosis (skin)
- Progressive massive fibrosis (lungs); a complication of pneumoconiosis
- Retroperitoneal fibrosis (soft tissue of the retroperitoneum)
- Scleroderma/systemic sclerosis (skin, lungs)
- Some forms of adhesive capsulitis (shoulder)

Fibrosis reversal

Historically, fibrosis was considered an irreversible process. However, several recent studies have demonstrated reversal in liver and lung tissue, and in cases of renal, myocardial, and oral-submucosal fibrosis.
