= Acute eosinophilic leukemia =

- Specialty: Hematology, oncology

Acute eosinophilic leukemia (AEL) is a rare subtype of acute myeloid leukemia with characteristic tyrosine kinase (TK) gene fusions and sometimes eosinophilia. Before advances in molecular genetics, acute eosinophilic leukemia was described as a distinct subtype of acute non-lymphocytic leukemia with early eosinophilic differentiation and a marker positive for cyanide-resistant peroxidase stain. However, with advances in molecular genetics the current classification system characterizes AEL based on the most common gene rearrangements:

- PDGFRA (FIP1L1:: PDGFRA)
- PDGFRB (ETV6::PDGFRB)
- FGFR1 (ZMYM2::FGFR1)
- JAK2 (CPM1::JAK2, ETV6::JAK2, BCR::JAK2)
- ABL1 (ETV6::ABL1)
- FLT3 (ETV6:: FLT3)

== Pathophysiology ==
The most common chromosomal rearrangement in AEL is the FIP1L1:: PDGFRA. This rearrangement leads to the fusion of genes that cause constitutive activation of the multiple downstream pathways such as tyrosine kinase signaling pathways. This leads to rapid amplification of these gene segments, creating oncogenic fusion proteins that lead to increased cell proliferation causing increased populations of aberrant cells. There are several reasons as to why these fusion genes drive the production of eosinophils specifically.

- The FIP1L1:: PDGFRA rearrangement causes expression of transcription factors such as GATA-1, GATA-2 and C/EBPα which promote the production of eosinophils.
- Both FIP1L1:: PDGFRA and ETV6::PDGFRB rearrangements activate NF-κB that promotes the expression of markers found on eosinophils including the IL-5 receptor and eosinophil peroxidase. Furthermore, lyn kinase, an enzyme that is activated in FIP1L1:: PDGFRA positive cells, has been shown to enhance IL-5 production, which in turn promotes eosinophil production.
- FIP1L1:: PDGFRA rearrangements also cause phosphorylation of PIAS1 which in turn stabilizes the aberrant fusion protein, which allows continued production of eosinophils over time.

== Risk factors ==
Acute eosinophilic leukemia is an extremely rare disease with an incidence of 0.18 cases per million people, for the most common FIP1L1:: PDGFRA disease subtype. Amongst all the known genetic subtypes of the disease, males appear to be disproportionately affected: of 151 patients surveyed in a french study with FIP1L1:: PDGFRA disease, 143 (95%) were male. The PDGFRA, PDGFRB and JAK2 subtypes all show strong male predominance, whereas the FGFR subtype shows moderate male predominance and the FLT3/ABL1 subtype shows variable male predominance. The national comprehensive cancer network (NCCN) has shown that male gender combined with an elevated serum tryptase level has a high likelihood of being positive for FIP1L1:: PDGFRA disease. The mean age of diagnosis is 49 years however, the disease can present at any age, with pediatric cases being diagnosed more readily.

FIP-score was recently developed as a screener for FIP1L1:: PDGFRA disease and identified being under the age of 66 years as an independent predictor for testing positive for the gene fusion. Overall, genetic subtype is the primary determinant of the risk for neoplastic blast phase transformation, with the FIP1L1:: PDGFRA subtype having the highest risk of transformation.

Several clinical features can be identified through laboratory testing, physical exam, and pathology reports that suggest development of a neoplastic process rather than benign eosinophilia:

- Elevated serum tryptase level (elevated in 79% of FIP1L1:: PDGFRA subtype).
- Elevated serum B12 (elevated in 94% of FIP1L1:: PDGFRA subtype).
- Splenomegaly (present in 44% of FIP1L1:: PDGFRA subtype) and/ or lymphadenopathy.
- Abnormal T-cell population.
- Increased blasts, dysplasia, cytogenic or molecular abnormality, and/ or bone marrow fibrosis.

== Signs and symptoms ==
The clinical presentation of acute eosinophilic leukemia is highly variable and dependent on the specific genetic subtype, disease phase, and target organ involvement. Some of the hematologic features include:

- Sustained eosinophilia (>1.5x10^9/L) or tissue eosinophilia of a target organ (eosinophilia may not always be present).
- Splenomegaly (present in 44% of FIP1L1:: PDGFRA subtype) and/ or lymphadenopathy.
- Anemia and thrombocytopenia
- Leukoerythroblastosis (immature red and white blood cells in the peripheral blood)
- Monocytosis (>1x10^9/L in 33% of patients, mostly with hypereosinphilia)
- Lymphadenopathy
- Elevated serum tryptase level (elevated in 79% of FIP1L1:: PDGFRA subtype).
- Elevated serum B12 (elevated in 94% of FIP1L1:: PDGFRA subtype).

Eosinophils release cytotoxic substances that can cause end-organ damage in multiple organ systems:

- Cardiac involvement (19% of FIP1L1:: PDGFRA patients) causing eosinophilic endomyocarditis
  - Elevated cardiac troponin/ NT-proBNP
  - Abnormal ECG or cardiac MRI
  - Sub-endocardial fibrosis (may be irreversible if not treated promptly)
- Pulmonary involvement (30% of FIP1L1:: PDGFRA patients)
  - Severe prolonged cough (may be the only symptom for years)
  - Difficulty breathing and shortness of breath
- Cutaneous involvement (32% of FIP1L1:: PDGFRA patients)
  - Skin rashes
  - Pruritus
  - Dermatitis
- Neurologic involvement (9% of FIP1L1:: PDGFRA patients)
  - Confusion
  - Changes in behavior
  - Impaired movement and sensations
  - Peripheral neuropathy

In rare cases, the first and most aggressive presentation of AEL is the blast phase, which is defined as >20% blasts circulating in the blood, and causes generalized symptoms such as fatigue, fever, bone pain, bleeding and frequent infections. Other characteristic features of the blast phase are as follows:

- Acute myeloid leukemia (AML) with eosinophilia
- B-cell or T-cell acute lymphoblastic leukemia (ALL)
- Mixed phenotype acute leukemia
- Extra-medullary disease is present in 47% of blast phase patients and can present as:
  - Myeloid sarcoma
  - B-cell or T-cell lymphoblastic lymphoma
  - Mixed phenotype acute leukemia at extra-medullary sites

== Diagnosis ==
Several clinical situations require urgent intervention with IV corticosteroids, for example:

- Cardiac involvement with elevated troponin levels or abnormal ECG findings
- Severe respiratory compromise
- Neurological deterioration
- Rapidly progressive organ damage

If the patient is not at the risk of requiring urgent intervention, it is important to rule out reactive or secondary eosinophilia. Common causes of reactive eosinophilia include: parasitic infections (strongyloides, toxocara, ascaris), allergic conditions (Asthma, atopic dermatitis, allergic rhinitis), drug reactions (antibiotics, NSAIDs, anticonvulsants), and autoimmune/ inflammatory diseases (eosinophilic granulomatosis with polyangitis, inflammatory bowel disease). Hypereosinophilia (>1.5x10^9/L) is rarely explained by allergy alone and should always prompt further workup.

Initial laboratory and bone marrow workup for suspected disease includes the following:

- CBC with differential to help identify monocytosis, dysplasia or increased numbers of circulating blast cells
- Comprehensive metabolic panel to identify changes in uric acid levels, LDH, and liver function tests to assess any end-organ damage.
- Serum tryptase, ESR, and/ or CRP
- Quantitative serum immunoglobulin levels (including IgE)
- Bone marrow aspirate and biopsy with
  - Immunohistochemistry (IHC) for tryptase/ CD117/CD25/CD30/CD2
  - Flow cytometry for mast cell markers
  - Reticulin/ collagen stains for fibrosis
- T-cell immunophenotyping through flow cytometry to detect abnormal T-cell phenotypes
- Myeloid mutation panel through next generation sequencing (NGS)

The cytogenic and molecular testing diagnostic algorithm is based on the karyotype findings:

- If the karyotype is normal:
  - Perform Fluorescence In Situ Hybridization (FISH) for PDGFRA
  - If FISH is negative, perform RT-qPCR for FIP1L1::PDGFRA
  - A combination of FISH and RT-PCR is most sensitive, particularly when clinical suspicion is high.

Next-generation sequencing (NGS) can provide additional diagnostic value in the following scenarios:

- Identifying clonality when TK gene fusions are negative (mutations in TET2, ASXL1, EHZ2, SETBP1, STAT5B)
- Detecting novel gene fusions not identified by standard methods
- Distinguishing chronic eosinophilic leukemia (CEL) from idiopathic hypereosinophilic syndrome (HES)
- Identifying additional mutations that may impact prognosis (RUNX1 in 83% of FGFR1-rearranged patients).

It is still important to assess the pathogenicity of the variants to distinguish true driver mutations from clonal hematopoiesis of indeterminate potential (CHIP).

Next, the acute disease stage should be determined using the following criteria for appropriate treatment:

- >20% blasts in the bone marrow and/or peripheral blood that present as:
  - AML (61% of blast cell cases)
  - ALL (B-cell or T-cell are 39% of blast phase cases)
  - Mixed phenotype acute leukemia
  - Extra-medullary disease (47% of blast phase patients)

Other differential diagnoses that should be excluded:

- BCR-ABL1-positive CML
- Polycythemia vera, essential thrombocytopenia, primary myelofibrosis
- Chronic neutrophilic leukemia
- BCR::ABL1 negative atypical CML
- Systemic mastocytosis (requires KIT D816V testing)

== Prognosis ==
The prognosis of acute eosinophilic leukemia is dependent on the specific genetic subtype:

- PDGFRA and PDGFRB rearranged disease has an excellent prognosis with imatinib therapy.
  - 100% complete hematologic response (CHR) is achieved in all imatinib-treated patients.
  - Complete molecular response (CMR) in 95% of patients
  - 1-year survival rate is 99%
  - 5-year survival rate is 95%
  - 10-year survival rate is 84%
  - Only 6% secondary blast phase rate, with average time to progression being 87 months.

With Imatinib treatment, CHR is typically achieved by 1 month and complete cytogenic response by 3 months with doses as low as 100–200 mg weekly having sustained responses.

- FGFR1, JAK2, ABL1, and FLT3-rearranged disease follow an aggressive clinical course and have poor outcomes.
  - 35% secondary blast phase rate with average time to progression being 19 months.
  - Survival from blast phase diagnosis is 1.7 years
  - Outside of allogeneic hematopoetic stem cell transplant, survival with conventional therapy is dismal.
  - With allogeneic hematopoetic stem cell transplant, 5 year survival is 74%, and progression free survival is 63%.

== Treatment ==
Treatment of acute eosinophilic leukemia is highly dependent on the genetic subtype of the disease, as well as the imatinib sensitivity. As mentioned above, all patients should be assessed for clinical situations with tropoinemia or abnormal echocardiogram, that might require immediate treatment with oral or high dose-IV corticosteroids and cardiology consultation. Below are the treatment regimens for both the blast and chronic phases of the disease as well as management in cases encountering resistance to treatment, based on the genetic characterization of the AEL:

- PDGFRA-rearranged disease: imatinib has demonstrated the best responsiveness in PDGFRA-rearranged disease.
  - Blast phase: Imatinib 100–400 mg daily with corticosteroids if cardiac involvement is present. If the FIP1L1::PDGFRA genotype is detected after introduction of chemotherapy, then imatinib can be added to AML or ALL-type induction, or imatinib monotherapy could be considered if response has been adequate.
  - Chronic phase: Imatinib 100 mg daily with a 7-10 day corticosteroid course if cardiac involvement is present. CHR is expected to be seen by 1 month and complete cytogenetic response by 3 months in most patients if treatment is effective.
  - Resistance management: Resistant mutations of the PDGFRA subtype include T674I and D842V. Evaluation for HCT should be considered, as well as clinical trials. Avapritinib may have a role in resistant disease with D842V mutations.
- PDGFRB-rearranged disease: treatment is the same as it is for PDGFRA-rearranged disease above.
- FGFR1-rearranged disease: This subtype has a more aggressive clinical course and poor outcomes with conventional therapy.
  - Blast phase: Clinical trial or pemigatinib, as well as early referral to allogeneic HCT, is recommended, as well as the following lineage-based treatments:
    - Myeloid: Tyrosine-kinase inhibitor ± AML type induction chemotherapy to start, and allogeneic HCT if no response.
    - Lymphoid: Tyrosine-kinase inhibitor ± ALL type induction chemotherapy to start, and allogeneic HCT if no response.
    - Mixed phenotype: Tyrosine-kinase inhibitor ± AML type induction chemotherapy to start, and allogeneic HCT if no response.
  - Chronic phase: Clinical trial or pemigatinib as well as early referral to allogeneic HCT is recommended. Tyrosine-kinase inhibitors such as midostaurin or ponatinib with activity against the FGFR1 genotype can also be used.
- JAK2-rearranged disease:
  - Blast phase: Clinical trials and early referral to allogeneic HCT are recommended. Tyrosine-kinase inhibitors with activity against JAK2 ± AML/ALL-type induction chemotherapy can be tried.
  - Chronic phase: Clinical trials are recommended as well as tyrosine-kinase inhibitors with activity against JAK2, such as ruxolitinib is most commonly used. Other JAK inhibitors such as fedratinib, momelotinib, or pancritinib can also be used if ruxolitinib is unavailable or intolerant.
- ABL1-rearranged disease: Clinical trial is recommended, although dasatinib or nilotinib can be tried for chronic phase. Other recommendations include gilteritinib, midostaurin, quizartinib, sorafenib and sunitinib. Early referral to allogeneic HCT is recommended for the blast phase.
- FLT3-rearranged disease: Clinical trial is recommended, although gilteritinib, midostaurin, quizartinib, sorafenib and sunitinib can also be tried for chronic phase. Early referral to allogeneic HCT is recommended for the blast phase.
