= Crenolanib =

Names
- IUPAC name 1-(2-{5-[(3-methyloxetan-3-yl)methoxy]-1H-benzimidazol-1-yl}quinolin-8-yl)piperidin-4-amine
- Other names CP-868,596; AR-868,596-26

Identifiers
CAS Number	670220-88-9
3D model (JSmol)	Interactive image
ChEBI	CHEBI:145365
ChEMBL	ChEMBL2105728; ChEMBL2146086
ChemSpider	8541584
IUPHAR/BPS	7882
KEGG	D10102
PubChem CID	10366136
UNII	LQF7I567TQ
CompTox Dashboard (EPA)	DTXSID50985873
- InChI: InChI=1S/C26H29N5O2/c1-26(14-32-15-26)16-33-20-6-7-22-21(13-20)28-17-31(22)24-8-5-18-3-2-4-23(25(18)29-24)30-11-9-19(27)10-12-30/h2-8,13,17,19H,9-12,14-16,27H2,1H3 Key: DYNHJHQFHQTFTP-UHFFFAOYSA-N
- SMILES: O(c5cc4ncn(c1nc3c(cc1)cccc3N2CCC(N)CC2)c4cc5)CC6(COC6)C

Properties
Chemical formula	C_{26}H_{29}N_{5}O_{2}
Molar mass	443.551 g·mol^{−1}
- Except where otherwise noted, data are given for materials in their standard state (at 25 °C [77 °F], 100 kPa). verify (what is ?) Infobox references

Crenolanib besylate (CP-868,596-26 or AR-868,596-26, 4-piperidinamine, 1-[2-[5-[(3-Methyl-3-oxetanyl) methoxy]-1H-benzimidazol-1-yl]- 8-quinolinyl]-, monobenzenesulfonate) is an investigational inhibitor being developed by AROG Pharmaceuticals, LLC. As of 2014, the compound was being evaluated for safety and efficacy in clinical trials for various types of cancer, including acute myeloid leukemia (AML), gastrointestinal stromal tumor (GIST), and glioma.

Crenolanib is an orally bioavailable benzimidazole that selectively and potently inhibits signaling of wild-type and mutant isoforms of class III receptor tyrosine kinases (RTK) FLT3 (FMS-like Tyrosine Kinase 3), PDGFR α (Platelet-Derived Growth Factor Receptor), and PDGFR β. Unlike most RTK inhibitors, crenolanib is a type I mutant-specific inhibitor that preferentially binds to phosphorylated active kinases with the ‘DFG in’ conformation motif.

== Background ==
Type III Receptor tyrosine kinase, including FLT3, PDGFRα and PDGFRβ, have been directly implicated in the pathogenesis of epithelial, mesenchymal, and hematological malignancies.

Mutations of FLT3 comprise one of the most frequently identified types of genetic alterations in acute myeloid leukemia. Approximately one-third of AML patients present with a mutation in this gene. The majority of these mutations result in constitutive activation of downstream signaling pathways and aberrant cell growth. Mutations in FLT3 have also been reported in acute lymphoblastic leukemia (ALL) and myelodysplastic syndrome (MDS).

Activating mutations in PDGFRA have been detected in 5-12% of Gastrointestinal stromal tumor. Fusion of PDGFRA has been found to be responsible for hematological malignances like hypereosinophilic syndrome. The amplification of chromosome 4q12, the site of the PDGFRA gene, has been identified in 13-29% of adult gliomas and in 29% to 36% of diffuse intrinsic pontine gliomas (DIPG), a subset of high-grade gliomas (HGG) in pediatric patients. Activation of PDGFRB, a third member of the type III RTK family, has been implicated in the development of chronic myelomonocytic leukemia due to the fusion of PDGFRB with the TEL gene. Furthermore, PDGFB translocation to the COL1A1 gene locus has been identified to be responsible for dermatofibrosarcoma protuberans (DFSP). In cancer cells, PDGFR promotes tumor development and migration via proto-oncogenic downstream mediators like AKT and MEK. In stromal fibroblasts, PDGFRα activation leads to local tissue invasion, production and secretion of VEGF, and elevated intratumoral interstitial pressure. In stromal pericytes, PDGFRβ activation mediates vascular stability. Thus, either FLT3 or PDGF/PDGFR pathway is the primary driver of oncogenesis in the above malignancies and can be targeted by crenolanib therapy.

== Mechanism ==
=== FLT3: wild-type and mutant ===
Crenolanib inhibits both wild type FLT3 and its constitutively active mutations. In vitro studies have shown that crenolanib has low K_{d} for the FLT3 enzyme with constitutively activating internal tandem duplication (ITD) mutations and tyrosine kinase domain (TKD) mutations, D835H and D835Y, as compared to wild type. Crenolanib tightly binds to FLT3-ITD, FLT3-D835H and FLT3-D835Y with K_{d} of 0.74 nM, 0.4 nM, and 0.18 nM, respectively. Crenolanib inhibits the phosphorylation of the FLT3-ITD receptor in transfected TF-1 cells and the FLT3-D835Y TKD mutation in transfected Ba/F3 cells at nanomolar IC50 concentrations of 1.3 nM and 8.8 nM, respectively. Immunoblot experiments performed in the Molm14 FLT3-ITD positive cell line show that crenolanib inhibits downstream signaling of FLT3 at a concentration of 10 nM. MTT assay measurements of crenolanib cytotoxicity evaluated in the FLT3-ITD expressing cell lines Molm14 and MV411, showed that crenolanib is toxic at IC50 concentrations of 7 nM and 8 nM, respectively.

=== PDGFRα: wild-type and mutant ===
Crenolanib has been shown to inhibit PDGFRα with an IC50 of 0.4 ng/mL in porcine aortic epithelial cell lines. In Chinese hamster ovary (CHO) cells expressing PDGFRα, crenolanib inhibited the phosphorylation of wild type PDGFRα at an IC50 of 10 nM. Additionally, crenolanib completely blocked PDGFRα phosphorylation and downstream AKT signaling at a concentration between 0.1 and 1 uM in Ink4a/Arf-/- mouse astrocytes transfected to stably co-express both human PDGFRα and PDGF AA. The lung cancer cell line H1703, which is reported to have amplification of both PDGFRA (4q12) and PDGFC (4q32) genes on chromosome 4, and also overexpress PDGFRα, was sensitive to crenolanib with an IC50 of ~80 nM. In CHO cells expressing an activating exon 18 (D842V) PDGFRα mutation, crenolanib was effective at an IC50 of 6nM and IC90 of 25nM. In addition, crenolanib also inhibited phosphorylation of the double mutants PDGFRα (V561D + D842V and T674I + D842V).

=== PDGFRβ: wild-type ===
Crenolanib has been shown to inhibit PDGFRβ with an IC50 of 0.8 ng/mL in porcine aortic epithelial cell lines. Crenolanib inhibits the ability of recombinant PDGFRβ to phosphorylate a synthetic tyrosine substrate (poly-glutamic acid-tyrosine), with an IC50 of 0.4 ng/mL. Evaluation of the antitumor activity of crenolanib in a genetically engineered BSG DIPG mouse model showed that it is highly selective for PDGFRβ with an IC50 of 10 nM when measured by BrdU assay and 1.25 uM by MTT assay.

=== C-Kit: wild-type and mutant ===
Crenolanib has been shown to have IC50 and Kd values of 67 nM and 78 nM, respectively, for wild type c-KIT in in vitro assays. Similar assays show that crenolanib inhibits c-KIT activating mutations D816H and D816V with IC50 concentrations of 5.4 and 2.5 nM, respectively. Human bone marrow progenitor cell growth assays showed that crenolanib has modest effects on GM-CSF and BFUE driven colony formation at the IC50 concentration of 20 nM.

== Clinical ==
Phase I single-agent and Phase Ib combination studies have investigated the clinical pharmacology of crenolanib in patients with cancer. Pharmacokinetic and safety studies of Crenolanib administered alone or in combination with docetaxel with or without axitinib have been completed. Results suggest that Crenolanib is well tolerated as a single agent, and can also be safely combined with docetaxel and axitinib due to their non-overlapping toxicity profiles.

== Clinical trials ==
- Clinical trial number NCT01229644 for "A Phase II Study of Crenolanib (CP-868,596), a Selective and Potent Inhibitor of PDGFR, for the Treatment of Adult Gliomas" at ClinicalTrials.gov
- Clinical trial number NCT01243346 for "Phase II Study of Crenolanib (CP-868,596), for the Treatment of Patients With Advanced Gastrointestinal Stromal Tumors With the D842-related Mutations and Deletions in the PDGFRA Gene" at ClinicalTrials.gov
- Clinical trial number NCT01393912 for "PDGFR Inhibitor Crenolanib in Children/Young Adults With Diffuse Intrinsic Pontine Glioma or Recurrent High-Grade Glioma" at ClinicalTrials.gov
- Clinical trial number NCT01522469 for "Phase II Study of Crenolanib in Subjects With Relapsed/Refractory AML With FLT3 Activating Mutations" at ClinicalTrials.gov
- Clinical trial number NCT01657682 for "A Phase II Study of Crenolanib in Relapsed/Refractory Acute Myeloid Leukemia Patients With FLT3 Activating Mutations" at ClinicalTrials.gov
