= PAPOLA =

Protein-coding gene in humans

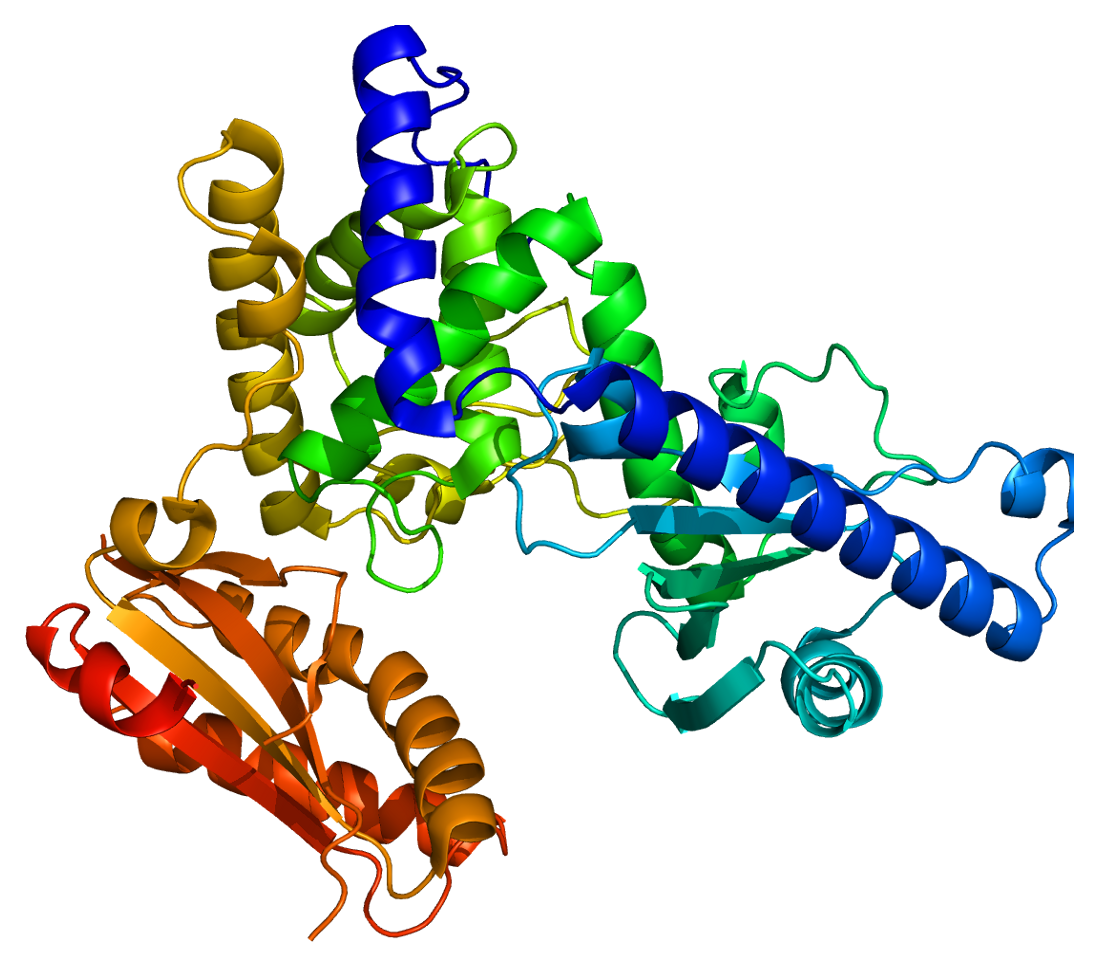

Identifiers
- Aliases: PAPOLA, PAP, poly(A) polymerase alpha, PAP-alpha
- External IDs: OMIM: 605553; MGI: 109301; HomoloGene: 23389; GeneCards: PAPOLA; OMA:PAPOLA - orthologs

Gene location (Human)
Chr.	Chromosome 14 (human)
Band	14q32.2	Start	96,501,433 bp
Band	14q32.2	End	96,567,116 bp

Gene location (Mouse)
Chr.	Chromosome 12 (mouse)
Band	12|12 E	Start	105,750,953 bp
Band	12|12 E	End	105,805,203 bp
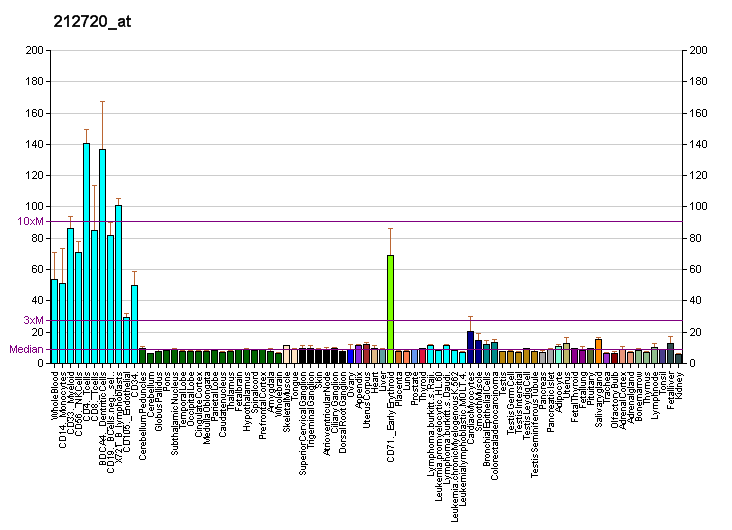

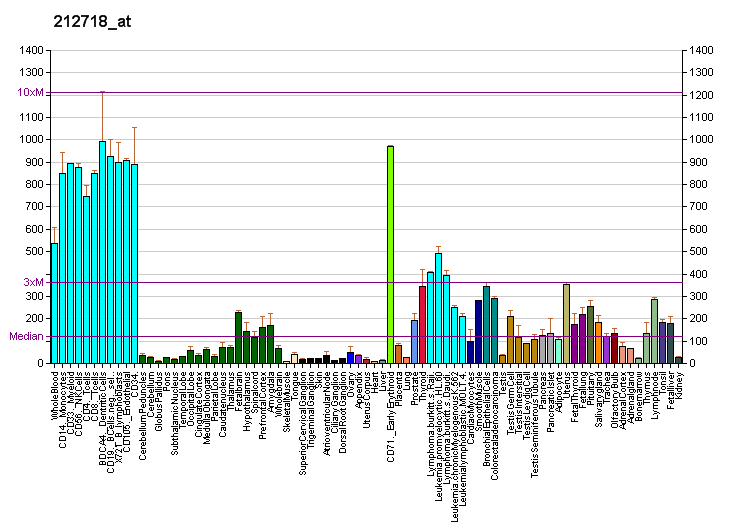

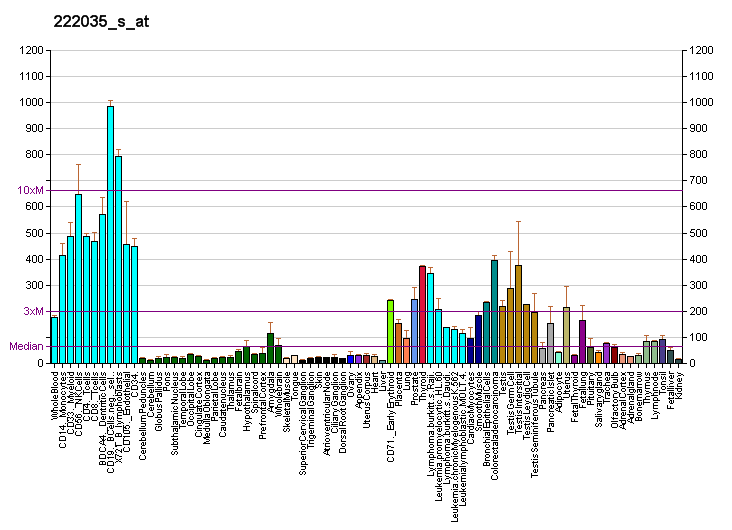
RNA expression pattern
Bgee	Human / Mouse (ortholog); Top expressed in: epithelium of colon; Epithelium of choroid plexus; ventricular zone; ganglionic eminence; Achilles tendon; mucosa of sigmoid colon; bone marrow cells; body of pancreas; endometrium; jejunal mucosa / Top expressed in: genital tubercle; tail of embryo; yolk sac; ventricular zone; neural layer of retina; abdominal wall; dermis; islet of Langerhans; spermatid; decidua; More reference expression data
BioGPS	More reference expression data
Gene ontology
Molecular function	transferase activity; nucleotide binding; nucleotidyltransferase activity; manganese ion binding; metal ion binding; protein binding; RNA binding; ATP binding; magnesium ion binding; polynucleotide adenylyltransferase activity
Cellular component	cytoplasm; nucleoplasm; nucleus
Biological process	mRNA splicing, via spliceosome; termination of RNA polymerase II transcription; RNA 3'-end processing; mRNA processing; mRNA polyadenylation; mRNA 3'-end processing; regulation of mRNA 3'-end processing; RNA polyadenylation
Sources:Amigo / QuickGO
Orthologs
Species	Human	Mouse
Entrez	10914	18789
Ensembl	ENSG00000090060	ENSMUSG00000021111
UniProt	P51003	Q61183
RefSeq (mRNA)	NM_001252006; NM_001252007; NM_001293627; NM_001293628; NM_001293632 NM_032632; NM_001363662; NM_001363664; NM_001363665; NM_001363666	NM_011112; NM_001347440
RefSeq (protein)	NP_001238935; NP_001238936; NP_001280556; NP_001280557; NP_001280561 NP_116021; NP_001350591; NP_001350593; NP_001350594; NP_001350595	NP_001334369; NP_035242
Location (UCSC)	Chr 14: 96.5 – 96.57 Mb	Chr 12: 105.75 – 105.81 Mb
PubMed search
- Wikidata
View/Edit Human	View/Edit Mouse

Poly(A) polymerase alpha is an enzyme that in humans is encoded by the PAPOLA gene.

PAPOLA binds to FIP1L1 (Factor interacting with PAPOLA and CPSF1), a subunit of the cleavage and polyadenylation specificity factor subunit 1 (CPSF1) complex. This complex polyadenylates the 3' end of precursor mRNAs (pre-mRNA) (see CPSF). CPSF1 is an RNA processing protein that binds to uracil-rich sequences in pre-mRNA, binds with and stimulates PAPOLA's Polynucleotide adenylyltransferase activity, and thereby adds adenylyl residues to pre-mRNA. This poly-adenylyl action increases pre mRNA's maturation and movement from the nucleus to cytoplasm while dramatically increasing the stability of the mRNA formed from pre-mRNA: FIP1L1 is a Pre-mRNA 3'-end-processing factor. FIP1L1 gene fusions between it and either the platelet-derived growth factor receptor, alpha (PGDFRA) or Retinoic acid receptor alpha (RARA) genes are causes of certain human diseases associated with pathologically increased levels of blood eosinophils and/or Leukemias.
