= FIP1L1 =

Protein-coding gene in humans

Identifiers
- Aliases: FIP1L1, FIP1, Rhe, hFip1, factor interacting with PAPOLA and CPSF1
- External IDs: OMIM: 607686; MGI: 1914149; HomoloGene: 134000; GeneCards: FIP1L1; OMA:FIP1L1 - orthologs

Gene location (Human)
Chr.	Chromosome 4 (human)
Band	4q12	Start	53,377,641 bp
Band	4q12	End	53,460,862 bp

Gene location (Mouse)
Chr.	Chromosome 5 (mouse)
Band	5|5 C3.3	Start	74,696,110 bp
Band	5|5 C3.3	End	74,759,461 bp
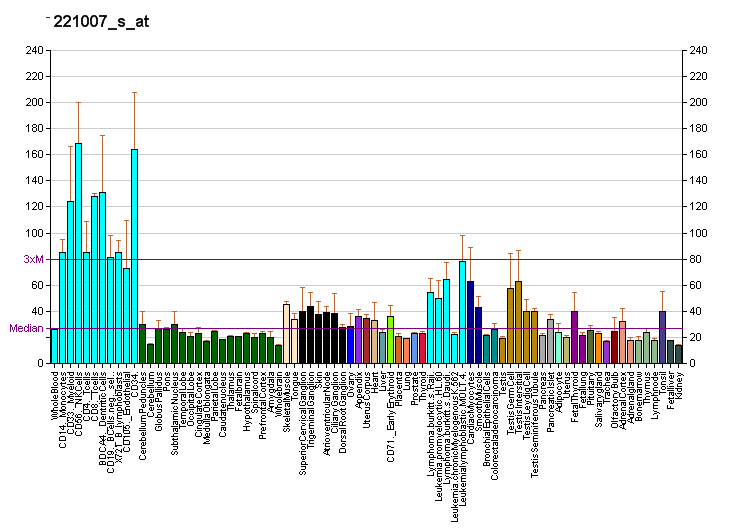
RNA expression pattern
Bgee	Human / Mouse (ortholog); Top expressed in: tendon of biceps brachii; Achilles tendon; gonad; left testis; sural nerve; right testis; ventricular zone; left ovary; ganglionic eminence; internal globus pallidus / Top expressed in: primary oocyte; saccule; tail of embryo; secondary oocyte; zygote; genital tubercle; aortic valve; otic vesicle; supraoptic nucleus; otic placode; More reference expression data
BioGPS	More reference expression data
Gene ontology
Molecular function	protein binding; RNA binding
Cellular component	nucleus; nucleoplasm; mRNA cleavage and polyadenylation specificity factor complex
Biological process	mRNA splicing, via spliceosome; termination of RNA polymerase II transcription; mRNA processing; mRNA 3'-end processing; mRNA export from nucleus; mRNA polyadenylation; pre-mRNA cleavage required for polyadenylation
Sources:Amigo / QuickGO
Orthologs
Species	Human	Mouse
Entrez	81608	66899
Ensembl	ENSG00000145216	ENSMUSG00000029227
UniProt	Q6UN15	Q9D824
RefSeq (mRNA)	NM_001134937; NM_001134938; NM_030917	NM_001159573; NM_001159574; NM_024183; NM_001376964; NM_001376965
RefSeq (protein)	NP_001128409; NP_001128410; NP_112179; NP_001363673; NP_001363674 NP_001363675; NP_001363676; NP_001363677; NP_001363678; NP_001363679; NP_001363680; NP_001363681; NP_001363682; NP_001363683; NP_001363684; NP_001363685; NP_001363686; NP_001363687; NP_001363688; NP_001363689; NP_001363690; NP_001363691; NP_001363693; NP_001363694; NP_001363695; NP_001363696; NP_001363697; NP_001363698; NP_001363699; NP_001363700; NP_001363701; NP_001363702; NP_001363703; NP_001363704; NP_001363705; NP_001363706; NP_001363707; NP_001363708; NP_001363709; NP_001363710; NP_001363711; NP_001363712; NP_001363713; NP_001363714; NP_001363715	NP_001153045; NP_001153046; NP_077145; NP_001363893; NP_001363894
Location (UCSC)	Chr 4: 53.38 – 53.46 Mb	Chr 5: 74.7 – 74.76 Mb
PubMed search
- Wikidata
View/Edit Human	View/Edit Mouse

Factor interacting with PAPOLA and CPSF1 (i.e., FIP1L1; also termed Pre-mRNA 3'-end-processing factor FIP1) is a protein that in humans is encoded by the FIP1L1 gene (also known as Rhe, FIP1, and hFip1). A medically important aspect of the FIP1L1 gene is its fusion with other genes to form fusion genes which cause clonal hypereosinophilia and leukemic diseases in humans.

== Gene ==
The human FIP1L1 gene is located on chromosome 4 at position q12 (4q12), contains 19 exons, and codes for a complete protein consisting of 594 amino acids. However, alternative splicing of its precursor mRNA results in multiple transcript variants encoding distinct FIP1L1 protein isoforms. The FIP1L1 gene is found in a wide range of species, being designated as FIP1 in Saccharomyces cerevisiae (yeast) and fip1l1 in coho salmon as well as mice and numerous other mammalian species.

In humans, an interstitial chromosomal deletion of about 800 kilobases at 4q12 deletes the CHIC2 gene (i.e.cysteine rich hydrophobic domain 2 gene) to create an in-frame fusion of the FIP1L1 gene with the platelet-derived growth factor receptor alpha gene (PGDFRA) gene. The product of PDGFRA, platelet-derived growth factor receptor alpha (PDGFRA), is a tyrosine kinase receptor of the RTK class III. When bound by its proper ligand, platelet-derived growth factor (PDGF), it tyrosine kinase becomes active in phosphorylating proteins that, among other functions, promote cell growth and proliferation. (The FIP1L1-PDGFRA mutation was the first description of a gain of function mutation resulting from an interstitial deletion instead of a chromosomal translocation.) The FIP1L1-PDGFRA fusion gene consists of the 5'-end of FIP1L1 united to the 3'-end of PGDFRA at variable breakpoints in both genes extending over a 40 kilobase region in FIP1L1 and a small region of exon 12 in PDGFRA. The fusion gene may produce a protein consisting of the first 233 amino acids of FIP1L1 joined to the last 523 amino acids of PDGFRA or fused proteins consisting of other FIP1L1 and PDGFRA amino acid lengths. The known FIP1L1-PDGFRA fusion proteins exhibit similar if not identical pathological activities.

A chromosomal translocation of FIP1L1 (4q12) with the retinoic acid receptor alpha gene, i.e. RARA, (17q12) at various points yields a (15;17)(q22;q21) fusion gene, FIP1L1-RARA that also has been implicated in the development of human leukemic diseases in three case reports.

== FIPL1 function ==
FIP1L1 is a subunit of the cleavage and polyadenylation specificity factor subunit 1 (CPSF1) complex that polyadenylates the 3' end of precursor mRNAs (pre-mRNA) (see CPSF). The FIP1 motif of 40 amino acids on FIP1L1 is responsible for its binding to CPSF1. CPSF1 is an RNA processing protein that binds to uracil-rich sequences in pre-mRNA, concurrently binds with and stimulates POPOLA, i.e. polynucleotide adenylyltransferase, and then proceeds to add adenylyl residues to pre-mRNA. This poly-adenylyl action increases pre-mRNA's maturation and movement from the nucleus to cytoplasm while also increasing the stability of the mRNA formed from pre-mRNA: FIP1L1 is a Pre-mRNA 3'-end-processing factor. FIP1L1 gene fusions between it and either the platelet-derived growth factor receptor, alpha (PGDFRA) or retinoic acid receptor alpha (RARA) genes are causes of certain human diseases associated with pathologically increased levels of blood eosinophils and/or leukemias.

== FIP1L1-PDGFRA fusion genes ==
=== Expression ===
FIP1L1-PDGFRA fusion genes have been detected in the eosinophils, neutrophils, mast cells, monocytes, T lymphocytes, and B lymphocytes involved in hematological malignancies. This suggests that the initial underlying genetic defect in these malignancies can begin in myeloid or lymphoid progenitor cells or in precursors to these myeloid and lymphoid progenitor cells. In the majority of instances, this fusion appears in and promotes the proliferation and differentiation of myeloid precursor cells along the eosinophil lineage. In other cases, however, the fusion, while occurring in myeloid precursor cells, promotes proliferation and differentiation of precursor cells along the neutrophil lineage or, less commonly, occurs in lymphoid precursor cells to promote the proliferation and differentiation of precursor cells along the lymphoid lineage.

=== Function ===
FIP1L1-PDGFRA fusion proteins retain PDGFRA-related tyrosine kinase activity but, unlike PDGFRA, their tyrosine kinase is constitutive, i.e. continuously active: the fusion proteins lack the intact protein's 3'-end that includes its juxtamembrane domain which normally blocks tyrosine kinase activity unless PDGFRA is bound to its activating ligand, platelet-derived growth factor. FIP1L1-PDGFRA fusion proteins are also resistant to PDGFRA's normal pathway of degradation, i.e. proteasome-dependent ubiquitination. In consequence, they are highly stable, long-lived, unregulated, and continuously express the stimulating actions of their PDGFRA tyrosine kinase component. In consequence, cells expressing FIP1L1-PDGFRA fusion proteins differentiate and proliferate along eosinophil, other granulocyte, or T lymphocyte lineages and bearers of these mutations suffer either: a) chronic eosinophilia which may progress to hypereosinophilia, the hypereosinophilic syndrome, and chronic eosinophilic leukemia; b) a type of myeloproliferative neoplasm/myeloblastic leukemia not distinguished by eosinophilia; or c) T-lymphoblastic leukemia/lymphoma. At least one case of FIP1L1-PDGFRA-induced disease presented as a myeloid sarcoma with eosinophilia has been reported. (i.e. These pathological proliferation and differentiation responses are due to the unabated activity of the fusion proteins' tyrosine kinase in phosphorylating and thereby activating certain proteins that promote these functions. For example, in vitro studies show that a FIP1L1-PDGFRA fusion gene stimulates CD34+ cells to proliferate and differentiate along the eosinophil lineage by causing the activation of NF-κB, STAT5, and protein kinase B cell signaling pathways. The FIP1L1 component of FIP1L1-PDGFRA is required for the fusion protein to activate STAT4 and protein kinase B.

=== Clinical aspects ===
==== Incidence ====
The age-adjusted incidence of hypereosinophilic syndrome/chronic eosinophilic leukemia reported by the International Classification of Diseases for Oncology (Version 3) is ~0.036 per 100,000 with the mean frequency of FIP1L1-PDGFRA gene fusions occurring in ~10% of patients with hypereosinophilia as detected in developed countries. The fused gene occurs with a male/female ratio of 1.47; the reason for this male predominance is not known. The fusion gene has been found in people of all age groups but only rarely in infants and children.

==== Presentation ====
The ~70% of patients with the FIP1L1-PDGFRA fusion gene (also termed the F/P fusion gene) and marked eosinophilia commonly complain of weakness and malaise. They may also present with or have a history of signs and/or symptoms that are due to the damaging actions of tissue-infiltrating eosinophils such as: skin rashes or erythema; eosinophilic myocarditis (i.e. heart disease which may manifest as coronary artery disease, heart failure due to injured cardiac muscle, restrictive cardiomyopathy due to cardiac fibrosis, or blockage of arteries due to the embolization of blood clots that from in the heart); pulmonary airway and parenchymal disease; eosinophilic gastroenteritis; eosinophilic esophagitis; and dysfunction of other organs targeted by eosinophils. The ~30% of patients in whom the fusion gene effects non-eosinophilic granulocyte or lymphoid cell lineages present with signs and symptoms respectively of acute myeloid leukemia or lymphoma T-lymphoblastic leukemia/lymphoma or lymphocytic leukemia.

==== Diagnosis ====
Patients expressing the eosinophil-driving fusion protein typically present with hypereosinophilia arbitrarily define as blood cell counts containing greater than 1.5x10^{9}/liter eosinophils that have persisted for more than 6 months. However, lower levels of eosinophil counts and/or eosinophilia with a shorter history of duration are not a counter-indication of the diagnoses. These patients also exhibit elevations in their serum levels of vitamin B_{12} and tryptase. Elevations of serum vitamin B_{12} and tryptase are seen regularly in systemic mastocytosis, a disease which may also present with eosinophilia and must be distinguished from FIP1L1-PDGFRA-induced diseases because of the very different treatments for the two types of diseases. Bone marrow examination may reveal increases in eosinophils and mast cells but usually does not contain elevated numbers of precursor cells or cells with microscopically visible chromosome abnormalities. This examination may be useful in excluding other malignant diseases associated with eosinophilia such as acute myeloid leukemia but does not give definitive results indicating FIP1L1-PDGFRA-induced disease. Rather, definitive results are obtained by detecting the presence of the FIP1L1-PDGFRA fusion gene in the blood and/or bone marrow cells of sufferers by cytogenic analysis using fluorescence in situ hybridization or nested reverse transcription polymerase chain reaction testing. Non-eosinophilic forms of FIP1L1-PDGFRA fusion gene-induced diseases are suggested by the presence of morphologically abnormal or excessive numbers of myeloid or lymphoid cells in the blood or bone marrow and, with respect to the lymphoid variants, by the presence of lymphadenopathy and/or lymphoma masses; ultimately, these variants also require demonstration of the FIP1L1-PDGFRA fusion genes for diagnosis.

==== Treatment ====
FIP1L1-PDGFRA fusion gene-induced eosinophil leukemia diseases, unlike most other diseases involving hypereosinophilia, are typically resistant to corticosteroid therapy. However, and unlike most cases of myeloid leukemia, FIP1L1-PDGFRA fusion gene-induced eosinophil leukemia diseases (including a case presenting with myeloid sarcoma) have been treated with great success and long term remissions using low dosages of the tyrosine kinase inhibitor, Imatinib. This drug, also known as Gleevec, has been a FDA-approved and most successful treatment for Philadelphia chromosome-positive chronic myelogenous leukemia (CML) and certain other diseases. More recently, the FDA approved Gleevec for treatingFIP1L1-PDGFRA fusion gene-induced eosinophil leukemia. Commonly, patients suffering this disease respond to low dos (e.g. 100 mg/day) Gleevec but if not attaining complete remission at this dose may require the higher dosages (up to 400/mg/day) typically used to treat CML. Acquired resistance to Gleevec is uncommon but has been observed in patients whose mutated cells develop a T674I or D842V mutation in the fused gene. Should FIP1L1-PDGFRA fusion gene-induced eosinophil leukemia diseases become resistant to or enter an accelerated or blast phase while on Gleevec therapy, the aggressive chemotherapy and/or bone marrow transplantation used to treat aggressive leukemia may be required.

While the success of Gleevec in treating the myeloproliferative neoplasm/myeloblastic leukemia or T-lymphoblastic leukemia/lymphoma forms of FIP1L1-PDGFRA fusion gene-induced disease is unclear, initial treatment with the drug is recommended.

== FIP1L1-RARA ==
RARA, the Retinoic acid receptor alpha gene, is located on human chromosome 17 at position q21.2 (i.e. 17q21.2), consists of 17 exons, and encodes the nuclear retinoic acid receptor alpha (RARA) protein. The RARA protein, when ligand-bound, regulates the expression of genes that are implicated in the control of development, differentiation, apoptosis, myelopoiesis, and the transcription of transcription factors which in turn regulate the transcription of clock genes. Translocations between this 17q21.2 locus and several other loci have been associated with acute promyelocytic leukemia. Three case reports have found that chromosome translocations between FIP1L1 and RARA gene loci are associated with two cases of acute promyelocytic leukemia and one case of juvenile myelomonocytic leukemia. Relatively little is known about function of or therapy for these translocations except that: a) the fusion gene was generated juxtaposing exons 15 and 3 of FIP1L1 and RARA, respectively; b) retinoic acid, a ligand for the RARA protein, is exceptionally potent in causing a human eosinophil line to die by apoptosis; c) the disease responses to retinoic acid as well as more aggressive therapies could not be evaluated because of severity and rapid progression of the diseases; d) and in vitro studies indicate that the FIP1L1-RARA fusion protein represses the activation of RARA-activated genes.
