= RTK class III =

Protein family

RTK class III is a class of receptor tyrosine kinases.

It includes PDGFRα, PDGFRβ, C-KIT, CSF1R, and FLT3.
