= Familial eosinophilia =

- Other names: EOS

Familial eosinophilia is a rare congenital disorder characterized by the presence of sustained elevations in blood eosinophil levels that reach ranges diagnostic of eosinophilia (i.e. 500–1500/microliter) or, far more commonly, hypereosinophilia (i.e. >1,500/microliter). Although high eosinophil levels are associated with certain diseases and thought to contribute to the tissue destruction found in many other eosinophilia-related diseases (see clonal eosinophilia), clinical manifestations and tissue destruction related to the eosinophilia in familial eosinophilia is uncommon: this genetic disease typically has a benign phenotype and course compared to other congenital and acquired eosinophilic diseases.

== Presentation ==
Individuals with familial eosinophilia exhibit hypereosinophilia presumably from birth (earliest documentation at 4 months of age). Elevated blood levels of eosinophils are remarkably stable over time in affected family members. These individuals are generally detected on routine blood cell counts and at the time of diagnosis present without symptoms or at least no symptoms related to their eosinophilia. Their blood cell counts are typically normal except for eosinophil numbers which range between ~2000 and 5000 cells/microliter (normal <450 cells/microliter). Peripheral blood smears revealed that eosinophils showed normal morphology, a finding distinctly different from many other types of hypereosinophilia in which blood smears commonly shown immature blood cells and eosinophils showing distinctly abnormal areas of cytoplasmic clearing. Ultrastructural changes characteristic of eosinophil activation (e.g. piecemeal degranulation of eosinophils and increases in the number of their lipid bodies), other eosinophil activation markers (e.g. elevated serum levels of eosinophil-derived neurotoxin and major basic protein), and increased expression of a marker for T cell activation, interleukin-2 receptor alpha chain, are absent in individuals with familial eosinophilia but common in other types of hypereosinophilia.

=== Accompanying diseases ===
In spite of being generally considered a benign expression of eosinophilia, isolated cases of family members with familial eosinophilia have been afflicted with tissue dysfunctions that are often associated with more pathological forms of eosinophilia. These dysfunctions include fatal endomyocardial fibrosis, valvular heart disease, and diminished motor and/or sensory function in skin areas served by peripheral nerves. Three patients with heart tissue for pathology examination had eosinophilic infiltration or fibrosis in their heart's endomyocardium. One patient who died suddenly had autopsy findings of eosinophilic infiltration not only in the heart but also in lungs, gastrointestinal tract, and meninges. It is unclear whether these tissue damages were due to primary eosinophil infiltrations or eosinophil infiltrations secondary to other causes.

== Genetics ==
Familial eosinophilia is an autosomal dominant disorder. Genetic linkage gene mapping family studies localize the gene responsible for this disease to chromosome 5 at position q31-q33, between markers D5S642 and D5S816. Studies on other disorders associated with high levels of blood eosinophils (e.g. childhood asthma, schistosomiasis) have likewise linked eosinophilia to the q31-q33 area of chromosome 5. The 5q31-q33 region contains a cytokine gene cluster that includes genes for Interleukin 3, interleukin 5, and granulocyte-macrophage colony-stimulating factor. Each of these genes functions to promote the proliferation and differentiation of eosinophil precursor cells. Nonetheless, no gene polymorphisms were found within the promoters, exons, or introns of these 3 genes or in the regions' IL-3/GM-CSF enhancer. In addition to these studies, 8 affected members of a family with familial eosinophilia had peripheral blood or bone marrow cells that carried the same chromosome abnormality, a pericentric inversion of chromosome 10, inv (10) (p11.2q21.2). The meaning and relationship, if any, of this inversion to familial eosinophilia is unclear.

== Pathophysiology ==
Earlier studies found no evidence of abnormal blood levels of interleukin 5, interleukin 3, or granulocyte-macrophage colony stimulating factor. A more recent study used a more sensitive assay for interleukin 5 to compare members of a single extended family with some members lacking the disorder. The study found that members with the disorder had: a) peripheral blood mononuclear cells as well as T helper cells (major physiological source of interleukin 5), CD8+ cells, CD14+ cells, and CD19+ cells that expressed high levels of messenger RNA for interleukin 5 while their peripheral blood mononuclear cells expressed normal levels of messenger RNA for RAD50, a gene in close proximity to IL-5; b) elevated serum levels of interleukin 5 as well as soluble Interleukin 5 receptor alpha subunit; and c) innate lymphoid cells (also major physiological sources of interleukin 5) that produced increased amounts of interleukin 5 in response to stimulation. A second family with asymptomatic eosinophilia over three generations likewise exhibited increased production of interleukin 5. These studies suggest that the dis-regulated overproduction of interleukin 5 by blood mononuclear cells is an underlying cause of the eosinophilia found in at least some families with this disorder.

== Diagnosis ==
The diagnosis of familial eosinophilia rest upon a) familial clustering of the disorder; b) exclusion of "family acquired eosinophilia" (i.e. eosinophilia due to chronic parasite or other infestations that afflict multiple members of a family); c) lack of eosinophil-induced tissue destruction such as that which occurs in the hypereosinophilic syndrome; d) absence of signs or symptoms of other hereditary eosinophilias (e.g. hyperimmunoglobulin E syndrome, Omenn syndrome), Wiskott–Aldrich syndrome, and numerous other primary immunodeficiency syndromes); and d) lack of evidence for reactive eosinophilias (e.g. allergy-related), neoplastic eosinophilias (e.g. eosinophilic leukemia, clonal eosinophilia), or eosinophila associated with various hematological and non-hematological malignancies as outlined in causes of eosinophilia.

== Treatment ==
Since longitudinal data, including eosinophil counts obtained over a 20- to 30-year periods in some family members, show remarkable stability in the absolute eosinophil count with no evidence of disease attributable to eosinophil-related tissue injury, therapy to lower eosinophil counts such as corticosteroids, tyrosine kinase inhibitors, and antibodies directed against interleukin 5 have in general not been used to treat familial eosinophilia. One patient with severe heart damage was treated with a corticosteroid but soon thereafter died. Familial eosinophilia unassociated with possible eosinophil-related tissue injuries may not require drug treatment, those cases with such tissue injuries, it is suggested, should be considered for such interventions. In all cases, however, regular follow-up of the disorder is strongly recommended.
