= Carlo Gambacorti-Passerini =

Italian oncologist and hematologist

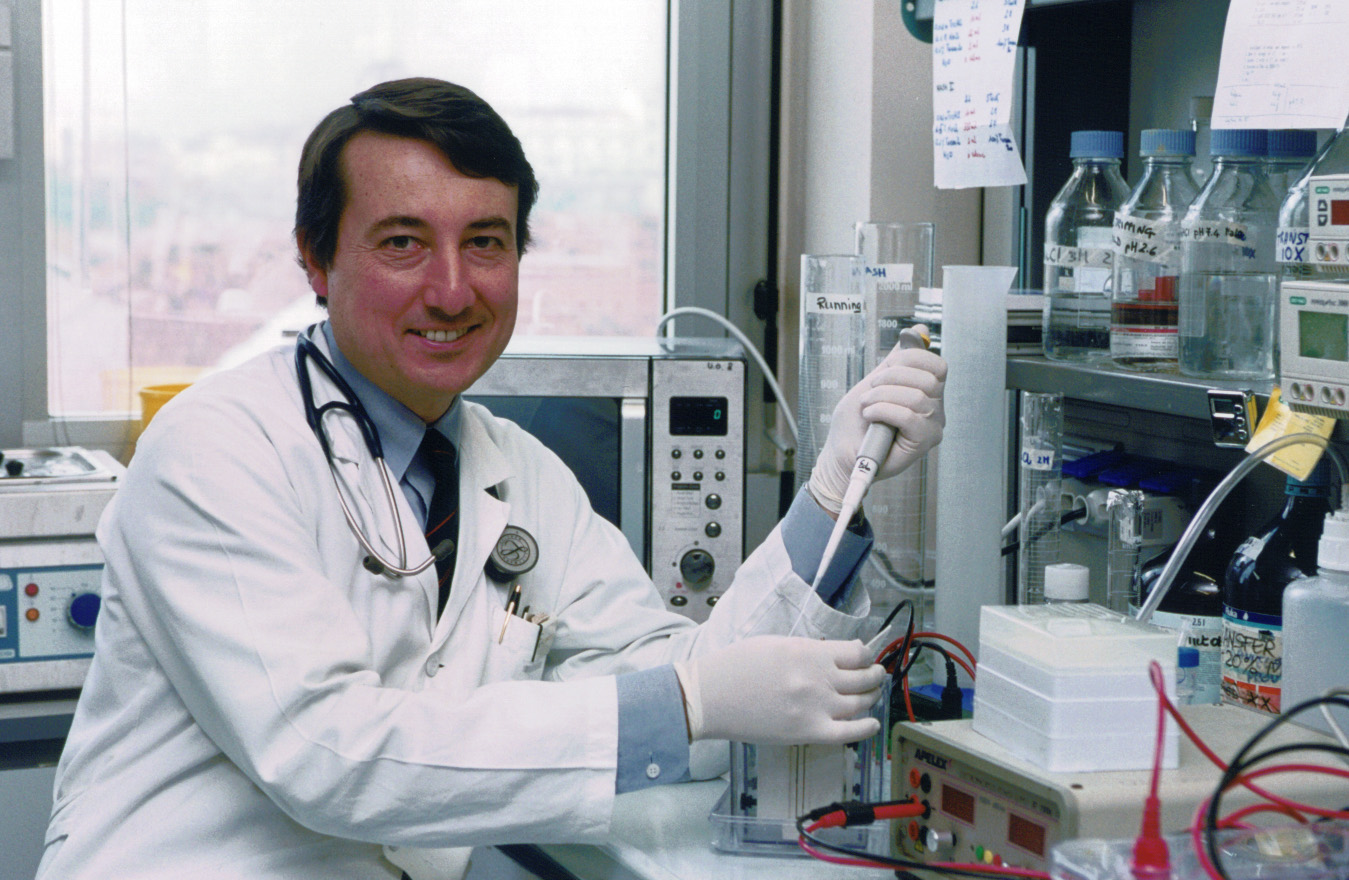
- Born: 26 August 1957 (age 68)

Carlo Gambacorti-Passerini (born 26 August 1957) is an Italian oncologist and hematologist known for his contributions to cancer research.

He is Professor of Internal Medicine and Hematology at the University of Milan Bicocca in Italy and Director of the Hematology Department at S. Gerardo Hospital, Monza, Italy. He was Senior Investigator and Head of the Oncogenic Fusion Proteins Unit at the National Cancer Institute, Milan Italy from 1990 to 2003, and Professor of Oncology and Hematology at McGill University, Montreal, Quebec, Canada, from 2004 to 2007.

== Research ==
His main scientific contribution relates to the preclinical and clinical development of imatinib. His publications between 1997 and 2000 are among the earliest original reports on this revolutionary drug. Specifically, he showed that apoptosis, or programmed cell death, was the predominant mechanism through which imatinib eliminates leukemic cells, that leukemic animals could be cured using imatinib, and that resistance to imatinib could be mediated by gene amplification of BCR-ABL1.

Dr. Gambacorti-Passerini is the Chairman of the ILTE (Imatinib Long Term side Effects) study, an independent clinical study aimed at assessing the long-term effects of imatinib in 948 CML patients worldwide, which showed for the first time that CML patients in remission have a normal life expectancy. From 2006 to 2011, Dr. Gambacorti-Passerini was the first researcher to develop at preclinical and clinical level another drug for CML named bosutinib.

He is also the first researcher who (in June 2010) successfully treated a patient affected by ALK+ lymphoma with an ALK inhibitor (crizotinib). The events which led to the discovery of crizotinib for the treatment of ALK+ lymphomas became part of a novel entitled "Tu sarai la prima" ("You will be the first one", translations sought).

In 2012 and 2015 Dr. Gambacorti-Passerini discovered SETBP1 and ETNK1 as two novel oncogenes and identified specific mutations of these genes in patients affected by atypical Chronic Myeloid Leukemia (aCML).
