= Peripheral vasculopathy =

Peripheral vasculopathy is a general classification for disorders of the blood vessels relative to a person's arms, legs or extremities including peripheral vascular disease.
