= Myeloid sarcoma =

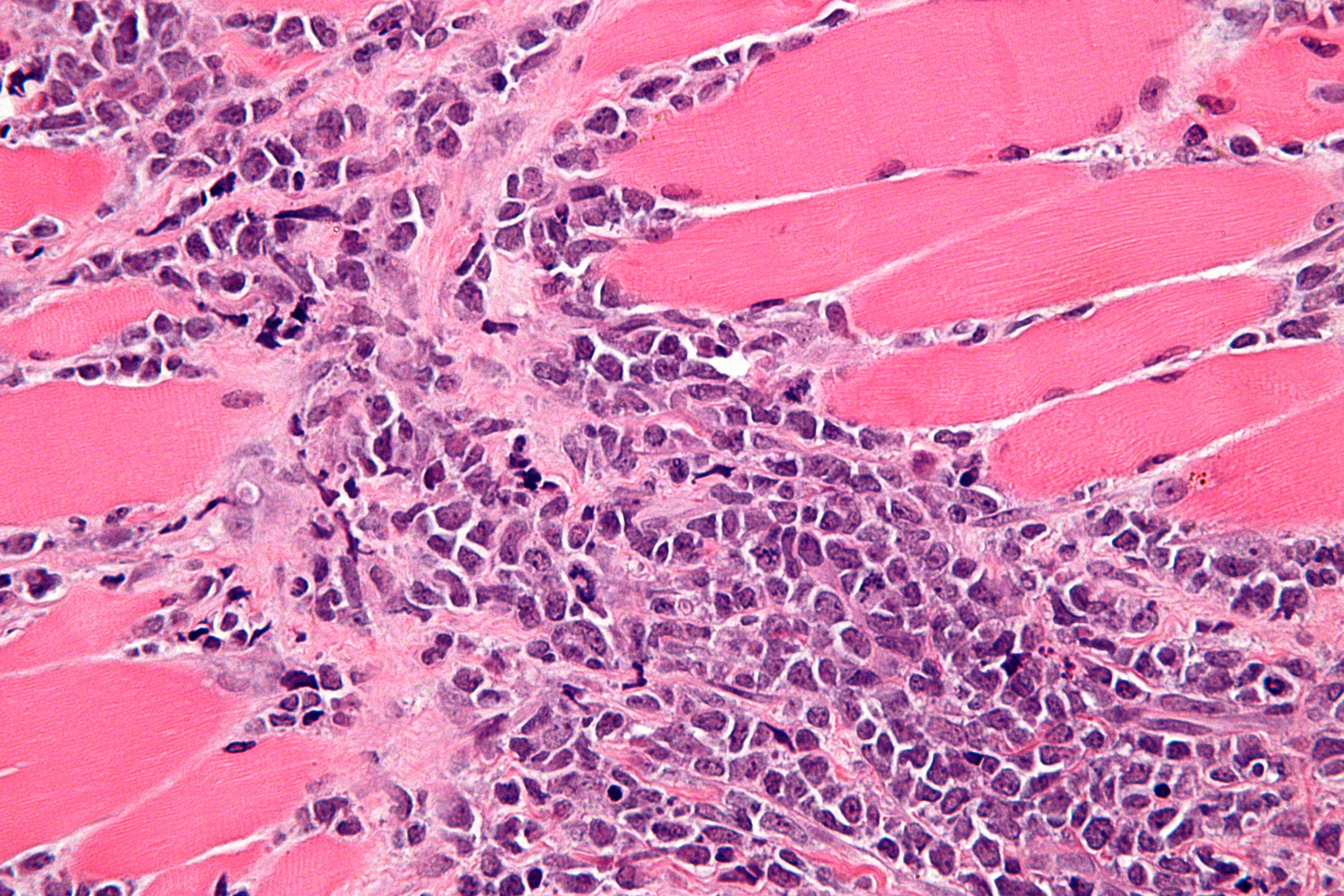
- Micrograph of a myeloid sarcoma within muscle. H&E stain.
- Specialty: Oncology

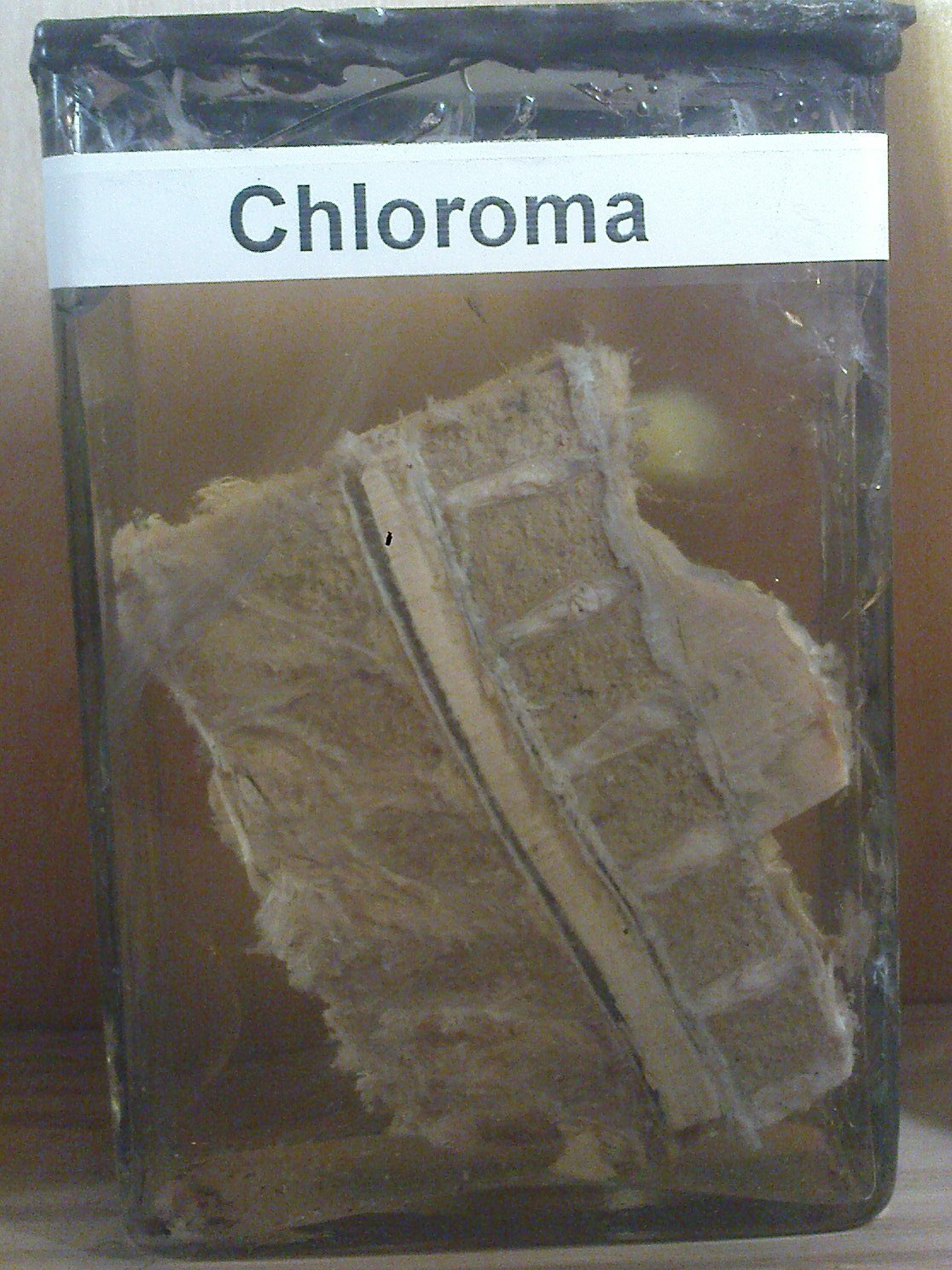
Chloroma

A myeloid sarcoma (chloroma, granulocytic sarcoma, extramedullary myeloid tumor) is a solid tumor composed of immature white blood cells called myeloblasts. A chloroma is an extramedullary manifestation of acute myeloid leukemia; in other words, it is a solid collection of leukemic cells occurring outside of the bone marrow.

== Types ==
=== In acute leukemia ===
Chloromas are rare; exact estimates of their prevalence are lacking, but they are uncommonly seen even by physicians specializing in the treatment of leukemia. Chloromas may be somewhat more common in patients with the following disease features:

- French–American–British (FAB) classification class M2
- WHO Classification (2016 revision) is a separate entity under the "Acute myeloid leukemia (AML) and related neoplasms"
- those with specific cytogenetic abnormalities (e.g. t(8;21) or inv(16))
- those whose myeloblasts express T-cell surface markers, CD13, or CD14
- those with high peripheral white blood cell counts

However, even in patients with the above risk factors, chloroma remains an uncommon complication of acute myeloid leukemia.

Rarely, a chloroma can develop as the sole manifestation of relapse after apparently successful treatment of acute myeloid leukemia. In keeping with the general behavior of chloromas, such an event must be regarded as an early herald of a systemic relapse, rather than as a localized process. In one review of 24 patients who developed isolated chloromas after treatment for acute myeloid leukemia, the mean interval until bone marrow relapse was 7 months (range, 1 to 19 months).

=== In myeloproliferative or myelodysplastic syndromes ===
Chloromas may occur in patients with a diagnosis of myelodysplastic syndrome (MDS) or myeloproliferative syndromes (MPS) (e.g. chronic myelogenous leukemia (CML), polycythemia vera, essential thrombocytosis, or myelofibrosis). The detection of a chloroma is considered de facto evidence these premalignant conditions have transformed into an acute leukemia requiring appropriate treatment. For example, presence of a chloroma is sufficient to indicate chronic myelogenous leukemia has entered its 'blast crisis' phase.

=== In eosinophilic leukemia ===
At least one case of FIP1L1-PDGFRA fusion gene-induced eosinophilic leukemia presenting with myeloid sarcoma and eosinophilia has been reported. This form of myeloid sarcoma is distinguished by its highly successful treatment with imatinib (the recommended treatment for FIP1L1-PDGRGA fusion gene-induced eosinophilic leukemia) rather than more aggressive and toxic therapy.

=== Primary chloroma ===
Very rarely, chloroma can occur without a known pre-existing or concomitant diagnosis of acute leukemia, acute promyelocytic leukemia or MDS/MPS; this is known as primary chloroma. Diagnosis is particularly challenging in this situation (see below). In almost all reported cases of primary chloroma, acute leukemia has developed shortly afterward (median time to development of acute leukemia 7 months, range 1–25 months). Therefore, primary chloroma could be considered an initial manifestation of acute leukemia, rather than a localized process, and could be treated as such. Where disease development or markers indicate progresses to acute promyleocytic leukemia (AML3) treatment should be tailored to this form of disease.

== Location and symptoms ==
Chloromas may occur in virtually any organ or tissue. The most common areas of involvement are the skin (also known as leukemia cutis) and the gums. Skin involvement typically appears as violaceous, raised, nontender plaques or nodules, which on biopsy are found to be infiltrated with myeloblasts Note that leukemia cutis differs from Sweet's syndrome, in which the skin is infiltrated by mature neutrophils in a paraneoplastic process. Gum involvement (gingival hypertrophy) leads to swollen, sometimes painful gums which bleed easily with tooth brushing and other minor trauma.

Other tissues which can be involved include lymph nodes, the small intestine, the mediastinum, the lung, epidural sites, the uterus, the ovaries, and the orbit of the eye. Symptoms of chloroma at these sites are related to their anatomic location; chloromas may also be asymptomatic and be discovered incidentally in the course of evaluation of a person with acute myeloid leukemia.

Central nervous system involvement, as described above, most often takes the form of meningeal leukemia, or invasion of the subarachnoid space by leukemic cells. This condition is usually considered separately from chloroma, as it requires different treatment modalities. True chloromas (i.e. solid leukemic tumors) of the central nervous system are exceedingly rare, but have been described.

== Diagnosis ==
Definitive diagnosis of a chloroma usually requires a biopsy of the lesion in question. Historically, even with a tissue biopsy, pathologic misdiagnosis was an important problem, particularly in patients without a clear pre-existing diagnosis of acute myeloid leukemia to guide the pathologist. In one published series on chloroma, the authors stated that 47% of the patients were initially misdiagnosed, most often as having a malignant lymphoma.

However, with advances in diagnostic techniques, the diagnosis of chloromas can be made more reliable. Traweek et al. described the use of a commercially available panel of monoclonal antibodies, against myeloperoxidase, CD68, CD43, and CD20, to accurately diagnose chloroma via immunohistochemistry and differentiate it from lymphoma. Nowadays, immunohistochemical staining using monoclonal antibodies against CD33 and CD117 would be the mainstay of diagnosis. The increasingly refined use of flow cytometry has also facilitated more accurate diagnosis of these lesions.

== Prognostic significance ==
Evidence is conflicting on the prognostic significance of chloromas in patients with acute myeloid leukemia. In general, they are felt to augur a poorer prognosis, with a poorer response to treatment and worse survival; however, others have reported chloromas associate, as a biologic marker, with other poor prognostic factors, and therefore do not have independent prognostic significance. In case of primary isolated choloroma, prognosis is better

== Treatment ==
As described above, chloromas should always be considered manifestations of systemic disease, rather than isolated local phenomena, and treated as such. In the patient with newly diagnosed leukemia and an associated chloroma, systemic chemotherapy against the leukemia is typically used as the first-line treatment, unless an indication for local treatment of the chloroma (e.g. compromise of the spinal cord) emerges. Chloromas are typically quite sensitive to standard antileukemic chemotherapy. Allogeneic hematopoietic stem cell transplantation should be considered in fit patients with suitable available donor, as long term remissions have been reported.

If the chloroma is persistent after completion of induction chemotherapy, local treatment, such as surgery or radiation therapy, may be considered, although neither has an effect on survival.

Patients presenting with a primary chloroma typically receive systemic chemotherapy, as development of acute leukemia is nearly universal in the short term after detection of the chloroma.

Patients treated for acute leukemia who relapse with an isolated chloroma are typically treated with systemic therapy for relapsed leukemia. However, as with any relapsed leukemia, outcomes are unfortunately poor.

Patients with "preleukemic" conditions, such as myelodysplastic syndromes or myeloproliferative syndromes, who develop a chloroma are often treated as if they have transformed to acute leukemia.

== History ==
The condition now known as chloroma was first described by the British physician A. Burns in 1811, although the term chloroma did not appear until 1853. This name is derived from the Greek word chloros (green), as these tumors often have a green tint due to the presence of myeloperoxidase. The link between chloroma and acute leukemia was first recognized in 1902 by Dock and Warthin. However, because up to 30% of these tumors can be white, gray, or brown rather than green, the more correct term granulocytic sarcoma was proposed by Rappaport in 1967 and has since become virtually synonymous with the term chloroma.

Currently, any extramedullary manifestation of acute myeloid leukemia can be termed a granulocytic sarcoma or chloroma. Specific terms which overlap with granulocytic sarcoma include:

- Leukemia cutis, describing infiltration of the dermis (skin) by leukemic cells, which is also referred to as cutaneous granulocytic sarcoma.
- Meningeal leukemia, or invasion of the subarachnoid space by leukemic cells, is usually considered distinct from chloroma, although very rarely occurring solid central nervous system tumors composed of leukemic cells can be termed chloromas.

In recent years, the term "myeloid sarcoma" has been favored.

== See also ==
- Acute myeloid leukemia
