= Mixed-phenotype acute leukemia =

Mixed-phenotype acute leukemia (MPAL) is a group of blood cancers (leukemia) which have combined features of myeloid and lymphoid cancers. It is a rare disease, constituting about 2–5% of all leukemia cases. It mostly involve myeloid with either of T lymphocyte or B lymphocyte progenitors, but in rare cases all the three cell lineages. Knowledge on the cause, clinical features and cellular mechanism is poor, making the treatment and management (prognosis) difficult.

The name "mixed-phenotype acute leukemia" was adopted by the World Health Organization in 2008 to include leukemias of ambiguous lineage, acute undifferentiated leukemias and natural killer lymphoblastic leukemias. According to WHO criteria, myeloid lineage is characterised by the presence of myeloperoxidase, while B and T lymphoid lineages are indicated by the expression of CD19 and cytoplasmic CD3.

== Molecular biology ==
The fundamental feature of MPAL involves two types of tranlocations that occur in chromosomes 22 and 11. In the former case, there is reciprocal translocation t(9;22)(q34;q11) in chromosome 22, and is known as Philadelphia chromosome. This chromosome portion contains the gene that codes for tyrosine-protein kinase (BCR-ABL1), which is a proto-oncogene. This results in abnormal tyrosine kinase activity that leads to faulty cell signalling, gene expression and resistance to cell death. In the latter case, there is translocation of MLL (KMT2A) gene at chromosome 11q23. The aberrant gene produces fusion proteins that act as transcriptional regulators, which overtake the functions of normal MLL and HOX genes. Some proteins induce histone methylation by activating histone methyltransferases. With updated classification, translocations on chromosome 21 and 22 [t(8;21)(q22;q22)], and on 16 and 22 [t(16;16)(p13.1;q22)], as well as inversion on chromosome 16 (p13.1q22) are also included in MPAL.

One of the most unique features of MPAL is that translocations, especially on KMT2A, can change (switch) the nature of the cancer between myeloid and lymphoid. This so-called lineage plasticity is attributed to the unusual clinical conditions (phenotypes) and difficulty in the diagnosis and treatment.

== History ==
The first possible case of MPAL was reported in 1906 by Leonard Findlay at the Glasgow Royal Infirmary. Describing the diagnosis and post-mortem study, Findlay noted that in addition to the lymphocytes there was "other variety, which is in a much smaller proportion, varies, like the myelocyte, much in shape and size." He reported:

In conclusion, then, there seems no doubt, not only from the condition of the blood during life but also from the pathological findings, that we are dealing here with a hyperplasia of both the myeloid and adenoid tissues.

The definitive cases came into light in 1980 after two separate reports, one from Western Infirmary, Glasgow, and the other from William N. Wishard Memorial Hospital (now the Sidney & Lois Eskenazi Hospital), Indianapolis. By 1981, the distinction was clearer when monoclonal antibodies were used to identify the cancer cells. Following three cases from St. Jude Children's Research Hospital, Tennessee, the name "acute leukaemia with mixed lymphoid and myeloid phenotype" was introduced. The World Health Organization in its WHO Classification of Tumors of Haematopoietic and Lymphoid Tissues (2008) adopted the name "mixed-phenotype acute leukemia" to include leukemias of ambiguous lineage, acute undifferentiated leukemias and natural killer lymphoblastic leukemias.
