= LIGPLOT =

- Developer: European Bioinformatics Institute
- Stable release: 4.5.3
- Operating system: Cross-platform
- Type: Molecular modelling
- Website: LIGPLOT home

In bioinformatics, LIGPLOT is a computer program that generates schematic 2-D representations of protein-ligand complexes from standard Protein Data Bank file input. The LIGPLOT is used to generate images for the PDBsum resource that summarises molecular structure.
