= Chronic eosinophilic leukemia =

- Other names: CEL
- Specialty: Hematology, oncology

Chronic eosinophilic leukemia is a form of cancer in which too many eosinophils are found in the bone marrow, blood, and other tissues. Most cases are associated with fusion genes.

== Signs and symptoms ==
Signs and symptoms may include weight loss, fever, malaise, cough, skin and mucosal lesions, diarrhea, and peripheral neuropathy. Cardiac symptoms are also possible.

In cases associated with PDGFRB and FGFR1 mutations, splenomegaly is common. Lymphadenopathy is also common with FGFR1 mutations.

Infiltration of eosinophils causes organ damage.

== Causes ==
Most cases of CEL are associated with rearrangements in PDGFRA, PDGFRB, or FGFR1.

CEL not otherwise specified (CEL NOS) is a form in which BCR-ABL1 fusion genes and PDGFRA, PDGFRB, and FGFR1 rearrangements are not found.

== Diagnosis ==
For a diagnosis of CEL, hypereosinophilia with greater than 30% eosinophils is required. Serum IgE is usually normal. In cases associated with PDGFRB, serum vitamin B12 and tryptase may be elevated.

== Prognosis ==
CEL associated with a mutation in PDGFRA is treatable with imatinib and has an excellent prognosis. On the other hand, CEL associated with FGFR1 mutations has a very poor prognosis. Progression can occur from CEL to AEL or AML in rare cases.

== Epidemiology ==
Cases occur in people of all ages. The disease is more common in males than in females.
