= Platelet-derived growth factor receptor A =

Human protein-coding gene

platelet-derived growth factor receptor alpha

Identifiers
- Aliases: PDGFRA, platelet-derived growth factor receptor alpha, platelet-derived growth factor receptor α, PDGFRα, CD140a, PDGFR 2, RHEPDGFRA
- External IDs: OMIM: 173490; MGI: 97530; GeneCards: PDGFRA
Available structures
PDB	Ortholog search: PDBe RCSB
PDB	List of PDB id codes 1GQ5
Enzyme activity
EC #	BRENDA	ExPASy	KEGG	MetaCyc
2.7.10.1	↗	↗	↗	↗

Gene location (Human)
Chr.	Chromosome 4 (human)
Band	4q12	Start	54,229,280 bp
Band	4q12	End	54,298,245 bp

Gene location (Mouse)
Chr.	Chromosome 5 (mouse)
Band	5 C3.3|5 39.55 cM	Start	75,312,953 bp
Band	5 C3.3|5 39.55 cM	End	75,358,876 bp
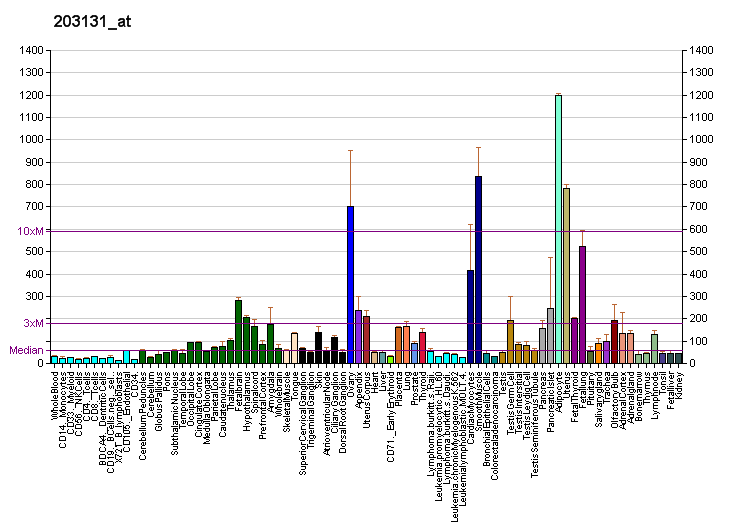
RNA expression pattern
Bgee	Human / Mouse (ortholog); Top expressed in: tibia; decidua; synovial joint; pericardium; lower lobe of lung; pylorus; stromal cell of endometrium; parietal pleura; caput epididymis; left ovary / Top expressed in: vas deferens; gastrula; efferent ductule; stroma of kidney; Gonadal ridge; vestibular sensory epithelium; dermis; molar; epithelium of lens; ankle; More reference expression data
BioGPS	More reference expression data
Gene ontology
Molecular function	vascular endothelial growth factor-activated receptor activity; transferase activity; protein kinase activity; nucleotide binding; protein homodimerization activity; vascular endothelial growth factor binding; platelet-derived growth factor receptor binding; kinase activity; protein binding; transmembrane receptor protein tyrosine kinase activity; platelet-derived growth factor alpha-receptor activity; protein tyrosine kinase activity; ATP binding; phosphatidylinositol-4,5-bisphosphate 3-kinase activity; protein-containing complex binding; platelet-derived growth factor binding
Cellular component	integral component of membrane; membrane; intrinsic component of plasma membrane; integral component of plasma membrane; plasma membrane; cell junction; nucleus; cytoplasm; microvillus; external side of plasma membrane; cell surface; Golgi apparatus; cilium; protein-containing complex; cell projection; receptor complex
Biological process	embryonic skeletal system morphogenesis; regulation of actin cytoskeleton reorganization; regulation of chemotaxis; phosphorylation; positive regulation of phospholipase C activity; transmembrane receptor protein tyrosine kinase signaling pathway; positive regulation of cell migration; positive regulation of fibroblast proliferation; positive regulation of cytosolic calcium ion concentration; cell activation; MAPK cascade; positive regulation of phosphatidylinositol 3-kinase activity; cellular response to reactive oxygen species; positive regulation of DNA replication; negative regulation of platelet activation; protein phosphorylation; chemotaxis; multicellular organism development; positive regulation of cell population proliferation; positive regulation of cell proliferation by VEGF-activated platelet derived growth factor receptor signaling pathway; positive regulation of ERK1 and ERK2 cascade; positive regulation of phosphatidylinositol 3-kinase signaling; platelet-derived growth factor receptor signaling pathway; viral process; platelet aggregation; regulation of mesenchymal stem cell differentiation; phosphatidylinositol phosphate biosynthetic process; negative regulation of platelet-derived growth factor receptor-beta signaling pathway; luteinization; in utero embryonic development; hematopoietic progenitor cell differentiation; estrogen metabolic process; female gonad development; anatomical structure morphogenesis; animal organ morphogenesis; cell migration; peptidyl-tyrosine phosphorylation; signal transduction involved in regulation of gene expression; extracellular matrix organization; lung development; adrenal gland development; male genitalia development; Leydig cell differentiation; platelet-derived growth factor receptor-alpha signaling pathway; wound healing; odontogenesis of dentin-containing tooth; protein autophosphorylation; embryonic digestive tract morphogenesis; embryonic cranial skeleton morphogenesis; skeletal system morphogenesis; cardiac myofibril assembly; roof of mouth development; face morphogenesis; cell chemotaxis; retina vasculature development in camera-type eye; cellular response to amino acid stimulus; metanephric glomerular capillary formation; phosphatidylinositol-mediated signaling; positive regulation of protein kinase B signaling; positive regulation of MAPK cascade
Sources:Amigo / QuickGO
Orthologs
Databases	NCBI: entry; OMA: entry
Species	Human	Mouse
Entrez	5156	18595
Ensembl	ENSG00000134853	ENSMUSG00000029231
UniProt	P16234	P26618
RefSeq (mRNA)	NM_006206; NM_001347827; NM_001347828; NM_001347829; NM_001347830	NM_001083316; NM_011058; NM_001347718; NM_001347719
RefSeq (protein)	NP_001334756; NP_001334757; NP_001334758; NP_001334759; NP_006197	NP_001076785; NP_001334647; NP_001334648; NP_035188
Location (UCSC)	Chr 4: 54.23 – 54.3 Mb	Chr 5: 75.31 – 75.36 Mb
PubMed search
- Wikidata
View/Edit Human	View/Edit Mouse

Platelet-derived growth factor receptor A, also termed CD140a, is a receptor located on the surface of a wide range of cell types. The protein is encoded in the human by the PDGFRA gene. This receptor binds to certain isoforms of platelet-derived growth factors (PDGFs) and thereby becomes active in stimulating cell signaling pathways that elicit responses such as cellular growth and differentiation. The receptor is critical for the embryonic development of certain tissues and organs, and for their maintenance, particularly hematologic tissues, throughout life. Mutations in PDGFRA, are associated with an array of clinically significant neoplasms, notably ones of the clonal hypereosinophilia class of malignancies, as well as gastrointestinal stromal tumors (GISTs).

== Overall structure ==
This gene encodes a typical receptor tyrosine kinase, which is a transmembrane protein consisting of an extracellular ligand binding domain, a transmembrane domain and an intracellular tyrosine kinase domain. The molecular mass of the mature, glycosylated PDGFRα protein is approximately 170 kDa. The protein is a cell surface tyrosine kinase receptor for members of the platelet-derived growth factor family.

== Modes of activation ==
Activation of PDGFRA requires de-repression of the receptor's kinase activity. The ligand for PDGFRα (PDGF) accomplishes this in the course of assembling a PDGFRα dimer. Four of the five PDGF isoforms activate PDGFRα (PDGF-A, PDGF-B, PDGF-AB and PDGF-C). The activated receptor phosphorylates itself and other proteins, and thereby engages intracellular signaling pathways that trigger cellular responses such as migration and proliferation.

There are also PDGF-independent modes of de-repressing the PDGFRα's kinase activity and hence activating it. For instance, forcing PDGFRα into close proximity of each other by overexpression or with antibodies directed against the extracellular domain. Alternatively, mutations in the kinase domain that stabilize a kinase active conformation result in constitutive activation. Finally, growth factors outside of the PDGF family (non-PDGFs) activate PDGFRα indirectly. Non-PDGFs bind to their own receptors that trigger intracellular events that de-repress the kinase activity of PDGFRα monomers. The intracellular events by which non-PDGFs indirectly activate PDGFRα include elevation of reactive oxygen species that activate Src family kinases, which phosphorylate PDGFRα.

The mode of activation determines the duration that PDGFRα remains active. The PDGF-mediated mode, which dimerized PDGFRα, accelerates internalization and degradation of activated PDGFRα such that the half-life of PDGF-activated PDGFRα is approximately 5 min. Enduring activation of PDGFRα (half-life greater than 120 min) occurs when PDGFRα monomers are activated.

== Role in physiology/pathology ==
The importance of PDGFRA during development is apparent from the observation that the majority of mice lacking a functional Pdgfra gene develop a plethora of embryonic defects, some of which are lethal; the mutant mice exhibit defects in kidney glomeruli because of a lack of mesangial cells but also suffer an ill-defined blood defect characterized by thrombocytopenic, a bleeding tendency, and severe anemia which could be due to blood loss. The mice die at or shortly before birth. PDGF-A and PDGF-C seem to be the important activators of PDGFRα during development because mice lacking functional genes for both these PDGFRA activating ligands, i.e. Pdgfa/Pdgfc- double null mice show similar defects to Pdgra null mice. Mice genetically engineered to express a constitutively (i.e. continuously) activated PDGFRα mutant receptor eventually develop fibrosis in the skin and multiple internal organs. The studies suggest that PDGFRA plays fundamental roles in the development and function of mesodermal tissues, e.g., blood cells, connective tissue, and mesangial cells.

== Clinical significance ==
=== PDGFRA mutations ===
==== Myeloid and lymphoid cells ====
Somatic mutations that cause the fusion of the PDGFRA gene with certain other genes occur in hematopoietic stem cells and cause a hematological malignancy in the clonal hypereosinophilia class of malignancies. These mutations create fused genes which encode chimeric proteins that possess continuously active PDGFRA-derived tyrosine kinase. They thereby continuously stimulate cell growth and proliferation and lead to the development of leukemias, lymphomas, and myelodysplastic syndromes that are commonly associated with hypereosinophilia and therefore regarded as a sub-type of clonal eosinophilia. In the most common of these mutations, the PDGFRA gene on human chromosome 4 at position q12 (notated as 4q12) fuses with the FIP1L1 gene also located at position 4q12. This interstitial (i.e. on the same chromosome) fusion creates a FIP1L1-PDGFRA fusion gene while usually losing intervening genetic material, typically including either the CHIC2 or LNX gene. The fused gene encodes a FIP1L1-PDGFRA protein that causes: a) chronic eosinophilia which progresses to chronic eosinophilic leukemia; b) a form of myeloproliferative neoplasm/myeloblastic leukemia associated with little or no eosinophilia; c) T-lymphoblastic leukemia/lymphoma associated with eosinophilia; d) myeloid sarcoma with eosinophilia (see FIP1L1-PDGFRA fusion genes); or e) mixtures of these presentations. Variations in the type of malignancy formed likely reflects the specific type(s) of hematopoietic stem cells that bear the mutation. The PDGFRA gene may also mutate through any one of several chromosome translocations to create fusion genes which, like the Fip1l1-PDGFRA fusion gene, encode a fusion protein that possesses continuously active PDGFRA-related tyrosine kinase and causes myeloid and/or lymphoid malignancies. These mutations, including the Fip1l1-PDGFRA mutation, along with the chromosomal location of PDGFRA's partner and the notation used to identify the fused gene are given in the following table.

Gene	locus	notation	gene	locus	notation	Gene	locus	notation	gene	locus	notation	gene	locus	notation
FIP1L1	4q12	t(4;4)(q12;q12)	KIF5B	10p11	t(4;11)(q12;p11)	CDK5RAP2	9q33	t(5;9)(q12;q33)	STRN	2p24	t(2;4)(q24-p12)	ETV6	12p13.2	(4;12)(q2?3;p1?2)
FOXP1	3p14	t(3;4)(q14;p12	TNKS2	10q23	t(4;10)(q12;q23)	BCR	22q11	t(4;22)(q12;q11)	JAK2	9p24	t(4;9)(q12-p24)			

Patients afflicted with any one of these translocation mutations, similar to those afflicted with the interstitial PDGFRA-FIP1l1 fusion gene: a) present with findings of chronic eosinophilia, hypereosinophilia, the hypereosinophilic syndrome, or chronic eosinophilic leukemia; myeloproliferative neoplasm/myeloblastic leukemia; a T-lymphoblastic leukemia/lymphoma; or myeloid sarcoma; b) are diagnosed cytogenetically, usually by analyses that detect breakpoints in the short arm of chromosome 4 using Fluorescence in situ hybridization; and c) where treated (many of the translocations are extremely rare and have not been fully tested for drug sensitivity), respond well or are anticipated to respond well to imatinib therapy as described for the treatment of diseases caused by FIP1L1-PDGFRA fusion genes.

==== Gastrointestinal tract ====
Activating mutations in PDGFRA are also involved in the development of 2–15% of gastrointestinal stromal tumors (GISTs), which is the most common mesenchymal neoplasm of the gastrointestinal tract. GIST tumors are sarcomas derived from the GI tract's connective tissue whereas most GI tract tumors are adenocarcinomas derived from the tract's epithelium cells. GIST tumors occur throughout the GI tract but most (66%) occur in the stomach and when developing there have a lower malignant potential than GIST tumors found elsewhere in the GI tract. The most common PDGFRA mutations found in GIST tumors occur in exon 18 and are thought to stabilize PDGFRA's tyrosine kinase in an activated conformation. A single mutation, D842V, in this exon accounts for >70% of GIST tumors. The next most common GIST tumor mutation occurs in exon 18, accounts for <1% of GISTs tumors, and is a deletion of codons 842 to 845. Exon 12 is the second most commonly mutated PDGFRA exon in GIST, being found in ~1% of GIST tumors. Mutations in PDGFRA's exon 14 are found in <1% of GIST tumors. While some PDGFRA mutation-induced GIST tumors are sensitive to the tyrosine kinase inhibitor, imatinib, the most common mutation, D842V, as well as some very rare mutations are resistant to this drug: median overall survival is reported to be only 12.8 months in patients whose tumors bear the D842V mutation compared to 48–60 months in large series of imatinib-treated patients with other types of GIST mutations. Consequently, it is critical to define the exact nature of PDGFR-induced mutant GIST tumors in order to select appropriate therapy particularly because a novel PDGFRA selective kinase inhibitor, crenolanib, is under investigation for treating D842V-induced and other imatinib-resistant GIST tumors. A randomized trial testing the efficacy of crenolanib in patients with GIST tumors bearing the D842V mutation is under recruitment.

Olaratumab (LY3012207) is a human IgG1 monoclonal antibody designed to bind to human PDGFRα with high affinity and block PDGF-AA, PDGF-BB, and PDGF-CC ligands from binding to the receptor. Numerous studies using it to treat soft tissue sarcomas including GIST are ongoing. Studies on GIST have focused on inoperable, metastatic, and/or recurrent disease and have tested olagatumab with Doxorubicin versus doxorubicin along. The US FDA granted approval for the use of olaratumab-dcoxorbicin therapy of soft tissue sarcomas under its Accelerated Approval Program based on the results of the phase II trial, (NCT01185964). In addition, the European Medicines Agency granted conditional approval for olaratumab in this indication in November 2016 following a review under the EMA's Accelerated Assessment Program.

=== Nervous system ===
Gain-of-function H3K27M mutations in protein histone H3 lead to inactivation of polycomb repressive complex 2 (PRC2) methyltransferase and result in global hypomethylation of H3K27me3 and transcriptional derepression of potential oncogenes. About 40% of these mutation are associated with gain of function or amplifications mutations in the PDGFRA gene in cases of pediatric diffuse Gliomas of the pons. It appears that the initial histone H3 mutations alone are insufficient but rather require cooperating secondary mutations such as PDGFRA-activating mutations or PDGFRA amplifications to develop this type of brain tumor. In a small non-randomized trial study, imatinib therapy in patients with glioblastoma selected on the basis of having imatinib-inhibitable tyrosine kinases in biopsy tissue caused marginal disease improvement compared to similar treatment of patients with unselected recurrent glioblastoma. This suggests that patient sub-populations with excessive PDGFRA-related or other tyrosine kinase-related over-activity might benefit from imatinib therapy. Several phase I and Phase II clinical glioma/glioblastoma studies have been conducted using imatinib but no decisive follow-up phase III studies have been reported.

== Interactions ==
PDGFRA has been shown to interact with:

- CRK,
- Caveolin 1,
- Cbl gene,
- PDGFC,
- PDGFR-β,
- PLCG1, and
- Sodium-hydrogen antiporter 3 regulator 1.

== See also ==
- Platelet-derived growth factor receptor
- Clonal eosinophilia
