= Imatinib =

Chemical compound

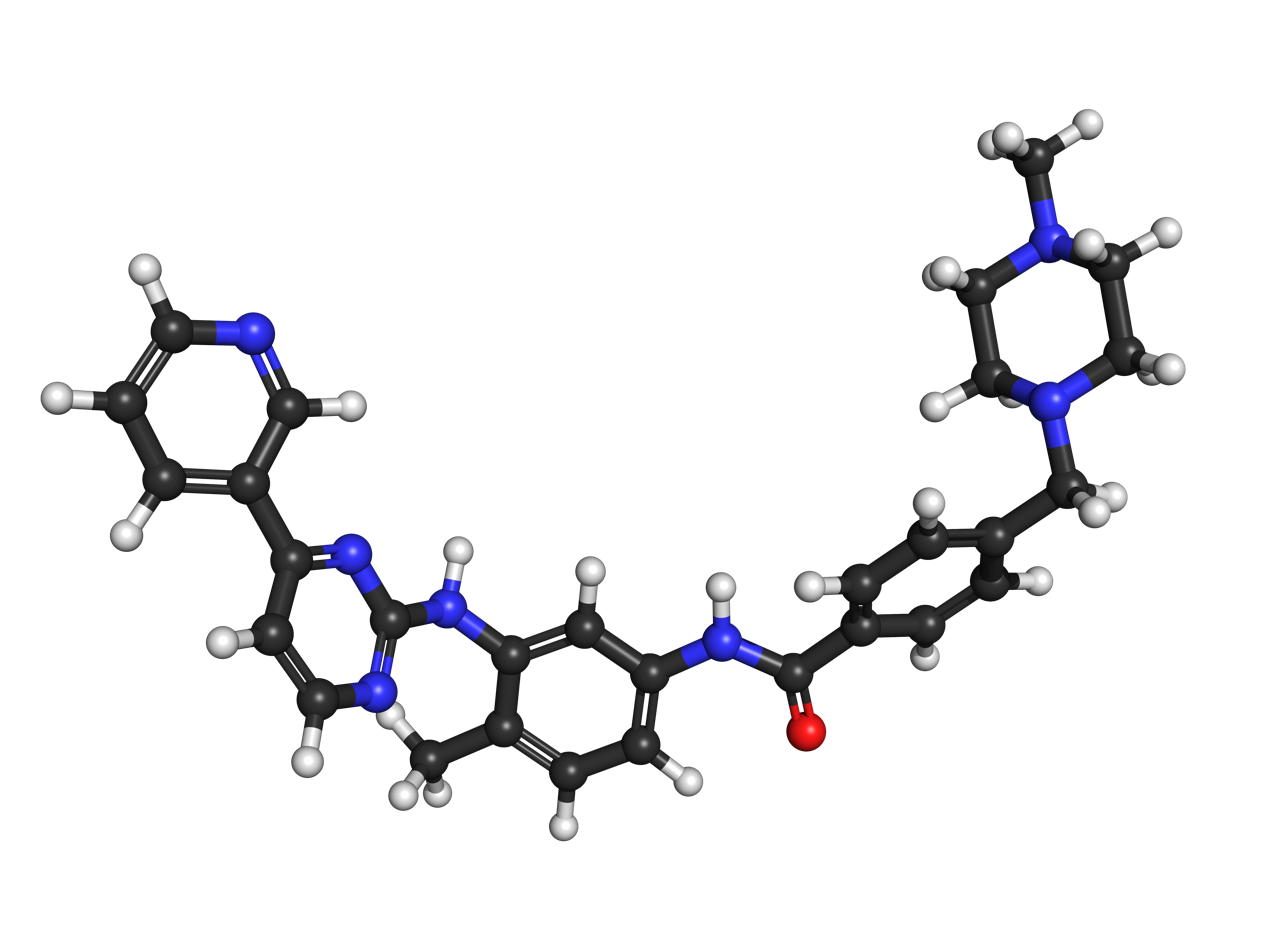

Clinical data
- Pronunciation: ih-MAT-ih-nib
- Trade names: Gleevec, Glivec, others
- Other names: STI-571
- AHFS/Drugs.com: Monograph
- MedlinePlus: a606018
- License data: US DailyMed: Imatinib
- Pregnancy category: AU: D
- Routes of administration: By mouth
- Drug class: Tyrosine kinase inhibitor
- ATC code: L01EA01 (WHO)

Legal status
- Legal status: AU: S4 (Prescription only); CA: ℞-only; UK: POM (Prescription only); US: ℞-only; EU: Rx-only

Pharmacokinetic data
- Bioavailability: 98%
- Protein binding: 95%
- Metabolism: Liver (mainly CYP3A4-mediated)
- Elimination half-life: 18 h (imatinib); 40 h (active metabolite)
- Excretion: Fecal (68%) and kidney (13%)

Identifiers
- IUPAC name: 4-[(4-methylpiperazin-1-yl)methyl]-N-(4-methyl-3-{[4-(pyridin-3-yl)pyrimidin-2-yl]amino}phenyl)benzamide
- CAS Number: 152459-95-5 220127-57-1 (mesilate)
- PubChem CID: 5291
- IUPHAR/BPS: 5687
- DrugBank: DB00619
- ChemSpider: 5101
- UNII: BKJ8M8G5HI
- KEGG: D08066
- ChEBI: CHEBI:45783
- ChEMBL: ChEMBL941
- PDB ligand: STI (PDBe, RCSB PDB)
- CompTox Dashboard (EPA): DTXSID3037125
- ECHA InfoCard: 100.122.739

Chemical and physical data
- Formula: C_{29}H_{31}N_{7}O
- Molar mass: 493.615 g·mol^{−1}
- 3D model (JSmol): Interactive image
- SMILES: Cc1ccc(cc1Nc2nccc(n2)c3cccnc3)NC(=O)c4ccc(cc4)CN5CCN(CC5)C
- InChI: InChI=1S/C29H31N7O/c1-21-5-10-25(18-27(21)34-29-31-13-11-26(33-29)24-4-3-12-30-19-24)32-28(37)23-8-6-22(7-9-23)20-36-16-14-35(2)15-17-36/h3-13,18-19H,14-17,20H2,1-2H3,(H,32,37)(H,31,33,34); Key:KTUFNOKKBVMGRW-UHFFFAOYSA-N

Imatinib, sold under the brand names Gleevec and Glivec (both marketed worldwide by Novartis) among others, is an oral targeted therapy medication used to treat cancer. Imatinib is a small molecule inhibitor targeting multiple tyrosine kinases such as CSF1R, ABL, c-KIT, FLT3, and PDGFR-β. Specifically, it is used for chronic myelogenous leukemia (CML) and acute lymphocytic leukemia (ALL) that are Philadelphia chromosome–positive (Ph^{+}), certain types of gastrointestinal stromal tumors (GIST), hypereosinophilic syndrome (HES), chronic eosinophilic leukemia (CEL), systemic mastocytosis, and myelodysplastic syndrome.

Common side effects include vomiting, diarrhea, muscle pain, headache, and rash. Severe side effects may include fluid retention, gastrointestinal bleeding, bone marrow suppression, liver problems, and heart failure. Use during pregnancy may result in harm to the baby. Imatinib works by stopping the Bcr-Abl tyrosine-kinase. This can slow growth or result in programmed cell death of certain types of cancer cells.

Imatinib was approved for medical use in the United States in 2001. It is on the World Health Organization's List of Essential Medicines. A generic version became available in the UK as of 2017.

== Medical uses ==
Imatinib is used to treat chronic myelogenous leukemia (CML), gastrointestinal stromal tumors (GISTs) and a number of other malignancies. In 2006 the FDA expanded approved use to include dermatofibrosarcoma protuberans (DFSP), myelodysplastic/myeloproliferative diseases (MDS/MPD), and aggressive systemic mastocytosis (ASM).

Imatinib is considered to be a very effective treatment for CML, and has been shown to improve outcomes for people with this type of leukemia. It can also be used to treat some types of ALL, but is not considered a standard of care for ALL. In many cases, imatinib can induce a complete cytogenetic response (CCyR) and major molecular response (MMR) and many patients can have a long-term remission. It is also used to maintain remission in chronic phase CML patients.

While imatinib is a very effective treatment for CML and some types of ALL, it is not a cure for leukemia. Instead, it is a 'chronic therapy' that helps to control the disease and prevent it from progressing. Some patients may need to continue taking imatinib for an extended period of time to maintain remission, and some patients may eventually require additional treatment options.

=== Chronic myelogenous leukemia ===
The U.S. Food and Drug Administration (FDA) has approved imatinib as first-line treatment for Philadelphia chromosome-positive CML, both in adults and children. The drug is approved in multiple contexts of Philadelphia chromosome-positive CML, including after stem cell transplant, in blast crisis, newly diagnosed, and accelerated phase.

Due in part to the development of imatinib and related drugs, the five-year survival rate for people with chronic myeloid leukemia increased from 31% in 1993, to 59% in 2009, to 70% in 2016. By 2023, the five year survival rate for people with chronic myeloid leukemia had risen to 90%. Starting from 2011, it became clear that CML patients who continue to respond to imatinib have the same or almost the same life expectancy as the general population.

=== Gastrointestinal stromal tumors ===
The FDA first granted approval for advanced GIST patients in 2002. On 1 February 2012, imatinib was approved for use after the surgical removal of KIT-positive tumors to help prevent recurrence. The drug is also approved in unresectable KIT-positive GISTs.

=== Dermatofibrosarcoma protuberans (DFSP) ===
The FDA granted approval for the treatment of dermatofibrosarcoma protuberans (DFSP) patients in 2006. Specifically adult patients with unresectable, recurrent and/or metastatic dermatofibrosarcoma protuberans (DFSP). Prior to approval DFSP was considered unresponsive to chemotherapy treatments.

=== Other ===
The FDA has approved imatinib for use in adults with relapsed or refractory Philadelphia chromosome-positive acute lymphoblastic leukemia (Ph+ ALL), myelodysplastic/myeloproliferative diseases associated with platelet-derived growth factor receptor gene rearrangements, aggressive systemic mastocytosis without or an unknown D816V c-KIT mutation, hypereosinophilic syndrome and/or chronic eosinophilic leukemia who have the FIP1L1-PDGFRα fusion kinase (CHIC2 allele deletion) or FIP1L1-PDGFRα fusion kinase negative or unknown, unresectable, recurrent and/or metastatic dermatofibrosarcoma protuberans. On 25 January 2013, Gleevec was approved for use in children with Ph+ ALL.

For treatment of progressive plexiform neurofibromas associated with neurofibromatosis type I, early research has shown potential for using the c-KIT tyrosine kinase blocking properties of imatinib. There have been several phase 2 trials of imatinib for aggressive fibromatosis.

== Contraindications and cautions ==
The only known contraindication to imatinib is hypersensitivity to imatinib. Cautions include:

- Hepatic impairment
- Risk of severe CHF or left ventricular dysfunction, especially in patients with comorbidities
- Pregnancy, risk of embryo-fetal toxicity
- Risk of fluid retention
- Risk of growth stunting in children or adolescents

== Side effects ==
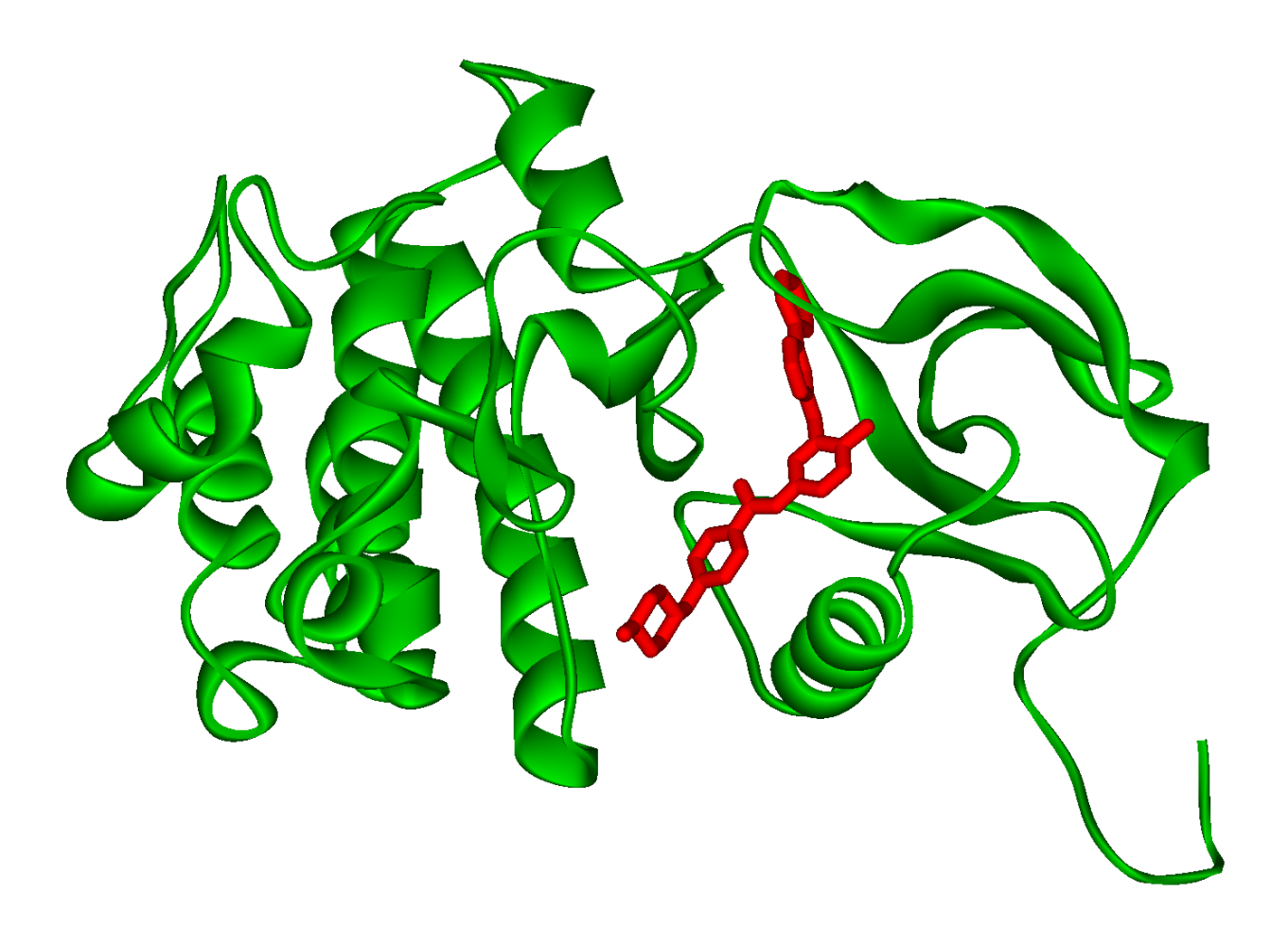
bcr-abl kinase (green), which causes CML, inhibited by imatinib (red; small molecule).

The most common side effects include nausea, vomiting, diarrhea, headaches, leg aches/cramps, fluid retention, visual disturbances, itchy rash, lowered resistance to infection, bruising or bleeding, loss of appetite, weight gain, reduced number of blood cells (neutropenia, thrombocytopenia, anemia), and edema.

=== Cardiotoxicity ===
In some individuals, imatinib use was reported to be associated with left ventricular dysfunction which sometimes progressed to congestive cardiac failure despite an absence of prior heart disease. Clinical trials of imatinib did not report cardiac adverse effects, but had reported a notably high incidence of peripheral oedema (edema), with some cases classified as severe.

Patient biopsies as well as mice treated with large doses of imatinib exhibited cellular signs of cardiotoxicity. Studies determined a potential pathway that led to cardiotoxicity, stemming from a stress response within the endoplasmic reticulum and the effects of c-ABL inhibition. Cardiotoxic effects appeared to mediated by inhibition of cytoplasmic ABL1 tyrosine kinase.

=== Childhood growth inhibition ===
Multiple human and animal studies suggest that if imatinib is used in prepubescent children, it may delay normal growth (more specifically bone elongation), although some may experience at least partial catch-up growth during puberty.

The reason for this side effect is unclear; interference with a growth hormone (GH)-related pathway may be involved (prepubertal growth is GH-dependent, whereas pubertal growth is synergystically promoted by both GH and sex hormones).

=== Pigmentation changes ===
Imatinib use may cause lightening/depigmentation or darkening/repigmentation of hair (as is the case with some other tyrosine kinase inhibitors) and/or skin as well as hyperpigmentation of the gingiva. The median onset of hair color change is 4 weeks after initiation of therapy (but may occur over a year after initiation), is dose-dependent, and is reversible upon treatment discontinuation or dose reduction.

C-kit receptors - one of the biological target of imatinib - are expressed by melanocytes.

=== Hepatotoxicity ===
Both mild and severe hepatotoxicity can occur. 5% of patients developed mild hepatotoxicity within the first 2 years of beginning treatment. However, severe hepatotoxicity is rare. Both severe and mild hepatotoxicity can be reversed by either stopping treatment or reducing the dosage of imatinib.

== Overdose ==
Medical experience with imatinib overdose is limited. Treatment is supportive. Imatinib is highly plasma protein-bound: dialysis is unlikely to be helpful removing imatinib.

== Interactions ==
Its use is advised against in people on strong CYP3A4 inhibitors such as clarithromycin, chloramphenicol, ketoconazole, ritonavir and nefazodone due to its reliance on CYP3A4 for metabolism. Likewise it is a CYP3A4, CYP2D6 and CYP2C9 inhibitor and hence concurrent treatment with substrates of any of these enzymes may increase plasma concentrations of said drugs. Since imatinib is mainly metabolised via the liver enzyme CYP3A4, substances influencing the activity of this enzyme change the plasma concentration of the drug. An example of a drug that increases imatinib activity and therefore side effects by blocking CYP3A4 is ketoconazole. The same could be true of itraconazole, clarithromycin, grapefruit juice, among others. Conversely, CYP3A4 inductors like rifampicin and St John's Wort reduce the drug's activity, risking therapy failure. Imatinib also acts as an inhibitor of CYP3A4, 2C9 and 2D6, increasing the plasma concentrations of a number of other drugs like simvastatin, ciclosporin, pimozide, warfarin, metoprolol, and possibly paracetamol. The drug also reduces plasma levels of levothyroxin via an unknown mechanism.

As with other immunosuppressants, application of live vaccines is contraindicated because the microorganisms in the vaccine could multiply and infect the patient. Inactivated and toxoid vaccines do not hold this risk, but may not be effective under imatinib therapy.

Eating grapefruit and drinking grapefruit juice are strongly discouraged as it increases the concentration of imatinib in the blood.

== Pharmacology ==
=== Mechanism of action ===
Mechanism of action of imatinib

Imatinib
- Drug mechanism
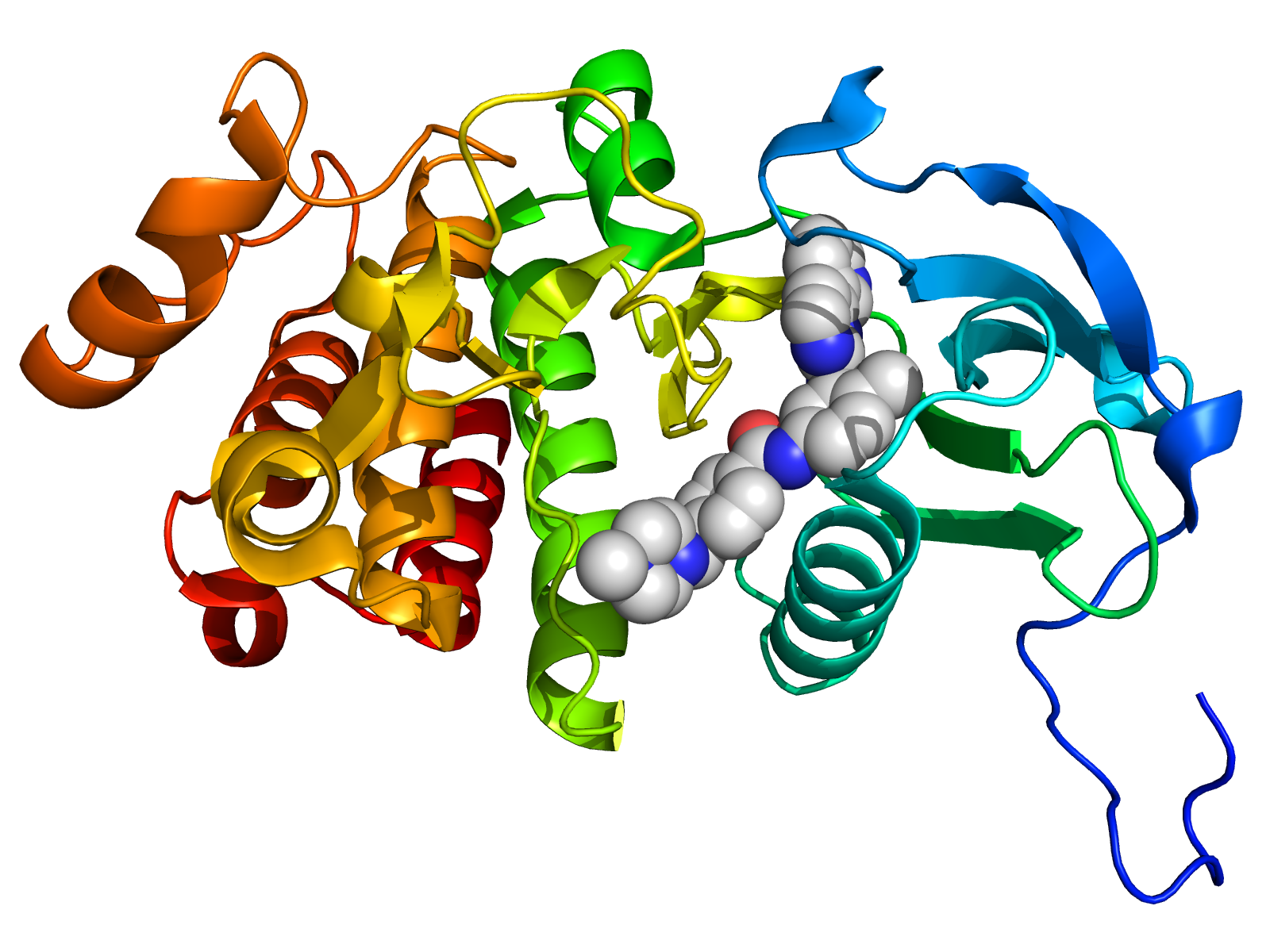
- Crystallographic structure of tyrosine-protein kinase ABL (rainbow colored, N-terminus = blue, C-terminus = red) complexed with imatinib (spheres, carbon = white, oxygen = red, nitrogen = blue).
- Therapeutic use: chronic myelogenous leukemia
- Biological target: ABL, c-kit, PDGF-R
- Mechanism of action: Tyrosine-kinase inhibitor

External links
- ATC code: L01XE01
- PDB ligand id: STI: PDBe, RCSB PDB
- LIGPLOT: 1iep

Imatinib is a 2-phenyl amino pyrimidine derivative that functions as a specific inhibitor of a number of tyrosine kinase enzymes. It occupies the TK active site, leading to a decrease in activity.

There are a large number of TK enzymes in the body, including the insulin receptor. Imatinib is specific for the TK domain in abl (the Abelson proto-oncogene), c-kit and PDGF-R (platelet-derived growth factor receptor).

In chronic myelogenous leukemia, the Philadelphia chromosome leads to a fusion protein of abl with bcr (breakpoint cluster region), termed bcr-abl. As this is now a constitutively active tyrosine kinase, imatinib is used to decrease bcr-abl activity.

The active sites of tyrosine kinases each have a binding site for ATP. The enzymatic activity catalyzed by a tyrosine kinase is the transfer of the terminal phosphate from ATP to tyrosine residues on its substrates, a process known as protein tyrosine phosphorylation. Imatinib works by binding close to the ATP binding site of bcr-abl, locking it in a closed or self-inhibited conformation, and therefore inhibiting the enzyme activity of the protein semi-competitively. This fact explains why many BCR-ABL mutations can cause resistance to imatinib by shifting its equilibrium toward the open or active conformation.

Imatinib is quite selective for bcr-abl, though it does also inhibit other targets mentioned above (c-kit and PDGF-R), as well as ABL2 (ARG) and DDR1 tyrosine kinases and NQO2 – an oxidoreductase. Imatinib also inhibits the abl protein of non-cancer cells, but these cells normally have additional redundant tyrosine kinases, which allows them to continue to function even if abl tyrosine kinase is inhibited. Some tumor cells, however, have a dependence on bcr-abl. Inhibition of the bcr-abl tyrosine kinase also stimulates its entry in to the nucleus, where it is unable to perform any of its normal anti-apoptotic functions, leading to tumor cell death.

==== Other pathways affected ====
The Bcr-Abl pathway has many downstream pathways including

- the Ras/MapK pathway, which leads to increased proliferation due to increased growth factor-independent cell growth.
- It also affects the Src/Pax/Fak/Rac pathway. This affects the cytoskeleton, which leads to increased cell motility and decreased adhesion.
- The PI/PI3K/AKT/BCL-2 pathway is also affected. BCL-2 is responsible for keeping the mitochondria stable; this suppresses cell death by apoptosis and increases survival.
- The last pathway that Bcr-Abl affects is the JAK/STAT pathway, which is responsible for proliferation.

=== Pharmacokinetics ===
Imatinib is rapidly absorbed when given by mouth, and is highly bioavailable: 98% of an oral dose reaches the bloodstream. Metabolism of imatinib occurs in the liver and is mediated by several isozymes of the cytochrome P450 system, including CYP3A4 and, to a lesser extent, CYP1A2, CYP2D6, CYP2C9, and CYP2C19. The main metabolite, N-demethylated piperazine derivative, is also active. The major route of elimination is in the bile and feces; only a small portion of the drug is excreted in the urine. Most of imatinib is eliminated as metabolites; only 25% is eliminated unchanged. The half-lives of imatinib and its main metabolite are 18 h and 40 h, respectively. It blocks the activity of Abelson cytoplasmic tyrosine kinase (ABL), c-Kit and the platelet-derived growth factor receptor (PDGFR). As an inhibitor of PDGFR, imatinib mesylate appears to have utility in the treatment of a variety of dermatological diseases. Imatinib has been reported to be an effective treatment for FIP1L1-PDGFRalpha+ mast cell disease, hypereosinophilic syndrome, and dermatofibrosarcoma protuberans.

== History ==
Imatinib was invented in the early 1990s (the first patent application took place in 1994) by scientists at Ciba-Geigy (which merged with Sandoz in 1996 to become Novartis), in a team led by the British biochemist Nicholas Lydon and that included Elisabeth Buchdunger and Jürg Zimmermann, and its use to treat CML was driven by oncologist Brian Druker of Oregon Health & Science University (OHSU). Other major contributions to imatinib development were made by biologist Anthony R. Hunter at Salk Institute for Biological Studies in La Jolla, California, Carlo Gambacorti-Passerini, a physician, scientist, and hematologist at the University of Milano Bicocca, Italy, John Goldman at Hammersmith Hospital in London, and later on by Charles Sawyers of Memorial Sloan Kettering Cancer Center in New York.

Imatinib was developed by rational drug design. After the Philadelphia chromosome mutation and hyperactive bcr-abl protein were discovered, the investigators screened chemical libraries to find a drug that would inhibit that protein. With high-throughput screening, they identified 2-phenylaminopyrimidine. This lead compound was then tested and modified by the introduction of methyl and benzamide groups to give it enhanced binding properties, resulting in imatinib.

When Novartis tested imatinib in rats, mice, rabbits, dogs, and monkeys in 1996, it was found to have several toxic effects; in particular, results indicating liver damage in dogs nearly stopped drug development completely. However, favorable results in studies with monkeys and in vitro human cells allowed testing to continue in humans.

The first clinical trial of Gleevec took place in 1998, after Novartis reluctantly synthesized and released a few grams of the drug for Druker, enough for him to run a trial using a hundred or so patients. Mel Mann, who entered the clinical trial in August 1998, is the longest living person to be treated with the drug. The drug received FDA approval in May 2001, only two and a half years after the new drug application was submitted. On the same month it made the cover of TIME magazine as a "bullet" to be used against cancer. Druker, Lydon and Sawyers received the Lasker-DeBakey Clinical Medical Research Award in 2009 for "converting a fatal cancer into a manageable chronic condition".

During the FDA review, the tradename of the drug for the US market was changed from "Glivec" to "Gleevec" at the request of the FDA, to avoid confusion with Glyset, a diabetes drug.

A Swiss patent application was filed on imatinib and various salts on in April 1992, which was then filed in the EU, the US, and other countries in March and April 1993. and in 1996 United States and European patent offices issued patents listing Jürg Zimmermann as the inventor.

In July 1997, Novartis filed a new patent application in Switzerland on the beta crystalline form of imatinib mesylate (the mesylate salt of imatinib). The "beta crystalline form" of the molecule is a specific polymorph of imatinib mesylate; a specific way that the individual molecules pack together to form a solid. This is the actual form of the drug sold as Gleevec/Glivec; a salt (imatinib mesylate) as opposed to a free base, and the beta crystalline form as opposed to the alpha or other form. In 1998, Novartis filed international patent applications claiming priority to the 1997 filing. A United States patent was granted in 2005.

== Society and culture ==
=== Economics ===
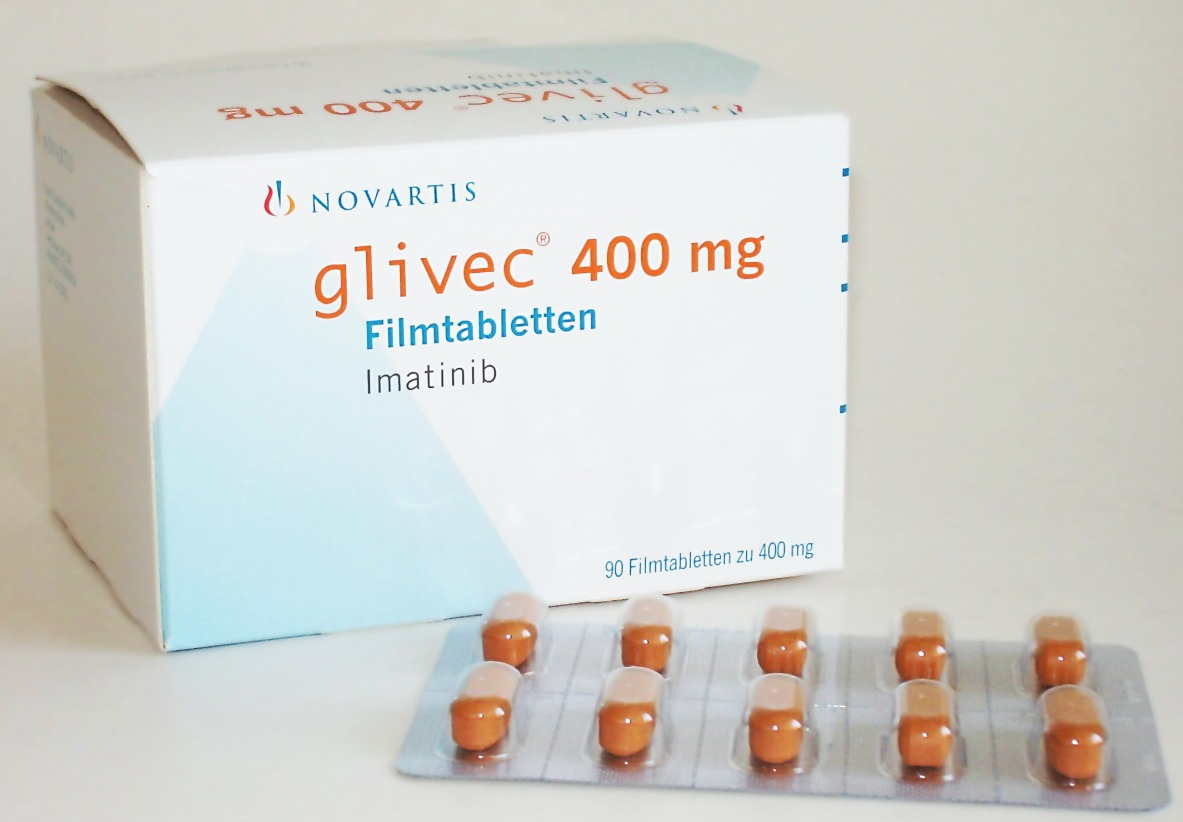
A box of 400-milligram Glivec tablets (Novartis), as sold in Germany.

In 2013, more than 100 cancer specialists published a letter in Blood saying that the prices of many new cancer drugs, including imatinib, are so high that people in the United States could not afford them, and that the level of prices, and profits, was so high as to be immoral. Signatories of the letter included Brian Druker, Carlo Gambacorti-Passerini, and John Goldman, developers of imatinib. They wrote that in 2001, imatinib was priced at $30,000 (equivalent to $54,548 in 2025) a year, which was based on the price of interferon, then the standard treatment, and that at this price Novartis would have recouped its initial development costs in two years. They wrote that after unexpectedly becoming a blockbuster, Novartis increased the price to $92,000 (equivalent to $129,019 in 2025) per year in 2012, with annual revenues of $4.7 billion. Other physicians have complained about the cost.

Druker, who led the clinical studies, never received any royalties or profits from the success of the drug.

By 2016, the average wholesale price had increased to $120,000 (equivalent to $160,982 in 2025) a year, according to an analysis prepared for The Washington Post by Stacie Dusetzina of the University of North Carolina at Chapel Hill. When competitive drugs came on the market, they were sold at a higher price to reflect the smaller population, and Novartis raised the price of Gleevec to match them.

A 2012 economic analysis funded by Bristol-Myers Squibb estimated that the discovery and development of imatinib and related drugs had created $143 billion in societal value at a cost to consumers of approximately $14 billion. The $143 billion figure was based on an estimated 7.5 to 17.5 year survival advantage conferred by imatinib treatment, and included the value (discounted at 3% per annum) of ongoing benefits to society after the imatinib patent expiration.

Prices for a 100 mg pill of Gleevec internationally range from $20 to $30, although generic imatinib is cheaper, as low as $2 per pill.

=== Controversies ===
==== Patent litigation in India ====
Novartis fought a seven-year, controversial battle to patent Gleevec in India, and took the case all the way to the Indian Supreme Court. The patent application at the center of the case was filed by Novartis in India in 1998, after India had agreed to enter the World Trade Organization and to abide by worldwide intellectual property standards under the TRIPS agreement. As part of this agreement, India made changes to its patent law, the biggest of which was that prior to these changes, patents on products were not allowed, while afterwards they were, albeit with restrictions. These changes came into effect in 2005, so Novartis' patent application waited in a "mailbox" with others until then, under procedures that India instituted to manage the transition. India also passed certain amendments to its patent law in 2005, just before the laws came into effect.

The patent application claimed the final form of Gleevec (the beta crystalline form of imatinib mesylate). In 1993, during the time India did not allow patents on products, Novartis had patented imatinib, with salts vaguely specified, in many countries but could not patent it in India. The key differences between the two patent applications, were that 1998 patent application specified the counterion (Gleevec is a specific salt – imatinib mesylate) while the 1993 patent application did not claim any specific salts nor did it mention mesylate, and the 1998 patent application specified the solid form of Gleevec – the way the individual molecules are packed together into a solid when the drug itself is manufactured (this is separate from processes by which the drug itself is formulated into pills or capsules) – while the 1993 patent application did not. The solid form of imatinib mesylate in Gleevec is beta crystalline.

As provided under the TRIPS agreement, Novartis applied for Exclusive Marketing Rights (EMR) for Gleevec from the Indian Patent Office and the EMR was granted in November 2003. Novartis made use of the EMR to obtain orders against some generic manufacturers who had already launched Gleevec in India.

When examination of Novartis' patent application began in 2005, it came under immediate attack from oppositions initiated by generic companies that were already selling Gleevec in India and by advocacy groups. The application was rejected by the patent office and by an appeal board. The key basis for the rejection was the part of Indian patent law that was created by amendment in 2005, describing the patentability of new uses for known drugs and modifications of known drugs. That section, 3d, specified that such inventions are patentable only if "they differ significantly in properties with regard to efficacy." At one point, Novartis went to court to try to invalidate Section 3d; it argued that the provision was unconstitutionally vague and that it violated TRIPS. Novartis lost that case and did not appeal. Novartis did appeal the rejection by the patent office to India's Supreme Court, which took the case.

The Supreme Court case hinged on the interpretation of Section 3d. The Supreme Court issued its decision in 2013, ruling that the substance that Novartis sought to patent was indeed a modification of a known drug (the raw form of imatinib, which was publicly disclosed in the 1993 patent application and in scientific articles), that Novartis did not present evidence of a difference in therapeutic efficacy between the final form of Gleevec and the raw form of imatinib, and that therefore the patent application was properly rejected by the patent office and lower courts.

== Research ==
One study demonstrated that imatinib mesylate was effective in patients with systemic mastocytosis, including those who had the D816V mutation in c-KIT. However, since imatinib binds to tyrosine kinases when they are in the inactive configuration and the D816V mutant of c-KIT is constitutively active, imatinib does not inhibit the kinase activity of the D816V mutant of c-KIT. Experience has shown, however, that imatinib is much less effective in patients with this mutation, and patients with the mutation comprise nearly 90% of cases of mastocytosis.

Imatinib was initially thought to have a potential role in the treatment of pulmonary hypertension. It was shown to reduce both the smooth muscle hypertrophy and hyperplasia of the pulmonary vasculature in a variety of disease processes, including portopulmonary hypertension. However, a long-term trial of Imatinib in people with pulmonary arterial hypertension was unsuccessful, and serious and unexpected adverse events were frequent. These included 6 subdural hematomas and 17 deaths during or within 30 days of study end.

In systemic sclerosis, the drug has been tested for potential use in slowing down pulmonary fibrosis. In laboratory settings, imatinib is being used as an experimental agent to suppress platelet-derived growth factor (PDGF) by inhibiting its receptor (PDGF-Rβ). One of its effects is delaying atherosclerosis in mice without or with diabetes.

Mouse animal studies have suggested that imatinib and related drugs may be useful in treating smallpox, should an outbreak ever occur.

In vitro studies identified that a modified version of imatinib can bind to gamma-secretase activating protein (GSAP). GSAP selectively increases the production and accumulation of neurotoxic beta-amyloid plaques, which suggests that molecules which target GSAP and are able to cross blood–brain barrier are potential therapeutic agents for treating Alzheimer's disease. Another study suggests that imatinib may not need to cross the blood–brain barrier to be effective at treating Alzheimer's, as the research indicates the production of beta-amyloid may begin in the liver. Tests on mice indicate that imatinib is effective at reducing beta-amyloid in the brain. It is not known whether reduction of beta-amyloid is a feasible way of treating Alzheimer's, as an anti-beta-amyloid vaccine has been shown to clear the brain of plaques without having any effect on Alzheimer symptoms.

A formulation of imatinib with a cyclodextrin (Captisol) as a carrier to overcome the blood–brain barrier has shown reversal of opioid tolerance in a 2012 study in rats.

Imatinib is an experimental drug in the treatment of desmoid tumor or aggressive fibromatosis.

Imatinib has also been investigated as a potential therapy for Duchenne-Meryon muscular dystrophy. In early mdx mouse research, imatinib was shown to decrease inflammation, muscle necrosis, and fibrosis while increasing grip strength.

== Etymology ==
The -tinib word stem makes reference to the drug's action as a tyrosine kinase (TYK) inhibitor.
