= Interleukin 5 =

Type of cytokine

IL5
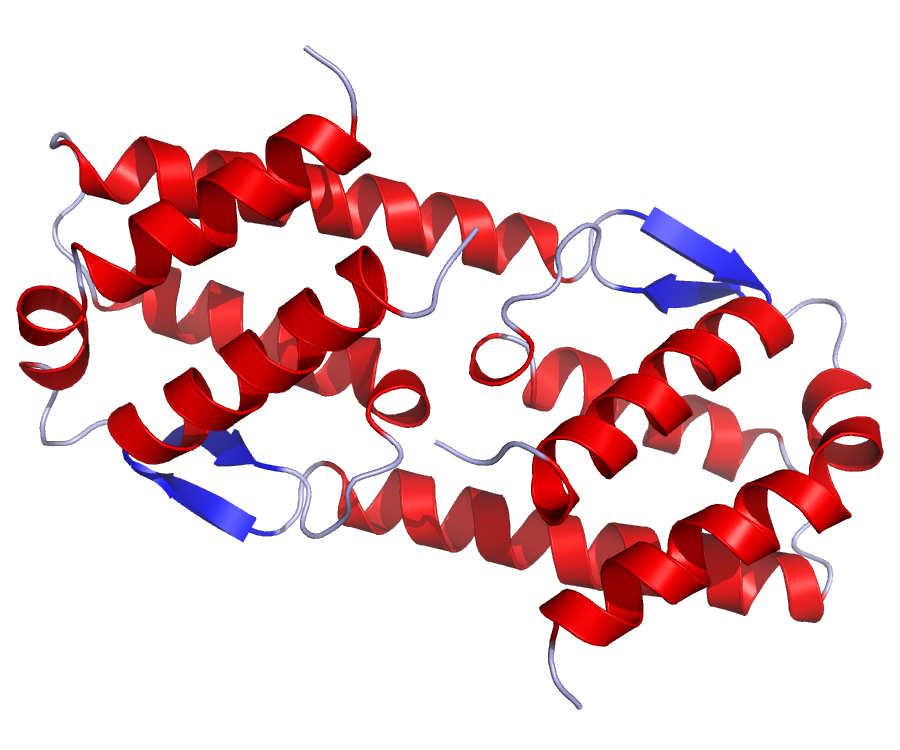

Identifiers
- Aliases: IL5, EDF, IL-5, TRF, interleukin 5
- External IDs: OMIM: 147850; MGI: 96557; GeneCards: IL5
Available structures
PDB	Ortholog search: PDBe RCSB
PDB	List of PDB id codes 3VA2, 1HUL, 3QT2

Gene location (Human)
Chr.	Chromosome 5 (human)
Band	5q31.1	Start	132,541,445 bp
Band	5q31.1	End	132,556,838 bp

Gene location (Mouse)
Chr.	Chromosome 11 (mouse)
Band	11 B1.3|11 31.99 cM	Start	53,611,621 bp
Band	11 B1.3|11 31.99 cM	End	53,615,933 bp
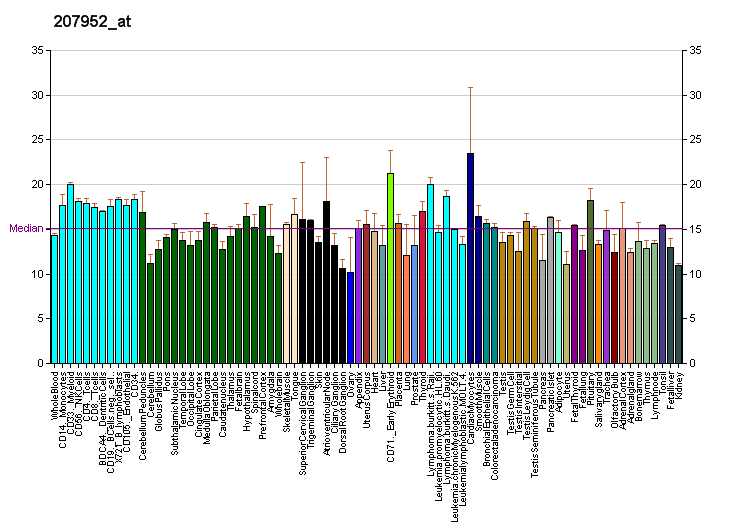
RNA expression pattern
Bgee	Human / Mouse (ortholog); Top expressed in: right testis; left testis; Achilles tendon; right uterine tube; corpus callosum; smooth muscle tissue; granulocyte; right ovary; right coronary artery; metanephros / Top expressed in: embryo; perirhinal cortex; esophagus; entorhinal cortex; CA3 field; medulla oblongata; thymus; primary motor cortex; More reference expression data
BioGPS	More reference expression data
Gene ontology
Molecular function	interleukin-5 receptor binding; protein binding; growth factor activity; protein tyrosine kinase activity; cytokine activity
Cellular component	extracellular region; intracellular anatomical structure; extracellular space
Biological process	positive regulation of DNA-binding transcription factor activity; positive regulation of podosome assembly; MAPK cascade; positive regulation of transcription, DNA-templated; immune response; positive regulation of cell population proliferation; positive regulation of eosinophil differentiation; positive regulation of peptidyl-tyrosine phosphorylation; inflammatory response; positive regulation of receptor signaling pathway via JAK-STAT; peptidyl-tyrosine phosphorylation; positive regulation of B cell proliferation; regulation of signaling receptor activity; cytokine-mediated signaling pathway
Sources:Amigo / QuickGO
Orthologs
Databases	NCBI: entry; OMA: entry
Species	Human	Mouse
Entrez	3567	16191
Ensembl	ENSG00000113525	ENSMUSG00000036117
UniProt	P05113	P04401
RefSeq (mRNA)	NM_000879	NM_010558
RefSeq (protein)	NP_000870	NP_034688
Location (UCSC)	Chr 5: 132.54 – 132.56 Mb	Chr 11: 53.61 – 53.62 Mb
PubMed search
- Wikidata
View/Edit Human	View/Edit Mouse

Interleukin 5 (IL-5) is an interleukin produced by type-2 T helper cells and mast cells.

== Function ==
Through binding to the interleukin-5 receptor, interleukin 5 stimulates B cell growth and increases immunoglobulin secretion—primarily IgA. It is also a key mediator in eosinophil activation.

== Structure ==
IL-5 is a 115-amino acid (in human, 133 in the mouse) -long T_{h}2 cytokine that is part of the hematopoietic family. Unlike other members of this cytokine family (namely interleukin 3 and GM-CSF), this glycoprotein in its active form is a homodimer.

== Tissue expression ==
The IL-5 gene is located on chromosome 11 in the mouse, and chromosome 5 in humans, in close proximity to the genes encoding IL-3, IL-4, and granulocyte-macrophage colony-stimulating factor (GM-CSF), which are often co-expressed in T_{h}2 cells. IL-5 is also expressed by eosinophils and has been observed in the mast cells of asthmatic airways by immunohistochemistry. IL-5 expression is regulated by several transcription factors including GATA3.

== Clinical significance ==
IL-5 has long been associated with the cause of several allergic diseases including allergic rhinitis and asthma, wherein a large increase in the number of circulating, airway tissue, and induced sputum eosinophils have been observed. Given the high concordance of eosinophils and, in particular, allergic asthma pathology, it has been widely speculated that eosinophils have an important role in the pathology of this disease.

As of 2019, there are two FDA-approved monoclonal antibodies that inhibit IL-5, mepolizumab and reslizumab. Additionally, the antibody benralizumab blocks the interleukin-5 receptor. All three drugs are used to treat severe eosinophilic asthma and eosinophilic granulomatosis with polyangiitis (EGPA). Another antibody, depemokimab (GSK3511294), ultra-long acting IL-5 inhibitor, is under development.

Some hydroxyethylaminomethylbenzimidazole analogs have shown IL-5 inhibition in vitro.

== Effect on eosinophils ==
Eosinophils are terminally differentiated granulocytes found in most mammals. The principal role of these cells, in a healthy host, is the elimination of antibody bound parasites through the release of cytotoxic granule proteins. Given that eosinophils are the primary IL-5Rα-expressing cells, it is not surprising that this cell type responds to IL-5. In fact, IL-5 was originally discovered as an eosinophil colony-stimulating factor, is a major regulator of eosinophil accumulation in tissues, and can modulate eosinophil behavior at every stage from maturation to survival. Mepolizumab is a monoclonal antibody antagonist IL-5 which can reduce excessive eosinophilia.

In Hodgkin lymphoma, the typically observed eosinophilia is thought to be attributable to an increased production of IL-5.

== Interactions ==
IL-5 has been shown to interact with interleukin 5 receptor alpha subunit.

== Receptors ==
The IL-5 receptor is composed of an α and a βc chain. The α subunit is specific for the IL-5 molecule, whereas the βc subunit also recognised by interleukin 3 (IL-3) and granulocyte-macrophage colony-stimulating factor (GM-CSF). Glycosylation of the Asn196 residue of the Rα subunit appears to be essential for binding of IL-5.
