= Interleukin 5 receptor alpha subunit =

Protein-coding gene in the species Homo sapiens

IL5RA
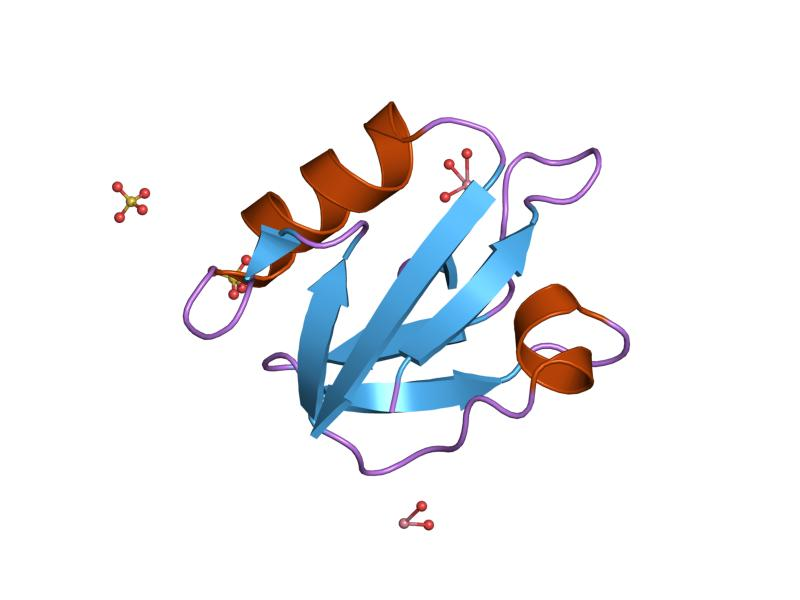

Identifiers
- Aliases: IL5RA, CD125, CDw125, HSIL5R3, IL5R, Interleukin 5 receptor alpha subunit, interleukin 5 receptor subunit alpha
- External IDs: OMIM: 147851; MGI: 96558; GeneCards: IL5RA
Available structures
PDB	Ortholog search: PDBe RCSB
PDB	List of PDB id codes 1OBX, 1OBZ, 3QT2, 3VA2

Gene location (Human)
Chr.	Chromosome 3 (human)
Band	3p26.2	Start	3,066,324 bp
Band	3p26.2	End	3,126,613 bp

Gene location (Mouse)
Chr.	Chromosome 6 (mouse)
Band	6 E1|6 49.19 cM	Start	106,687,318 bp
Band	6 E1|6 49.19 cM	End	106,725,998 bp
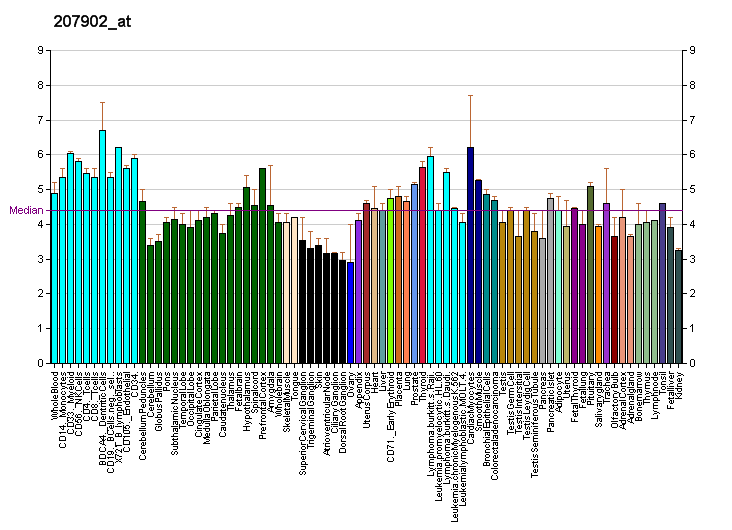

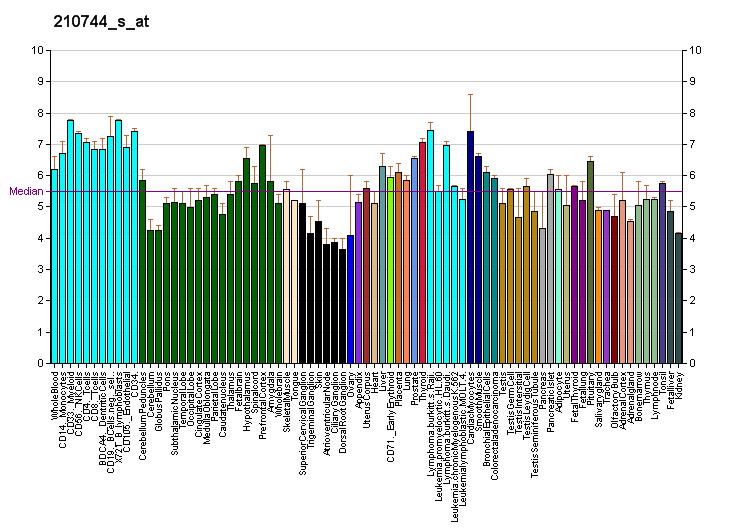

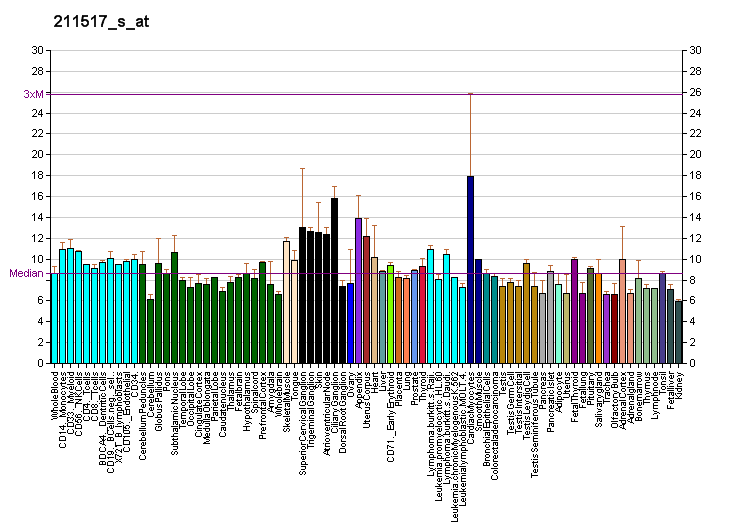
RNA expression pattern
Bgee	Human / Mouse (ortholog); Top expressed in: right uterine tube; olfactory zone of nasal mucosa; bronchial epithelial cell; gonad; bone marrow; blood; bone marrow cell; rectum; gallbladder; monocyte / Top expressed in: right kidney; blood; proximal tubule; mesenteric lymph nodes; morula; spleen; human kidney; thymus; uterus; CA3 field; More reference expression data
BioGPS	More reference expression data
Gene ontology
Molecular function	interleukin-5 receptor activity; protein binding; cytokine receptor activity; protein tyrosine kinase activity; cytokine binding
Cellular component	integral component of membrane; membrane; plasma membrane; intracellular anatomical structure; extracellular space; external side of plasma membrane; receptor complex
Biological process	cellular response to organic substance; inflammatory response to antigenic stimulus; regulation of interleukin-5 production; MAPK cascade; cell population proliferation; signal transduction; interleukin-5-mediated signaling pathway; peptidyl-tyrosine phosphorylation; cytokine-mediated signaling pathway; positive regulation of leukocyte proliferation
Sources:Amigo / QuickGO
Orthologs
Databases	NCBI: entry; OMA: entry
Species	Human	Mouse
Entrez	3568	16192
Ensembl	ENSG00000091181	ENSMUSG00000005364
UniProt	Q01344	P21183
RefSeq (mRNA)	NM_000564; NM_001243099; NM_175724; NM_175725; NM_175726 NM_175727; NM_175728	NM_008370
RefSeq (protein)	NP_000555; NP_001230028; NP_783851; NP_783852; NP_783853 NP_783854; NP_783855	NP_032396
Location (UCSC)	Chr 3: 3.07 – 3.13 Mb	Chr 6: 106.69 – 106.73 Mb
PubMed search
- Wikidata
View/Edit Human	View/Edit Mouse

Interleukin 5 receptor, alpha (IL5RA) also known as CD125 (Cluster of Differentiation 125) is a subunit of the Interleukin-5 receptor. IL5RA also denotes its human gene.

== Function ==
The protein encoded by this gene is an interleukin 5 specific subunit of a heterodimeric cytokine receptor. The receptor is composed of a ligand specific alpha subunit and a signal transducing beta subunit shared by the receptors for interleukin 3 (IL3), colony stimulating factor 2 (CSF2/GM-CSF), and interleukin 5 (IL5). The binding of this protein to IL5 depends on the beta subunit. The beta subunit is activated by the ligand binding, and is required for the biological activities of IL5. This protein has been found to interact with syndecan binding protein (syntenin), which is required for IL5 mediated activation of the transcription factor SOX4. Six alternatively spliced transcript variants encoding three distinct isoforms have been reported.

== Interactions ==
Interleukin 5 receptor alpha subunit has been shown to interact with:

- Interleukin 5,
- Janus kinase 2,
- Protein unc-119 homolog, and
- SDCBP

== See also ==
- Cluster of differentiation
- Benralizumab
- Mepolizumab
- Reslizumab
