= Depemokimab =

Medication

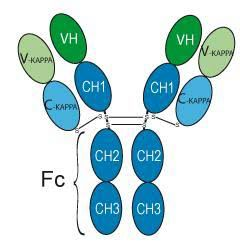

Monoclonal antibody
- Type: Whole antibody
- Source: Humanized (from mouse)
- Target: Interleukin 5

Clinical data
- Trade names: Exdensur
- Other names: AQ-82742999; GSK 294; GSK3511294, depemokimab-ulaa
- AHFS/Drugs.com: Monograph
- MedlinePlus: a626019
- License data: US DailyMed: Depemokimab
- Routes of administration: Subcutaneous
- Drug class: Immunological agent
- ATC code: R03DX12 (WHO)

Legal status
- Legal status: CA: ℞-only; UK: POM (Prescription only); US: ℞-only; EU: Rx-only

Identifiers
- CAS Number: 2243274-14-6
- DrugBank: DB18846
- UNII: D16EQP0KKH
- KEGG: D12169
- ChEMBL: ChEMBL4650469

Depemokimab, sold under the brand name Exdensur, is a humanized monoclonal antibody used for the treatment of asthma. Depemokimab is an interleukin-5 (IL-5) antagonist monoclonal antibody (humanized immunoglobulin G1 [IgG1] kappa). Depemokimab was developed by GSK. It is structurally similar to mepolizumab but contains seven amino acid substitutions in the heavy chain sequence.

Depemokimab was approved for medical use in both the United Kingdom and United States in December 2025.

== Medical uses ==
In the United Kingdom and the European Union, depemokimab is indicated as an add-on maintenance treatment of asthma in people aged twelve years of age and older with type 2 inflammation characterized by an eosinophilic phenotype who are inadequately controlled on maximum moderate-dose or high-dose inhaled corticosteroids plus another asthma controller; and as an add-on therapy with intranasal corticosteroids for the treatment of adults with severe chronic rhinosinusitis with nasal polyps for whom therapy with systemic corticosteroids and/or surgery do not provide adequate control.

In the United States, depemokimab is indicated for add-on maintenance treatment of severe asthma characterized by an eosinophilic phenotype in people aged twelve years of age and older.

== Society and culture ==
=== Legal status ===
Depemokimab was approved for medical use in both the United Kingdom and United States in December 2025.

In December 2025, the Committee for Medicinal Products for Human Use of the European Medicines Agency adopted a positive opinion, recommending the granting of a marketing authorization for the medicinal product Exdensur, intended for severe eosinophilic asthma and for severe chronic rhinosinusitis with nasal polyps. The applicant for this medicinal product is GlaxoSmithKline Trading Services Limited. Depemokimab was authorized for medical use in the European Union in February 2026.

=== Names ===
Depemokimab is the international nonproprietary name.

Depemokimab is sold under the brand name Exdensur.
