= Eosinophil =

Type of white blood cells

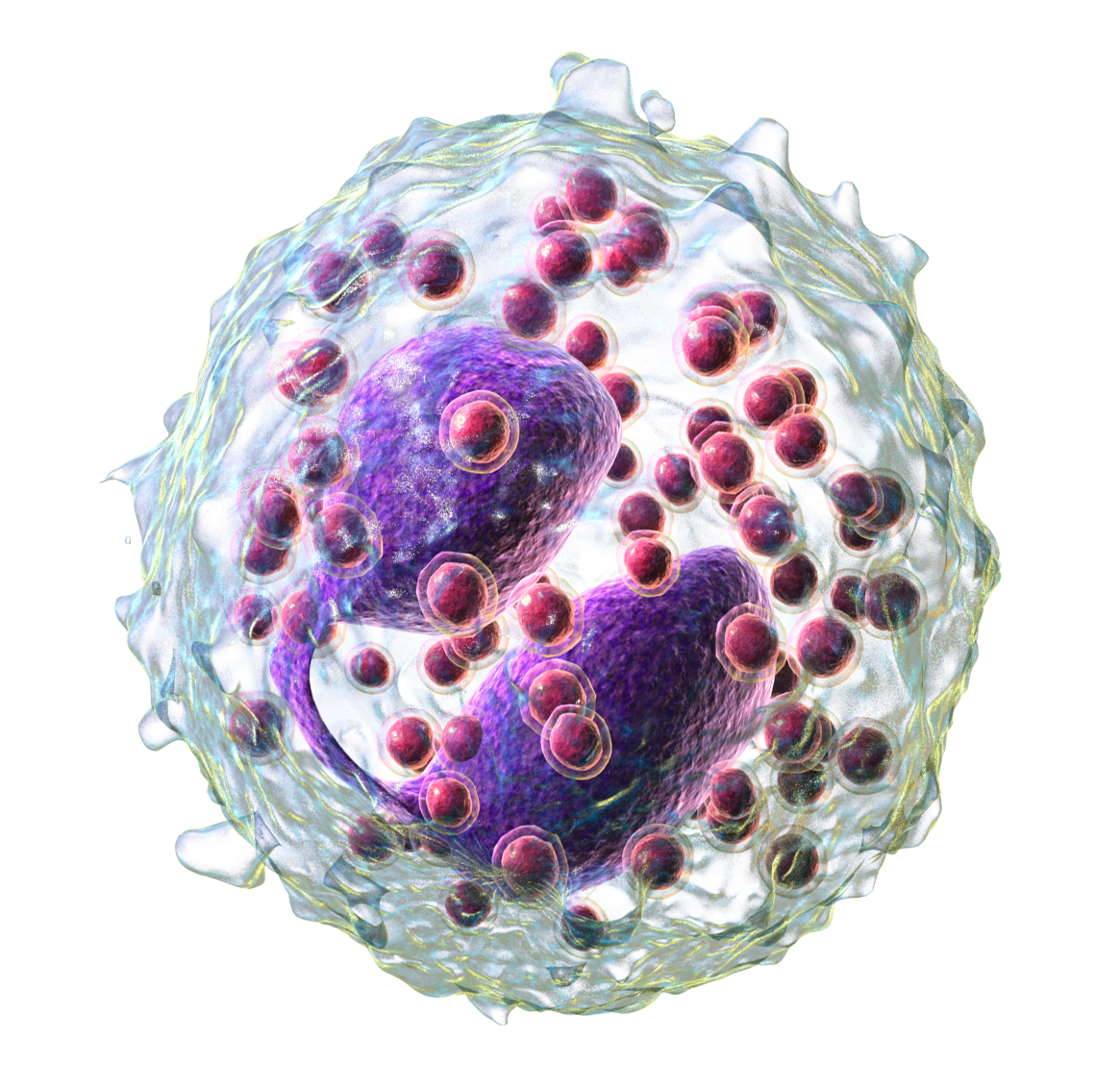
- 3D rendering of eosinophil

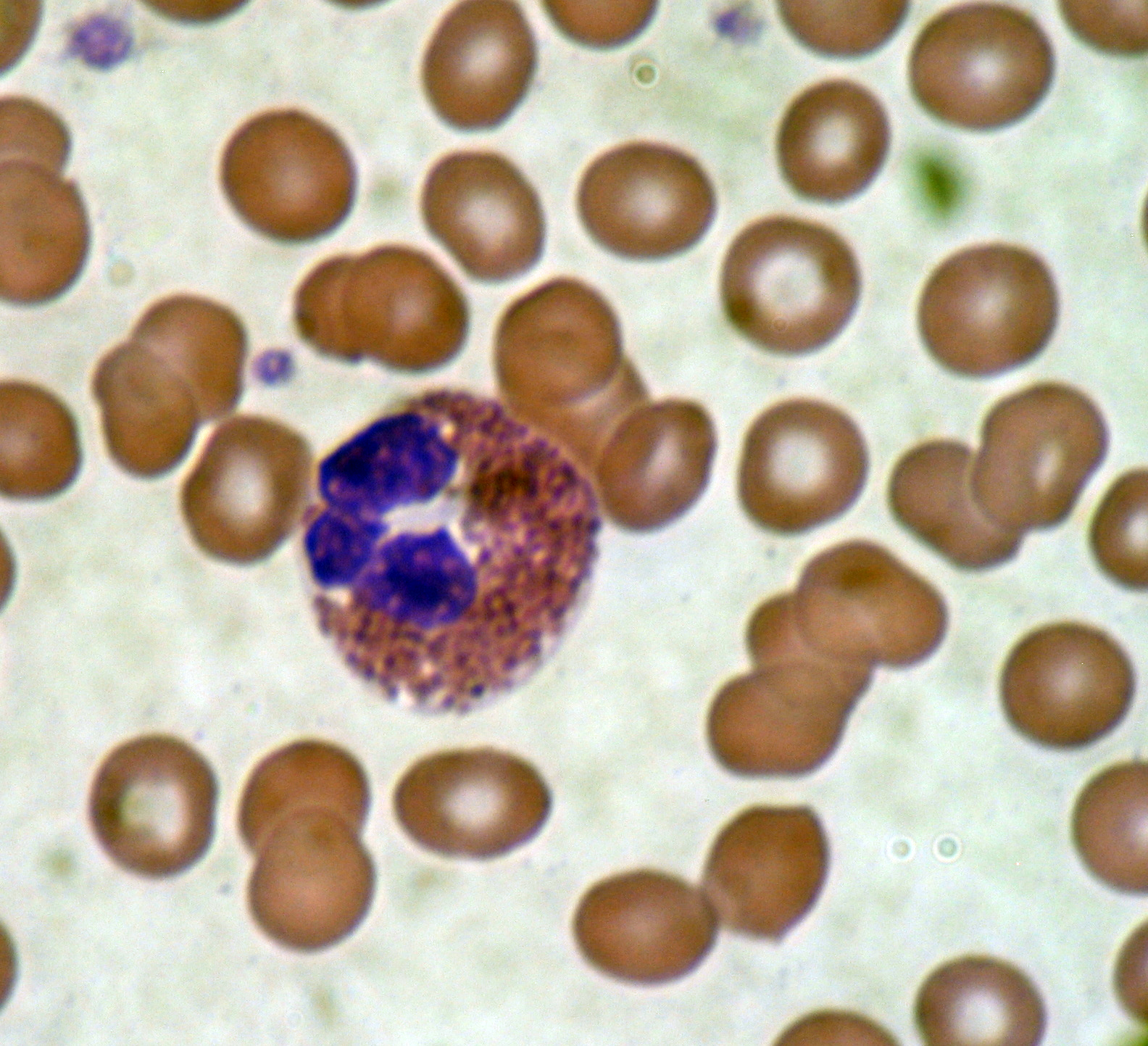
- Eosinophil under the microscope (400×) from a peripheral blood smear. Red blood cells surround the eosinophil, two platelets at the top left corner.

Details
- Pronunciation: /ˌiːoʊˈsɪnəfɪl/)
- System: Immune system

Identifiers
- MeSH: D004804
- TH: H2.00.04.1.02017
- FMA: 62861

Eosinophils, sometimes called eosinophiles or, less commonly, acidophils, are a variety of white blood cells and one of the immune system components responsible for combating multicellular parasites and certain infections in vertebrates. Along with mast cells and basophils, they also control mechanisms associated with allergy and asthma. They are granulocytes that develop during hematopoiesis in the bone marrow before migrating into blood, after which they are terminally differentiated and do not multiply.

These cells are eosinophilic or "acid-loving" due to their large acidophilic cytoplasmic granules, which show their affinity for acids by their affinity to coal tar dyes: Normally transparent, it is this affinity that causes them to appear brick-red after staining with eosin, a red dye, using the Romanowsky method. The staining is concentrated in small granules within the cellular cytoplasm, which contain many chemical mediators, such as eosinophil peroxidase, ribonuclease (RNase), deoxyribonucleases (DNase), lipase, plasminogen, and major basic protein. These mediators are released by a process called degranulation following activation of the eosinophil, and are toxic to both parasite and host tissues.

In normal individuals, eosinophils make up about 1–3% of white blood cells, and are about 12–17 micrometres in size with bilobed nuclei. While eosinophils are released into the bloodstream, they reside in tissue. They are found in the medulla and the junction between the cortex and medulla of the thymus, and, in the lower gastrointestinal tract, ovaries, uterus, spleen, prostate, and lymph nodes, but not in the skin, lungs, esophagus, or some other internal organs under normal conditions. The presence of eosinophils in these latter organs is associated with disease. For instance, patients with eosinophilic asthma have high levels of eosinophils that lead to inflammation and tissue damage, making it more difficult for patients to breathe. Eosinophils persist in the circulation for 8–12 hours, and can survive in tissue for an additional 8–12 days in the absence of stimulation. Pioneering work in the 1980s elucidated that eosinophils were unique granulocytes, having the capacity to survive for extended periods of time after their maturation as demonstrated by ex-vivo culture experiments.

== Development ==
Blood cell lineage

TH2 and ILC2 cells both express the transcription factor GATA-3, which promotes the production of TH2 cytokines, including the interleukins (ILs). IL-5 controls the development of eosinophils in the bone marrow, as they differentiate from myeloid precursor cells. Their lineage fate is determined by transcription factors, including GATA and C/EBP. Eosinophils produce and store many secondary granule proteins before they go out of the bone marrow. After maturation, eosinophils circulate in blood and migrate to inflammatory sites in tissues, or to sites of helminth infection in response to chemokines like CCL11 (eotaxin-1), CCL24 (eotaxin-2), CCL5 (RANTES), 5-hydroxyicosatetraenoic acid and 5-oxo-eicosatetraenoic acid, and certain leukotrienes like leukotriene B4 (LTB4) and MCP1/4. Interleukin-13, another TH2 cytokine, primes eosinophilic leave the bone marrow by lining vessel walls with adhesion molecules such as VCAM-1 and ICAM-1. When eosinophils are activated, they undergo cytolysis, where the breaking of the cell releases eosinophilic granules found in extracellular DNA traps. High concentrations of these DNA traps are known to cause cellular damage, as the granules they contain are responsible for the ligand-induced secretion of eosinophilic toxins which cause structural damage. There is evidence to suggest that eosinophil granule protein expression is regulated by the non-coding RNA EGOT.

== Function ==
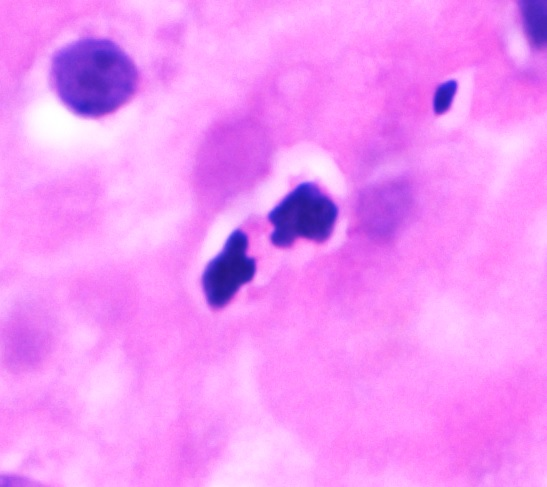
Histology of an eosinophil within epithelium, characterized by its bilobed nucleus despite scant visible eosinophilic cytoplasm.

Following activation, eosinophils effector functions include production of the following:

- Cationic granule proteins and their release by degranulation
- Reactive oxygen species such as hypobromite, superoxide, and peroxide (hypobromous acid, which is preferentially produced by eosinophil peroxidase)
- Lipid mediators like the eicosanoids from the leukotriene (e.g., LTC_{4}, LTD_{4}, LTE_{4}) and prostaglandin (e.g., PGE_{2}) families
- Enzymes, such as elastase
- Growth factors such as TGF beta, VEGF, and PDGF
- Cytokines such as IL-1, IL-2, IL-4, IL-5, IL-6, IL-8, IL-9, IL-13, and TNF alpha

There are also eosinophils that play a role in fighting viral infections, which is evident from the abundance of RNases they contain within their granules, and in fibrin removal during inflammation. Eosinophils, along with basophils and mast cells, are important mediators of allergic responses and asthma pathogenesis and are associated with disease severity. They also fight helminth (worm) colonization and may be slightly elevated in the presence of certain parasites. Eosinophils are also involved in many other biological processes, including postpubertal mammary gland development, oestrus cycling, allograft rejection and neoplasia. They have also been implicated in antigen presentation to T cells.

Eosinophils are responsible for tissue damage and inflammation in many diseases, including asthma. High levels of interleukin-5 has been observed to up regulate the expression of adhesion molecules, which then facilitate the adhesion of eosinophils to endothelial cells, thereby causing inflammation and tissue damage.

An accumulation of eosinophils in the nasal mucosa is considered a major diagnostic criterion for allergic rhinitis (nasal allergies).

== Granule proteins ==
Following activation by an immune stimulus, eosinophils degranulate to release an array of cytotoxic granule cationic proteins that are capable of inducing tissue damage and dysfunction. These include:

- major basic protein (MBP)
- eosinophil cationic protein (ECP)
- eosinophil peroxidase (EPX)
- eosinophil-derived neurotoxin (EDN)

Major basic protein, eosinophil peroxidase, and eosinophil cationic protein are toxic to many tissues. Eosinophil cationic protein and eosinophil-derived neurotoxin are ribonucleases with antiviral activity. Major basic protein induces mast cell and basophil degranulation, and is implicated in peripheral nerve remodelling. Eosinophil cationic protein creates toxic pores in the membranes of target cells, allowing potential entry of other cytotoxic molecules to the cell, can inhibit proliferation of T cells, suppress antibody production by B cells, induce degranulation by mast cells, and stimulate fibroblast cells to secrete mucus and glycosaminoglycans. Eosinophil peroxidase forms reactive oxygen species and reactive nitrogen intermediates that promote oxidative stress in the target, causing cell death by apoptosis and necrosis.

== Clinical significance ==
=== Blood count ===
Strong evidence indicates that blood eosinophil counts can predict the effectiveness of specific anti-inflammatory drugs. Despite their increasing use in clinical practice, data on "normal" blood eosinophil counts remain insufficient. Due to the right-skewed distribution of these counts, median values are more informative than mean values for determining normal levels. Few large-scale studies have reported median blood eosinophil counts, with the median for healthy individuals being 100 cells/μL and the 95th percentile at 420 cells/μL. Thus, it is now evident that the normal median blood eosinophil count in healthy adults is around 100 cells/μL, with counts above 400 cells/μL considered outside the normal range. Current cutoffs such as 150 or 300 cells/μL used in asthma or COPD management fall within the normal range.

=== Eosinophilia ===
An increase in eosinophils, i.e., the presence of more than 500 eosinophils/microliter of blood is called an eosinophilia, and is typically seen in people with a parasitic infestation of the intestines; autoimmune and collagen vascular disease (such as rheumatoid arthritis) and Systemic lupus erythematosus; malignant diseases such as eosinophilic leukemia, clonal hypereosinophilia, and Hodgkin lymphoma; lymphocyte-variant hypereosinophilia; extensive skin diseases (such as exfoliative dermatitis); Addison's disease and other causes of low corticosteroid production (corticosteroids suppress blood eosinophil levels); reflux esophagitis (in which eosinophils will be found in the squamous epithelium of the esophagus) and eosinophilic esophagitis; and with the use of certain drugs such as penicillin. But, perhaps the most common cause for eosinophilia is an allergic condition such as asthma. In 1989, contaminated L-tryptophan supplements caused a deadly form of eosinophilia known as eosinophilia-myalgia syndrome, which was reminiscent of the toxic oil syndrome in Spain in 1981.

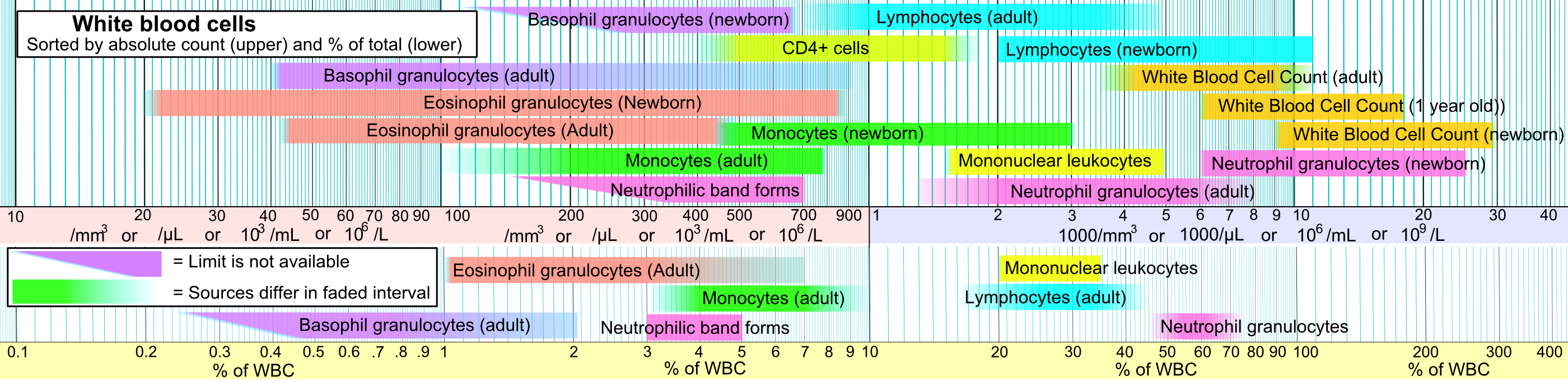
Reference ranges for blood tests of white blood cells, comparing eosinophil granulocyte amount (shown in light red) with other cells

Eosinophils play an important role in asthma as the number of accumulated eosinophils corresponds to the severity of asthmatic reaction. Eosinophilia in mice models are shown to be associated with high interleukin-5 levels. Furthermore, mucosal bronchial biopsies conducted on patients with diseases such as asthma have been found to have higher levels of interleukin-5 leading to higher levels of eosinophils. The infiltration of eosinophils at these high concentrations causes an inflammatory reaction. This ultimately leads to airway remodelling and difficulty of breathing.

Eosinophils can also cause tissue damage in the lungs of asthmatic patients. High concentrations of eosinophil major basic protein and eosinophil-derived neurotoxin that approach cytotoxic levels are observed at degranulation sites in the lungs as well as in the asthmatic sputum.

=== Treatment ===
Treatments used to combat autoimmune diseases and conditions caused by eosinophils include:

- corticosteroids – promote apoptosis. Numbers of eosinophils in blood are rapidly reduced
- monoclonal antibody therapy – e.g., mepolizumab or reslizumab against IL-5, prevents eosinophilopoiesis, or benralizumab against IL-5 receptor, which eliminates eosinophils through ADCC
- antagonists of leukotriene synthesis or receptors
- imatinib (STI571) – inhibits PDGF-BB in hypereosinophilic leukemia

Monoclonal antibodies such as dupilumab and lebrikizumab target IL-13 and its receptor, which reduces eosinophilic inflammation in patients with asthma due to lowering the number of adhesion molecules present for eosinophils to bind to, thereby decreasing inflammation. Mepolizumab and benralizumab are other treatment options that target the alpha subunit of the IL-5 receptor, thereby inhibiting its function and reducing the number of developing eosinophils as well as the number of eosinophils leading to inflammation through antibody-dependent cell-mediated cytotoxicity and eosinophilic apoptosis. Lysosomotropic agents are an efficient means to target the lysosome-like eosinophil granules inducing eosinophil apoptosis.

== Animal studies ==
Within the fat (adipose) tissue of CCR2 deficient mice, there is an increased number of eosinophils, greater alternative macrophage activation, and a propensity towards type 2 cytokine expression. Furthermore, this effect was exaggerated when the mice became obese from a high fat diet.

Mouse models of eosinophilia from mice infected with T. canis showed an increase in IL-5 mRNA in mice spleen.

Mouse models of asthma from OVA show a higher TH2 response. When mice are administered IL-12 to induce the TH1 response, the TH2 response becomes suppressed, showing that mice without TH2 cytokines are significantly less likely to express asthma symptoms.

== See also ==
- Eosinopenia, decrease in eosinophil blood count
- Eosinophilia, increase (>500 cells per microliter) in eosinophil blood count
- Hypereosinophilia, extreme increase (>1,500 cells per microliter) in eosinophil blood count
- Clonal hypereosinophilia, presence of a premalignant or malignant clone of eosinophils in bone marrow and blood
- Chronic eosinophilic leukemia
- Acidophile (histology)
- List of distinct cell types in the adult human body
