= ERICH2 =

Protein-coding gene in the species Homo sapiens

Identifiers
- Aliases: ERICH2, glutamate rich 2
- External IDs: MGI: 1913998; HomoloGene: 75226; GeneCards: ERICH2; OMA:ERICH2 - orthologs

Gene location (Mouse)
Chr.	Chromosome 2 (mouse)
Band	2|2 C2	Start	70,339,163 bp
Band	2|2 C2	End	70,371,228 bp
Orthologs
Species	Human	Mouse
Entrez	285141	66748
Ensembl	ENSG00000204334	ENSMUSG00000075302
UniProt	A1L162	n/a
RefSeq (mRNA)	NM_001289947; NM_001290030; NM_001290031	NM_025744
RefSeq (protein)	NP_001276876; NP_001276959; NP_001276960	n/a
Location (UCSC)	n/a	Chr 2: 70.34 – 70.37 Mb
PubMed search
- Wikidata
View/Edit Human	View/Edit Mouse

Glutamate Rich Protein 2 is a protein in humans encoded by the gene ERICH2. This protein is expressed heavily in male tissues specifically in the testes, and proteins are specifically found in the nucleoli fibrillar center and the vesicles of these testicular cells. The protein has multiple protein interactions which indicate that it may play a role in histone modification and proper histone functioning.

== Gene ==
ERICH2 gene location as depicted by the National Center for Biotechnology Information (NCBI).

ERICH2 is located on human Chromosome 2, at 2q31.1. It contains 10 distinct exons. The gene itself is 28,930 base pairs long and is flanked by the EIF2S2P4 and GAD1 genes. There are no known paralogs of the ERICH2 gene.

== mRNA ==
ERICH2 transcription produces three validated distinct mRNA variants. The longest transcript variant is 1,388 base pairs in length, 1,311 of which are coding. The second variant differs from the first in its 5' UTR. It also has coding sequence differences and a distinct N-terminus compared to variant 1. Variant 3 lacks several exons, has a distinct 3' UTR and C- terminus coding region. This variant is also shorter than the other two at 1,063 base pairs.

Cartoon of the ERICH2 protein. The green box represents the PHA03247 domain, the orange box represents the amidation site, the blue box represents the cAMP- and cGMP- dependent protein kinase binding site. The gray box labels P represents an area rich in Proline, while the gray box label conserved is that in which is conserved throughout distant orthologs. the gray tags represent phosphorylation sites, and the red flags represents sites of glutamate amino acids. The green lines on the top of the cartoon represent the Pat4 nuclear localization signals while the gray brackets represent the Pat7 localization signals.

== Protein ==
The ERICH2 protein is 436 amino acids in length, and has a molecular weight of approximately 48,000 kD, with an isoelectric point of approximately 5. The protein is determined to be rich in the amino acid proline and low in tyrosine and glycine.

=== Motifs and domains ===
Conceptual Translation of ERICH2. Intron-exon boundaries are highlighted in yellow. The PHA03247 domain is highlight it light gray. The acetylation site is in orange font. The amidation site is in light blue font. The c-AMP and c-GMP dependent protein kinase phosphorylation site is highlighted teal. Phosphorylation sites are in pink text. The most conserved region in distant orthologs is highlighted green. The beta strand structure is represented by a black arrow. The alpha helix structure is represented by a purple arrow.

Two known motifs were found in the human ERICH2 protein. The KKNT motif functions in cAMP- and cGMP- dependent protein phosphorylation, this protein motif was found only in primates. There is also a FGRR motif conserved in mammals that is defined as an amidation site. Finally the ERICH2 protein contains the PHA03247 domain that is 32 amino acids long. This domain is not generally conserved through orthologs and the function is unknown. It is present in the proteins that make up the herpes virion.

=== Structure and localization ===
Secondary structure prediction shows one alpha helix and one beta strand formation. The alpha helix encompasses the entire conserved section as seen in the cartoon of the ERICH2 protein. The beta strand is predicted 12 amino acids down from the amidation site and encompasses 4 amino acids. Four nuclear localization signals were found in the protein, two pat4 signals and two pat7 signals, their locations are shown in the cartoon. It is predicted in the 78th percent that the protein resides in the nucleus.

== Expression ==
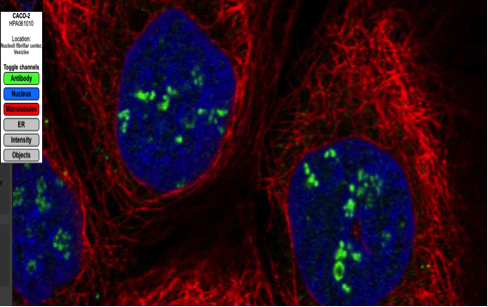
A fluoroscopy of human cells, from the CACO-2 cell line of colorectal cancer, showing the presence of the ERICH2 antibody, as well as highlighted microtubules and DNA. The figure shows the location of the ERICH2 protein, mainly in the nucleoli fibrillar center and vesicles.

ERICH2 is not ubiquitously expressed. It however, has been shown to be expressed narrowly in the choroid plexus of a developing fetus and in the testes of adults. Lung and female tissue expression were also present but expression was greatly decreased. Proteins are specifically located in the nucleoli fibrillar center and the vesicles within cells.

=== Regulation of expression ===
Many phosphorylation sites are predicted for the ERICH2 protein. None are predicted on tyrosines only on serines and the threonines. There is also a predicted acetylation site at the N-terminus of the protein, specifically it is predicted on the third amino acid. Many SOX/SRY-sex/testis determining and related HMG box factor transcription factors and estrogen related transcription factors are predicted to bind and regulate transcription of ERICH2.

== Function ==
=== Interacting proteins ===
ERICH2 interacts with proteins in the H2A family. The H2A proteins specifically play a role in the octamer structure of histone. ERICH2 is specifically known to interact with the H2AFY protein, which plays a key role in the stable X chromosome inactivation and can function by replacing a normal H2A in certain nucleosomes and thus repressing transcription.

ERICH2 is also known to interact with the protein SDCB1 which functions in vesicle trafficking and the regulation of growth and proliferation of certain cancer cells.

The IWS1 protein also interacts with ERICH2. This protein functions as a transcription factor and plays a key role in defining the composition of the RNA polymerase II elongation complex. This complex then plays a role in histone modification and proper splicing.

Two-hybrid assays and other protein interaction methods have shown an interaction with the PSORS1C2 protein, but the function of this protein remains unknown.

== Homology ==
No paralogs for the ERICH2 protein are known. ERICH2 has 124 known orthologs spanning multiple taxa.

Genus and species	Common name	Date of Divergence (MYA)	Sequence length (aa)	Sequence identity	Sequence similarity
Homo sapiens	Human	0	436	--	--
Rousettus aegyptiacus	Egyptian fruit bat	94	430	58%	63%
Propithecus coquereli	Coquerel's sifaka	74	323	54%	60%
Mus musculus	Mouse	90	463	47%	56%
Ursus Maritimus	Polar Bear	94	296	50%	53%
Alligator mississippiensis	American Alligator	320	370	28%	38%
Thamnophis sirtalis	Common Garter Snake	320	309	27%	37%
Callorhinchus milii	Australian Ghost Shark	465	319	22%	33%
Danio rerio	Zebra Fish	432	310	24%	30%
Strongylocentrotus purpuratus	Purple Sea Urchin	627	470	23%	25%
Crassostrea gigas	Pacific Oyster	758	293	17%	22%
Bemisia tabaci	Silverleaf Whitefly	758	213	13%	14%
Trichoplax adhaerens	Trichoplax	930	164	12%	15%
