= Cystin-1 =

Protein

CYS1

Identifiers
- Aliases: CYS1, cystin 1
- External IDs: MGI: 2177632; GeneCards: CYS1

Gene location (Human)
Chr.	Chromosome 2 (human)
Band	2p25.1	Start	10,056,473 bp
Band	2p25.1	End	10,080,944 bp

Gene location (Mouse)
Chr.	Chromosome 12 (mouse)
Band	12 A1.3|12 8.49 cM	Start	24,715,832 bp
Band	12 A1.3|12 8.49 cM	End	24,731,812 bp
RNA expression pattern
Bgee	Human / Mouse (ortholog); Top expressed in: renal medulla; body of pancreas; human kidney; testicle; pancreatic ductal cell; ascending aorta; parotid gland; tibial arteries; Achilles tendon; gallbladder / Top expressed in: aortic valve; ascending aorta; iris; ciliary body; ankle; epithelium of lens; renal cortex; human kidney; Paneth cell; retinal pigment epithelium; More reference expression data
BioGPS	n/a
Orthologs
Databases	NCBI: entry; OMA: entry
Species	Human	Mouse
Entrez	192668	12879
Ensembl	ENSG00000205795	ENSMUSG00000062563
UniProt	Q717R9	Q8R4T1
RefSeq (mRNA)	NM_001037160	NM_001004455; NM_001161807; NM_138686
RefSeq (protein)	NP_001032237	NP_001004455; NP_001155279; NP_619627
Location (UCSC)	Chr 2: 10.06 – 10.08 Mb	Chr 12: 24.72 – 24.73 Mb
PubMed search
- Wikidata
View/Edit Human	View/Edit Mouse

Cystin-1, also known as CYS1, is a novel cilia associated protein which in humans is encoded by the Cystin 1 gene on chromosome 2. The gene is highly expressed in the tissues of the kidneys. There are no known paralogs of Cystin-1 in humans, but has orthologs in mammals, birds, and some reptiles.

== Gene ==
The Cystin 1 gene is found on the negative strand of chromosome 2 in humans, with the exact location at 2p25.1. It contains 3 exons, spanning 3045 base pairs.

=== Expression ===
The gene is overwhelmingly expressed within tissues in the kidneys. Lower expression levels are found in the ovaries, endometrium, lung, and gallbladder.

=== Clinical Significance ===
Gene expression levels are increased in the ovary of those who experience ovarian endometriosis. There are also studies that connect the expression of Cystin to polycystic kidney disease, but direct impact is unknown.

== Protein ==
Cystin-1 consists of 158 amino acids and has a molecular weight of ~16.4kDa.

=== Interactions ===
There are not many known interacting proteins with Cystin-1. Table 1 shows just a few possible interactions.

Gene	Abbreviation	Functions
unc-119 lipid binding chaperone	UNC119	Used to maintain localization
N-myritstoyltransferase 1	NMT1	Used to maintain localization
Phospholipase C gamme 1	PLCG2	Enable protein kinase activity
Regulator of Telomere elongation helicase 1	RTEL1	Enables ATP binding and DNA helicase activity
Epidermal growth factor receptor	EGFR	Biomarker for several diseases (including cancers)

Table 1. Interactions with Cystin-1 based on affinity chromatography technology from Alliance of Genome Resources.

=== Subcellular Location ===
Based on protein interactions with UNC119B, Cystin-1 is predicted to be localized within the cilia of the cell. How this protein makes its way to the cilia is still unknown.

== Homology ==
=== Paralogs ===
There are currently no known paralog of Cystin-1 within humans.

=== Orthologs ===
Orthologs of Cystin-1 were found in vertebrates, but not invertebrates.

	Genus and Species	Common Name	Taxonomy	Date of divergence from Humans (MYA)	NCBI Accession	Sequence identity to humans	Sequence Similarity to humans
Mammal	Homo sapiens	Humans	Primates	0	NP_001032237	100%	100%
	Pongo abelii	Sumatran Orangutan	Primates	18	XP_024098426	92.40%	93.70%
	Monodon monoceros	Narwhal	Cetacea	94	XP_029088030.1	67.30%	74.20%
	Phyllostomus hastatus	Spear nosed bat	Chiroptera	94	XP_045700664.1	66.50%	72%
	Cervus canadensis	Elk	Artiodactyla	94	XP_043325302.1	65.40%	71%
	Acinonyx jubatus	Cheetah	Carnivora	94	XP_026933675.0	61.90%	68.50%
	Mus musculus	House Mouse	Rodentia	87	AAI39303.0	58.20%	65.80%
	Manis javanica	Sunda Pangolin	Pholidota	94	KAI5938697.0	27.10%	29%
Reptilia							
	Gopherus evgoodei	Goode's Thornscrub Tortoise	Testudines	319	XP_030411302.1	38%	44.30%
	Varanus komodoensis	Komodo Dragon	Squamata	319	XP_044275134.1	36.30%	44%
	Lacerta agilis	Sand Lizard	Squamata	319	XP_032998985.1	35.60%	44.40%
	Chelydra serpentina	Common Snapping Turtle	Testudines	318	KAG6933055	23%	26.60%
Aves							
	Vidua chalybeata	Village Indigo Brid	Passeriformes	319	XP_053794446.1	36%	40.90%
	Poecile atricapillus	Black Capped Chickadee	Passeriformes	319	XP_058691046.1	35.70%	41.50%
	Pipra filicauda	Wire-tailed Manakin	Passeriformes	319	XP_039240811.1	35.60%	39.50%
	Apus apus	Common Swift	Apodiformes	319	XP_051469776.1	35.40%	42.30%

Table 2. Species that have the Cystin-1 ortholog
