= Mepolizumab =

Monoclonal antibody medication

Monoclonal antibody
- Type: Whole antibody
- Source: Humanized (from mouse)
- Target: IL-5

Clinical data
- Trade names: Nucala
- AHFS/Drugs.com: Monograph
- MedlinePlus: a615058
- License data: US DailyMed: Mepolizumab
- Pregnancy category: AU: B1
- Routes of administration: Subcutaneous injection
- ATC code: R03DX09 (WHO)

Legal status
- Legal status: AU: S4 (Prescription only); CA: ℞-only; US: ℞-only; EU: Rx-only

Pharmacokinetic data
- Bioavailability: 80% (estimate)
- Protein binding: None
- Metabolism: Proteolytic enzymes
- Elimination half-life: 20 (16–22) days

Identifiers
- CAS Number: 196078-29-2
- DrugBank: DB06612
- ChemSpider: None
- UNII: 90Z2UF0E52
- KEGG: D04923

Chemical and physical data
- Molar mass: 149 kDa

Mepolizumab, sold under the brand name Nucala, is a humanized monoclonal antibody used for the treatment of severe eosinophilic asthma, chronic obstructive pulmonary disease (COPD) of an eosinophilic phenotype, eosinophilic granulomatosis with polyangiitis, and hypereosinophilic syndrome.

The most common side effects include headache, injection site reactions, and back pain.

== Medical uses ==
Mepolizumab is approved by the US Food and Drug Administration (FDA) for the maintenance treatment of severe asthma in patients aged six years or older and with an eosinophilic phenotype in combination with other medicines used to treat asthma. In the European Union it is approved as an add-on treatment for severe refractory eosinophilic asthma in adults.

In studies, mepolizumab cut the necessity for hospitalisation due to asthma exacerbations in half, as compared to placebo.

In December 2017, the FDA expanded mepolizumab's indication to treat adults with eosinophilic granulomatosis with polyangiitis, which is a rare autoimmune condition that can cause vasculitis.

In September 2020, the FDA expanded mepolizumab's indication to treat adults and children aged twelve years and older with hypereosinophilic syndrome for six months or longer without another identifiable non-blood related cause of the disease.

In May 2025, the FDA approved mepolizumab as an add-on therapy for people with chronic obstructive pulmonary disease who exhibit an eosinophilic phenotype.

== Side effects ==
Common side effects in clinical trials included headache (19% of patients under mepolizumab treatment versus 18% under placebo), injection site reactions (8% versus 3%), infections of the urinary tract (3% versus 2%) and the lower respiratory tract, eczema and muscle spasms (both 3% versus <1%).

The most common side effects in people with hypereosinophilic syndrome include: upper respiratory tract infection and pain in extremities (such as the hands, legs and feet).

== Overdose ==
Single doses of 15 times the usual therapeutic dose have been tolerated in studies without significant side effects.

== Interactions ==
No interaction studies have been conducted. The interaction potential is considered to be low.

== Pharmacology ==
=== Mechanism of action ===
Mepolizumab binds to IL-5 and prevents it from binding to its receptor, more specifically the interleukin 5 receptor alpha subunit, on the surface of eosinophil white blood cells. While eosinophils play a role in inflammation associated with asthma, the exact mechanism of mepolizumab is unknown.

=== Pharmacokinetics ===
After subcutaneous injection, mepolizumab has an estimated bioavailability of 80% and reaches highest blood plasma concentrations after four to eight days. Like other antibodies, it is degraded by proteolytic enzymes. Its biological half-life is 20 days on average, ranging from 16 to 22 days in different individuals.

== Chemistry ==
The substance is an IgG_{1} kappa monoclonal antibody, the two heavy chains consisting of 449 amino acids each, and the two light chains consisting of 220 amino acids each. The protein part has a molar mass of about 146 kDa, and the sugar part of 3 kDa.

== History ==
Phase III clinical trials in severe eosinophilic asthma were completed in 2014.

Mepolizumab was evaluated in a randomized, double-blind, multicenter, placebo-controlled trial in 108 participants with hypereosinophilic syndrome. In the study, participants were randomly assigned to receive mepolizumab or placebo by injection every four weeks. The trial compared the proportion of subjects who experienced a hypereosinophilic syndrome flare during the 32-week treatment period. A hypereosinophilic syndrome flare was defined as worsening of clinical signs and symptoms of hypereosinophilic syndrome or increasing eosinophils (disease-fighting white blood cells) on at least two occasions. The trial compared the proportions of participants with at least one flare over a 32-week treatment period, as well as the time to the first flare. Fewer participants in the mepolizumab treatment group (28%) had hypereosinophilic syndrome flares compared to participants in the placebo group (56%), with a 50% relative reduction. In addition, the time to the first hypereosinophilic syndrome flare was later, on average, for participants treated with mepolizumab versus placebo.

== Society and culture ==
=== Legal status ===
In November 2015, the US Food and Drug Administration (FDA) approved mepolizumab for severe asthma, and in December 2015 mepolizumab was authorized for medical use in the European Union.

In September 2020, mepolizumab was approved in the United States to treat adults and children aged twelve years of age and older with hypereosinophilic syndrome for six months or longer without another identifiable non-blood related cause of the disease.

In January 2024, mepolizumab was approved in China for use in severe asthma with an eosinophilic phenotype.

In May 2025, the FDA approved mepolizumab as an add-on therapy for people with chronic obstructive pulmonary disease who exhibit an eosinophilic phenotype.
