= ARL2 =

Protein-coding gene in the species Homo sapiens

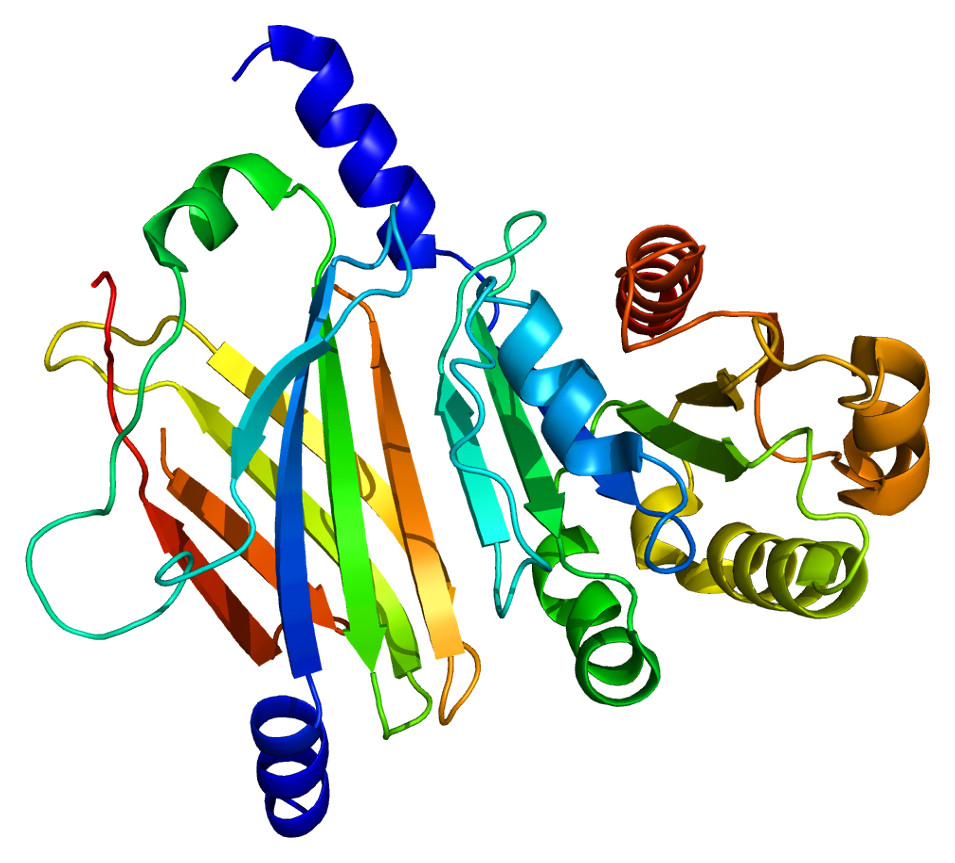

Identifiers
- Aliases: ARL2, ARFL2, ADP ribosylation factor like GTPase 2, MRCS1
- External IDs: OMIM: 601175; MGI: 1928393; GeneCards: ARL2
Available structures
PDB	Ortholog search: PDBe RCSB
PDB	List of PDB id codes 3DOE, 3DOF

Gene location (Human)
Chr.	Chromosome 11 (human)
Band	11q13.1	Start	65,014,160 bp
Band	11q13.1	End	65,022,184 bp

Gene location (Mouse)
Chr.	Chromosome 19 (mouse)
Band	19|19 A	Start	6,184,404 bp
Band	19|19 A	End	6,191,578 bp
RNA expression pattern
Bgee	Human / Mouse (ortholog); Top expressed in: C1 segment; nucleus accumbens; apex of heart; caudate nucleus; putamen; tibial nerve; right frontal lobe; left coronary artery; ascending aorta; right auricle of heart / Top expressed in: muscle of thigh; right ventricle; yolk sac; superior frontal gyrus; dentate gyrus of hippocampal formation granule cell; right kidney; saccule; primary visual cortex; otic placode; otic vesicle; More reference expression data
BioGPS	n/a
Gene ontology
Molecular function	nucleotide binding; GTP binding; GTPase inhibitor activity; protein binding; GTPase activity; GDP binding
Cellular component	cytoplasm; centrosome; lateral plasma membrane; mitochondrial intermembrane space; intracellular anatomical structure; microtubule organizing center; mitochondrial matrix; mitochondrion; cytoskeleton; nucleus; nucleolus; Golgi apparatus; cytosol; focal adhesion; cilium; microtubule cytoskeleton
Biological process	tubulin complex assembly; regulation of insulin secretion; negative regulation of GTPase activity; regulation of microtubule polymerization; bicellular tight junction assembly; positive regulation of microtubule polymerization; cell cycle; maintenance of protein location in nucleus; positive regulation of cell-substrate adhesion; centrosome cycle
Sources:Amigo / QuickGO
Orthologs
Databases	NCBI: entry; OMA: entry
Species	Human	Mouse
Entrez	402	56327
Ensembl	ENSG00000213465	ENSMUSG00000024944
UniProt	P36404	Q9D0J4
RefSeq (mRNA)	NM_001667; NM_001199745	NM_019722
RefSeq (protein)	NP_001186674; NP_001658	NP_062696
Location (UCSC)	Chr 11: 65.01 – 65.02 Mb	Chr 19: 6.18 – 6.19 Mb
PubMed search
- Wikidata
View/Edit Human	View/Edit Mouse

ADP-ribosylation factor-like protein 2 is a protein that in humans is encoded by the ARL2 gene.

== Function ==
- The ADP-ribosylation factor (ARF) genes are small GTP-binding proteins of the RAS superfamily. ARL2 is a member of a functionally distinct group of ARF-like genes.
- In photoreceptors, ARL2 participates in the trafficking of lipidated membrane-associated proteins.
- There is an evidence that increased activity of ARL2 protein is strongly correlated with increased mitochondria fusion, while loss of ARL2 activity results in a decreased rate of fusion.

== Interactions ==
ARL2 has been shown to interact with Protein unc-119 homolog, TBCD and PDE6D.
