= Benralizumab =

Monoclonal antibody

Monoclonal antibody
- Type: Whole antibody
- Source: Humanized (from mouse)
- Target: CD125

Clinical data
- Pronunciation: /bɛn.ræ.ˈlɪz.ʌ.mæb/ ben-ra-LIZ-u-mab
- Trade names: Fasenra
- AHFS/Drugs.com: Monograph
- MedlinePlus: a618002
- License data: US DailyMed: Benralizumab
- Pregnancy category: AU: B1
- Routes of administration: Subcutaneous
- ATC code: R03DX10 (WHO)

Legal status
- Legal status: AU: S4 (Prescription only); CA: ℞-only / Schedule D; UK: POM (Prescription only); US: ℞-only; EU: Rx-only

Identifiers
- CAS Number: 1044511-01-4
- DrugBank: DB12023
- ChemSpider: none
- UNII: 71492GE1FX
- KEGG: D09874

Chemical and physical data
- Formula: C_{6492}H_{10060}N_{1724}O_{2028}S_{42}
- Molar mass: 146056.45 g·mol^{−1}

Benralizumab, sold under the brand name Fasenra, is a monoclonal antibody directed against the alpha chain of the interleukin-5 receptor (CD125). It was developed by MedImmune for the treatment of asthma and is marketed by AstraZeneca.

Two phase III clinical trials of benralizumab reported meeting their primary endpoints in 2016. It was approved by the US Food and Drug Administration in November 2017 for the treatment of severe eosinophilic asthma. It was granted designation as an orphan drug by the Food and Drug Administration for treatment of eosinophilic oesophagitis in August 2019.

Common adverse effects include injection site reactions, which were reported in 2.2% of patients (vs. 1.9% for placebo) in clinical trials.

== Clinical trials ==
In November 2024, the ABRA study found that a single dose of benralizumab could be more effective when injected at the point of exacerbation compared to currently used steroid tablets in patients at high risk of an asthma or chronic obstructive pulmonary disease (COPD).
