= Jacob Churg =

Russian Empire-born Polish-American pathologist

Jacob Churg (/tʃɜːrɡ/; 16 July 1910, Daŭhinava, Russian Empire – 27 July 2005, New York City) was a Jewish-American pathologist. He was born in a shtetl in modern day Belarus. Churg, together with Lotte Strauss, has given his name to Churg–Strauss syndrome, now known as eosinophilic granulomatosis with polyangiitis.

== Works ==
- Influence of Gonadotropic Hormone upon Complement in Rabbit’s Blood. Diss. med. 1936
- Allergic Granulomatosis, Allergic Angiitis, and Periarteritis nodosa (mit L. Strauss). Am J Pathol 27 (1951) 277
- Structural Basis of Renal Disease. 1968
- Nephrology. 1979

== Literature ==
- Eberhard J. Wormer: Angiologie - Phlebologie. Syndrome und ihre Schöpfer. München 1991, S. 23–30, VI–VII
- E. Grishman, T. Faraggiana, V. S. Venkataseshan: The Jacob Churg Festschrift. Introduction. Am J Kidney Dis 10 (1987) 155
- J. A. A. Hunter, Karl Holubar: Dr. Jacob Churg. Am J Dermatopathol 8 (1986) 358
- American Men and Women in Science 2 (1986) 230
- Who’s Who in America. 42nd ed. 1 (1982–1983) 583

== See also ==
- Eosinophilic granulomatosis with polyangiitis (EGPA)
- Pathology
- List of pathologists
