= TBCD =

Protein-coding gene in the species Homo sapiens

Identifiers
- Aliases: TBCD, SSD-1, tfcD, tubulin folding cofactor D, PEBAT
- External IDs: OMIM: 604649; MGI: 1919686; GeneCards: TBCD

Gene location (Human)
Chr.	Chromosome 17 (human)
Band	17q25.3	Start	82,752,042 bp
Band	17q25.3	End	82,945,914 bp

Gene location (Mouse)
Chr.	Chromosome 11 (mouse)
Band	11|11 E2	Start	121,342,775 bp
Band	11|11 E2	End	121,507,990 bp
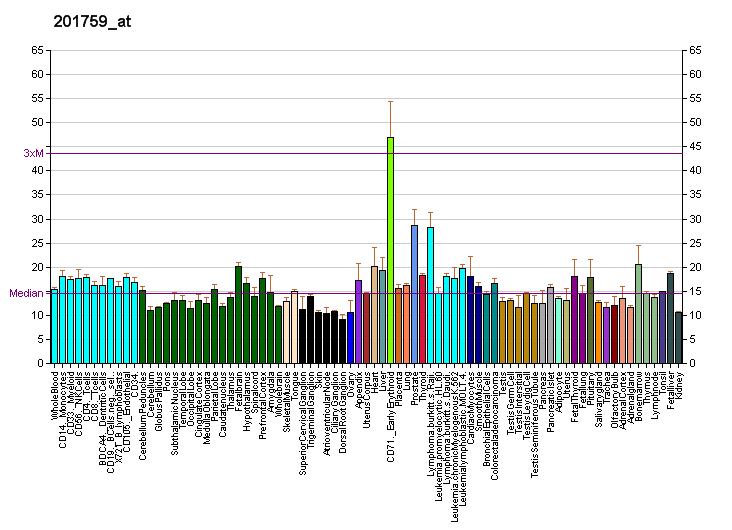
RNA expression pattern
Bgee	Human / Mouse (ortholog); Top expressed in: right lobe of thyroid gland; apex of heart; right hemisphere of cerebellum; left lobe of thyroid gland; canal of the cervix; anterior pituitary; right uterine tube; granulocyte; ectocervix; ventricular zone / Top expressed in: epithelium of lens; Epithelium of choroid plexus; facial motor nucleus; hair follicle; Paneth cell; stroma of bone marrow; trigeminal ganglion; endothelial cell of lymphatic vessel; lacrimal gland; condyle; More reference expression data
BioGPS	More reference expression data
Gene ontology
Molecular function	chaperone binding; GTPase activator activity; protein binding; beta-tubulin binding
Cellular component	cytoplasm; lateral plasma membrane; membrane; bicellular tight junction; adherens junction; plasma membrane; cell junction; microtubule; centrosome; microtubule organizing center; cytoskeleton
Biological process	negative regulation of cell-substrate adhesion; negative regulation of microtubule polymerization; adherens junction assembly; protein folding; bicellular tight junction assembly; positive regulation of GTPase activity; post-chaperonin tubulin folding pathway; mitotic cell cycle; cell morphogenesis involved in neuron differentiation; tubulin complex assembly; microtubule cytoskeleton organization
Sources:Amigo / QuickGO
Orthologs
Databases	NCBI: entry; OMA: entry
Species	Human	Mouse
Entrez	6904	108903
Ensembl	ENSG00000278759; ENSG00000141556	ENSMUSG00000039230
UniProt	Q9BTW9	Q8BYA0
RefSeq (mRNA)	NM_001033052; NM_005993	NM_029878
RefSeq (protein)	NP_005984	NP_084154
Location (UCSC)	Chr 17: 82.75 – 82.95 Mb	Chr 11: 121.34 – 121.51 Mb
PubMed search
- Wikidata
View/Edit Human	View/Edit Mouse

Tubulin-specific chaperone D is a protein that in humans is encoded by the TBCD gene.

== Function ==
Cofactor D is one of four proteins (cofactors A, D, E, and C) involved in the pathway leading to correctly folded beta-tubulin from folding intermediates. Cofactors A and D are believed to play a role in capturing and stabilizing beta-tubulin intermediates in a quasi-native confirmation. Cofactor E binds to the cofactor D/beta-tubulin complex; interaction with cofactor C then causes the release of beta-tubulin polypeptides that are committed to the native state.

== Interactions ==
TBCD has been shown to interact with ARL2.
