= Lotte Strauss =

American pathologist

- Born: 15 April 1913; Nuremberg, Germany
- Died: 4 July 1985 (aged 72); United States
- Known for: Describing Eosinophilic granulomatosis with polyangiitis (EGPA), formerly known as Churg-Strauss Syndrome

Lotte Strauss (15 April 1913 – 4 July 1985) was a Jewish German-American pathologist.

She was born in Nuremberg, Germany. Strauss began medical school in 1932 in Germany, but was forced to flee to Italy due to the increasingly oppressive environment in Nazi Germany. She completed her degree from the University of Sienna in 1937 before again fleeing when Italy passed further anti-Semitic laws in 1938. From Italy she emigrated to the United States.

Strauss, alongside Jacob Churg, attributed her name to Churg–Strauss syndrome, which is now known as eosinophilic granulomatosis with polyangiitis. She was one of the founders of the Society for Pediatric Pathology. Strauss was also part of a group that made significant contributions to the understanding of renal pathology. The group included Lotte Strauss, Jacob Churg and Edith Grishman, and was deemed “most productive for many years”. Strauss became the first pediatric pathologist at Mount Sinai Hospital in Manhattan, New York, and made valuable contributions to the area of fetal development pathology. Lotte Strauss worked with Donald Gribetz at Mount Sinai Hospital in the pediatric pathology department. Later on, she became an associate pathologist in the Division of Pediatric Pathology, as well as a professor of pathology at The Mount Sinai School of Medicine.

The Society for Pediatric Pathology annually awards The Lotte Strauss Prize to an individual under 40 years of age for their contribution to pediatric pathology that has been "published or accepted for publication during the year immediately preceding the award".

== Works ==
- Churg, Jacob., Strauss, Lotte., “Allergic Granulomatosis, Allergic Angiitis, and Periartritis Nodosa” The American Journal of Pathology. Vol. 27, no.2,1951.pp. 277–301
- Kirschner, Paul., Strauss, Lotte. “Pulmonary Interstitial Emphysema in the Newborn Infant Precursors and Sequelae: A Clinical and Pathologic Study.” Disease of The Chest. vol. 46, no. 4, 1964, pp. 417–426. Science Direct, doi:10.1378/chest.46.4.417
- Leonidas, John., Strauss, Lotte., Krasna, Irwin. “Roentgen Diagnosis of Multicystic Renal Dysplasia in Infancy by High Dose Urography.” The Journal of Urology. vol. 108, no. 6, 1972, pp. 963–965. Science Direct, doi:10.1016/s0022-5347(17)60920-0
- Quan, Angel., Strauss, Lotte. “Congenital Cytomegalic Inclusion Disease; Observations in a Macerated Fetus With Congenital Defect, Including a Study of the Placenta.” American Journal of Obstetrics and Gynecology, vol. 83, no. 9, 1962, pp. 1240–1248. Science Direct, doi:10.1016/0002-9378(62)90222-3
- Rausen, Aaron., Seki, Masako., Strauss, Lotte. “Twin Transfusion Syndrome: A Review of 19 Cases Studied at One Institution.” The Journal of Paediatrics. vol. 66, no. 3, 1965, pp. 613–628. Science Direct, doi:10.1016/S0022-3476(65)80125-1
- Rosenfeld, Isadore., Silverblatt, Marvin., Strauss, Lotte. “Total Anomalous Pulmonary Venous Drainage Into the Portal Vein.” American Heart Journal. vol. 53, no. 4, 1957, pp. 616–623. Science Direct, doi:10.1016/0002-8703(57)90368-X
- Sotolongo, Jose., Rose, Judith., Strauss, Lotte., Gribetz, Micheal. “Single Vaginal Ectopic Ureter and the Vater Syndrome.” The Journal of Urology. vol. 127, no. 6, 1982, pp. 1181–1182. Science Direct, doi:10.1016/S0022-5347(17)54286-X
- Strauss, Lotte., Churg, Jacob., Zak, Frederick. “Cutaneous Lesions of Allergive Granulomatosis : A Histopathologic Study.” Journal of Investigative Dermatology. vol. 17, no. 6, 1951, pp. 349–359. Science Direct, doi:10.1038/jid.1951.1951.103

== Achievements ==
In 1983, Strauss was awarded the Jacobi Medallion by the Mount Sinai Alumni. It is based on an individual's "distinguished achievement in the field of medicine or extraordinary service to the Hospital, the School, or the Alumni Association."

== Literature ==
- Eberhard J. Wormer: Angiologie - Phlebologie. Syndrome und ihre Schöpfer. München 1991, S. 23-25
- American Men and Women in Science 6 (1986) 1088
- Obituary: Lotte Strauss, M.D. International Pathol 26 (1985) no. 3
