= Uncoordinated-119 (Unc-119) =

Protein-coding gene in the species Homo sapiens

UNC119
Available structures
PDB	Ortholog search: PDBe RCSB
PDB	List of PDB id codes 3GQQ, 3RBQ, 4GOJ, 4GOK

Identifiers
- Aliases: UNC119, HRG4, IMD13, POC7, POC7A, Protein unc-119 homolog, unc-119 lipid binding chaperone
- External IDs: MGI: 1328357; HomoloGene: 3778; GeneCards: UNC119; OMA:UNC119 - orthologs

Gene location (Human)
Chr.	Chromosome 17 (human)
Band	17q11.2	Start	28,546,708 bp
Band	17q11.2	End	28,552,631 bp

Gene location (Mouse)
Chr.	Chromosome 11 (mouse)
Band	11 B5|11 46.74 cM	Start	78,234,308 bp
Band	11 B5|11 46.74 cM	End	78,239,990 bp
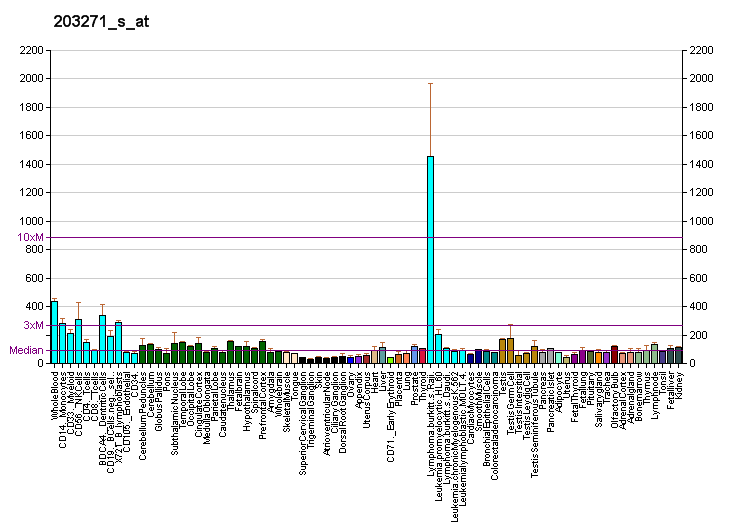
RNA expression pattern
Bgee	Human / Mouse (ortholog); Top expressed in: granulocyte; monocyte; right testis; left testis; right frontal lobe; right hemisphere of cerebellum; spleen; cingulate gyrus; anterior cingulate cortex; blood / Top expressed in: neural layer of retina; retinal pigment epithelium; granulocyte; epithelium of lens; choroid plexus of fourth ventricle; ventricular zone; pineal gland; ciliary body; left colon; neural tube; More reference expression data
BioGPS	More reference expression data
Gene ontology
Molecular function	lipid binding; protein binding
Cellular component	cytoplasm; cytosol; centrosome; spindle pole; spindle; microtubule organizing center; intercellular bridge; spindle midzone; cytoskeleton
Biological process	endocytosis; response to stimulus; positive regulation of protein tyrosine kinase activity; protein transport; visual perception; phototransduction; chemical synaptic transmission; neuron differentiation; lipoprotein transport; negative regulation of clathrin-dependent endocytosis; negative regulation of caveolin-mediated endocytosis; mitotic cytokinesis; nervous system development
Sources:Amigo / QuickGO
Orthologs
Species	Human	Mouse
Entrez	9094	22248
Ensembl	ENSG00000109103	ENSMUSG00000002058
UniProt	Q13432	Q9Z2R6
RefSeq (mRNA)	NM_005148; NM_054035; NM_001330166	NM_011676; NM_001313985; NM_001313986; NM_001313987; NM_001313988
RefSeq (protein)	NP_001317095; NP_005139; NP_473376	NP_001300914; NP_001300915; NP_001300916; NP_001300917; NP_035806
Location (UCSC)	Chr 17: 28.55 – 28.55 Mb	Chr 11: 78.23 – 78.24 Mb
PubMed search
- Wikidata
View/Edit Human	View/Edit Mouse

Uncoordinated-119 (Unc-119) is a protein identified in a varieties of species including C. elegans, humans, mice, zebrafish, rabbits, pig, calf, monkey, and protozoa. This proteins have been classified in the GMP phosphodiesterase, delta superfamily. Although Unc-119 proteins are categorized into their own family, they are shown to be ancestrally related to PrBP (prenyl binding protein) and rhoGDI. They are also known by several other names: Retinal Protein 4, HRG4, POC7 Centriolar Protein Homolog A, IMD13, POC7A, and RG4.

== Structure and function ==
In C. elegans, Unc-119 consistent of approximately 240 amino acids with a mass of around ~26 kDa. Using x-ray crystallography the protein's crystal structure was observed and found to have a resolution of 1.95 Å. It has an immunoglobulin-like β-sandwich folding structure, resulting in a narrow, hydrophobic pocket. This pocket can bind to lauroyl (C12) and myristoyl (C14) acyltransferase side chains, functioning as a transporter or lipid-binding chaperone. Unc-119 is crucial for the motility of cilium, maintaining their formation and function. This role is a conserved responsibility from animals to protozoa.

== Role in cells ==
UNC-119 has been found to be involved in synaptic functions, signal transduction, endosome recycling, uptake of bacteria and endocytosis, protein trafficking, lipid-binding chaperone, and a mediator on Src family kinase signals.

The UNC-119 protein plays key roles in the movement and feeding in the C. elegans, because it is essential in the development and function of their nervous system. One mutation observed was in the expression patterns when the mutant fuses with lacZ. When this protein is mutated or deleted, C. elegans were found to have problems moving, even to the point of complete paralysis. It was also proposed that a mutation could cause the C. elegans to lose the ability to recognize their food. When the organism possesses a mutated UNC-119, they have been shown to experience uncoordinated movement, a defect causing weak egg laying, and the inability to form dauer larvae.

In H. sapiens, Unc-119 has been identified on chromosome 17 and is found predominantly in the retina (HRG4). It has been localized to the photo-receptor synapses in the outer plexiform layer of the retina, and suggested to play a role in the mechanism of photoreceptor neurotransmitter release through the synaptic vesicle cycle. Two transcript variants encoding different isoforms have been described for this gene. The encoded product shares strong homology with the C. elegans unc119 protein and it can functionally complement the C. elegans unc119 mutation.

Unc-119 has also been identified in other areas in humans, such as the liver, kidneys, brain, and fibroblasts. It has also been found to play an important role within the T-cell receptor function and interleukin-5 receptor (IL-5R) Unc-119 is an essential activator of both Lck and Fyn by interacting with their SH2- and SH3-binding domains. Mutation of the Unc-119 gene has been found to severely disrupt the T-cell receptor pathway. It has been suggested to be a cause of an immunodeficiency disorder known as idiopathic CD4 lymphopenia (ICL) due to the reduced t-cell stimulation.

== Interactions ==
Protein unc-119 homolog has been shown to interact with:

- ARL2
- ARL3
- CD247
- CD4
- FYN
- IL5RA
- LYN
- Lck
- RIBEYE
