= Syntenin-1 =

Protein found in humans

SDCBP
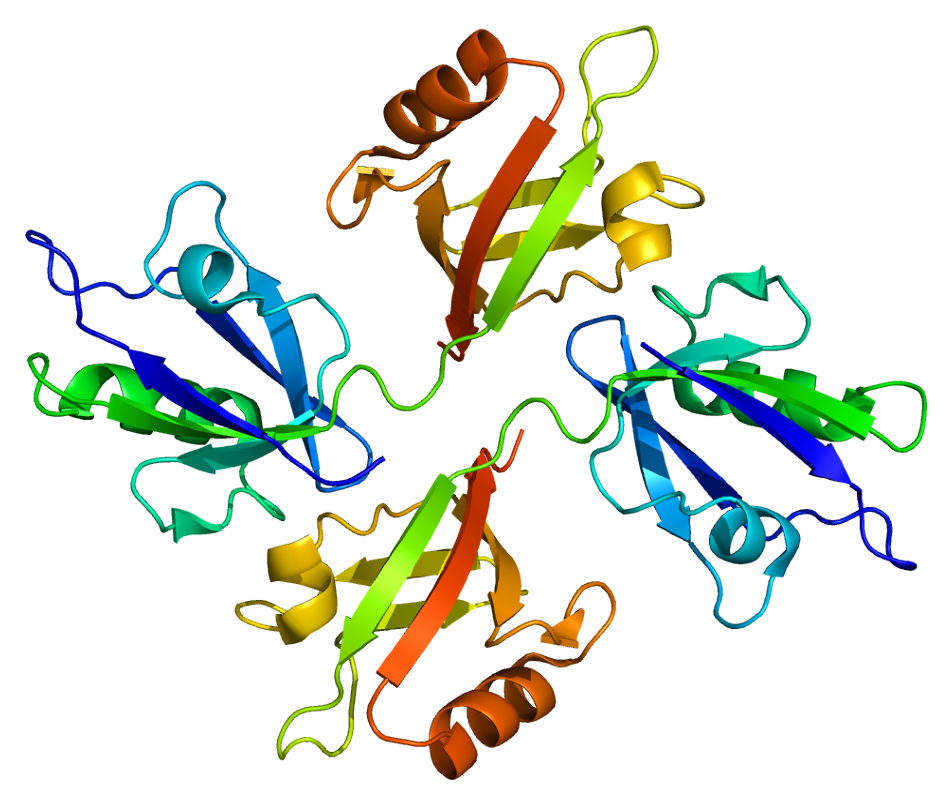

Identifiers
- Aliases: SDCBP, MDA-9, ST1, SYCL, TACIP18, MDA9, syndecan binding protein
- External IDs: OMIM: 602217; MGI: 1337026; GeneCards: SDCBP
Available structures
PDB	Ortholog search: PDBe RCSB
PDB	List of PDB id codes 1N99, 1NTE, 1OBX, 1OBY, 1OBZ, 1R6J, 1V1T, 1W9E, 1W9O, 1W9Q, 1YBO, 4Z33

Gene location (Human)
Chr.	Chromosome 8 (human)
Band	8q12.1	Start	58,552,924 bp
Band	8q12.1	End	58,582,859 bp

Gene location (Mouse)
Chr.	Chromosome 4 (mouse)
Band	4|4 A1	Start	6,365,650 bp
Band	4|4 A1	End	6,408,423 bp
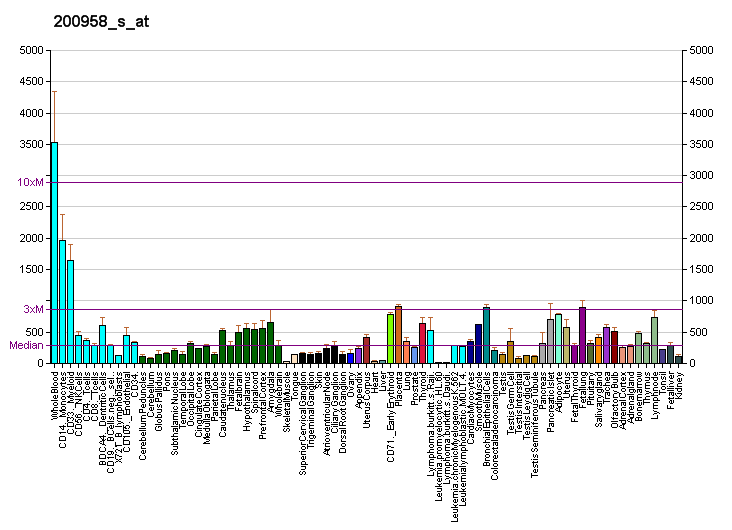
RNA expression pattern
Bgee	Human / Mouse (ortholog); Top expressed in: retinal pigment epithelium; visceral pleura; amniotic fluid; palpebral conjunctiva; parietal pleura; germinal epithelium; blood; skin of hip; ganglionic eminence; monocyte / Top expressed in: stroma of bone marrow; gastrula; fetal liver hematopoietic progenitor cell; pyloric antrum; calvaria; tibiofemoral joint; atrioventricular valve; right lung; mucous cell of stomach; submandibular gland; More reference expression data
BioGPS	More reference expression data
Gene ontology
Molecular function	protein N-terminus binding; frizzled binding; protein binding; identical protein binding; cytoskeletal anchor activity; interleukin-5 receptor binding; phosphatidylinositol-4,5-bisphosphate binding; lipid binding; cadherin binding; syndecan binding; protein heterodimerization activity
Cellular component	cytoplasm; extracellular vesicle; blood microparticle; endoplasmic reticulum membrane; membrane; focal adhesion; melanosome; adherens junction; plasma membrane; cell junction; endoplasmic reticulum; membrane raft; extracellular exosome; cytoskeleton; nucleus; extracellular region; extracellular space; nucleoplasm; cytosol; interleukin-5 receptor; nuclear membrane; azurophil granule lumen; intracellular membrane-bounded organelle
Biological process	positive regulation of transforming growth factor beta receptor signaling pathway; intracellular signal transduction; positive regulation of extracellular exosome assembly; negative regulation of receptor internalization; protein targeting to membrane; ephrin receptor signaling pathway; substrate-dependent cell migration, cell extension; positive regulation of pathway-restricted SMAD protein phosphorylation; positive regulation of JNK cascade; positive regulation of epithelial to mesenchymal transition; regulation of mitotic cell cycle; negative regulation of proteasomal ubiquitin-dependent protein catabolic process; positive regulation of exosomal secretion; positive regulation of phosphorylation; actin cytoskeleton organization; chemical synaptic transmission; positive regulation of cell population proliferation; positive regulation of cell growth; positive regulation of cell migration; neutrophil degranulation
Sources:Amigo / QuickGO
Orthologs
Databases	NCBI: entry; OMA: entry
Species	Human	Mouse
Entrez	6386	53378
Ensembl	ENSG00000137575	ENSMUSG00000028249
UniProt	O00560	O08992
RefSeq (mRNA)	NM_001007067; NM_001007068; NM_001007069; NM_001007070; NM_005625 NM_001330537; NM_001348339; NM_001348340; NM_001348341	NM_001098227; NM_016807
RefSeq (protein)	NP_001007068; NP_001007069; NP_001007070; NP_001007071; NP_001317466 NP_005616; NP_001335268; NP_001335269; NP_001335270	NP_001091697; NP_058087
Location (UCSC)	Chr 8: 58.55 – 58.58 Mb	Chr 4: 6.37 – 6.41 Mb
PubMed search
- Wikidata
View/Edit Human	View/Edit Mouse

Syntenin-1 is a protein that in humans is encoded by the SDCBP gene.

== Function ==
The protein encoded by this gene was initially identified as a molecule linking syndecan-mediated signaling to the cytoskeleton. The syntenin protein contains tandemly repeated PDZ domains that bind the cytoplasmic, C-terminal domains of a variety of transmembrane proteins. This protein may also affect cytoskeletal-membrane organization, cell adhesion, protein trafficking, and the activation of transcription factors. The protein is primarily localized to membrane-associated adherens junctions and focal adhesions but is also found at the endoplasmic reticulum and nucleus. Alternative splicing results in multiple transcript variants encoding different isoforms.

== Interactions ==
SDCBP has been shown to interact with:

- EFNB1,
- GRIK1,
- GRIK2,
- Interleukin 5 receptor alpha subunit,
- Merlin,
- RAB5A,
- SOX4,
- TRAF6,
- ULK1. and
- ERICH2
