= CSF2RB =

Mammalian protein found in humans

Identifiers
- Aliases: CSF2RB, CD131, CDw131, IL3RB, IL5RB, SMDP5, colony stimulating factor 2 receptor beta common subunit, betaGMR, colony stimulating factor 2 receptor subunit beta
- External IDs: OMIM: 138981; MGI: 1339760; GeneCards: CSF2RB
Available structures
PDB	Ortholog search: PDBe RCSB
PDB	List of PDB id codes 1C8P, 1EGJ, 1GH7, 2GYS, 4NKQ, 5DWU, 2NA9, 2NA8

Gene location (Human)
Chr.	Chromosome 22 (human)
Band	22q12.3	Start	36,913,628 bp
Band	22q12.3	End	36,940,439 bp

Gene location (Mouse)
Chr.	Chromosome 15 (mouse)
Band	15 E1|15 37.22 cM	Start	78,166,707 bp
Band	15 E1|15 37.22 cM	End	78,189,921 bp
RNA expression pattern
Bgee	Human / Mouse (ortholog); Top expressed in: blood; periodontal fiber; decidua; appendix; epithelium of nasopharynx; mononuclear cell; monocyte; bone marrow; bone marrow cell; testicle / Top expressed in: mesenteric lymph nodes; granulocyte; stroma of bone marrow; subcutaneous adipose tissue; lactiferous gland; tibiofemoral joint; muscle of thigh; blood; spleen; Paneth cell; More reference expression data
BioGPS	n/a
Gene ontology
Molecular function	interleukin-3 receptor activity; interleukin-5 receptor activity; protein binding; cytokine receptor activity; protein tyrosine kinase activity; signaling receptor activity
Cellular component	integral component of membrane; membrane; plasma membrane; integral component of plasma membrane; granulocyte macrophage colony-stimulating factor receptor complex; intracellular anatomical structure
Biological process	respiratory gaseous exchange by respiratory system; MAPK cascade; signal transduction; response to lipopolysaccharide; peptidyl-tyrosine phosphorylation; interleukin-5-mediated signaling pathway; cellular response to interleukin-3; interleukin-3-mediated signaling pathway; cytokine-mediated signaling pathway
Sources:Amigo / QuickGO
Orthologs
Databases	NCBI: entry; OMA: entry
Species	Human	Mouse
Entrez	1439	12984
Ensembl	ENSG00000100368	ENSMUSG00000071714
UniProt	P32927	P26954
RefSeq (mRNA)	NM_000395	NM_001287389; NM_007781
RefSeq (protein)	NP_000386	NP_001274318; NP_031807
Location (UCSC)	Chr 22: 36.91 – 36.94 Mb	Chr 15: 78.17 – 78.19 Mb
PubMed search
- Wikidata
View/Edit Human	View/Edit Mouse

CSF2RB (also known as cytokine receptor common subunit beta) is a common subunit to the following type I cytokine receptors:

- GM-CSF receptor
- IL-3 receptor
- IL-5 receptor.
