= Alpha chain =

Subunit of a protein

The term alpha chain is normally used to indicate one of the subunits of a multi-subunit protein. The term "chain" is a general term given to any peptide sequence. It can often refer more specifically to mean:

- a part of the T-cell receptor,
- the fibrinogen alpha chain,
- the integrin alpha chain,
- Hemoglobin, alpha 1

It should be distinguished from the term alpha helix, which refers to one of the common secondary structures found in proteins, along with beta sheet.

== See also ==
- Fibrinogen
- Peptide
