= SOX4 =

Protein-coding gene in the species Homo sapiens

Identifiers
- Aliases: SOX4, EVI16, SRY-box 4, SRY-box transcription factor 4, CSS10
- External IDs: OMIM: 184430; MGI: 98366; GeneCards: SOX4
Available structures
PDB	Ortholog search: PDBe RCSB
PDB	List of PDB id codes 3U2B

Gene location (Human)
Chr.	Chromosome 6 (human)
Band	6p22.3	Start	21,593,751 bp
Band	6p22.3	End	21,598,619 bp

Gene location (Mouse)
Chr.	Chromosome 13 (mouse)
Band	13 A3.1|13 12.87 cM	Start	29,132,902 bp
Band	13 A3.1|13 12.87 cM	End	29,137,696 bp
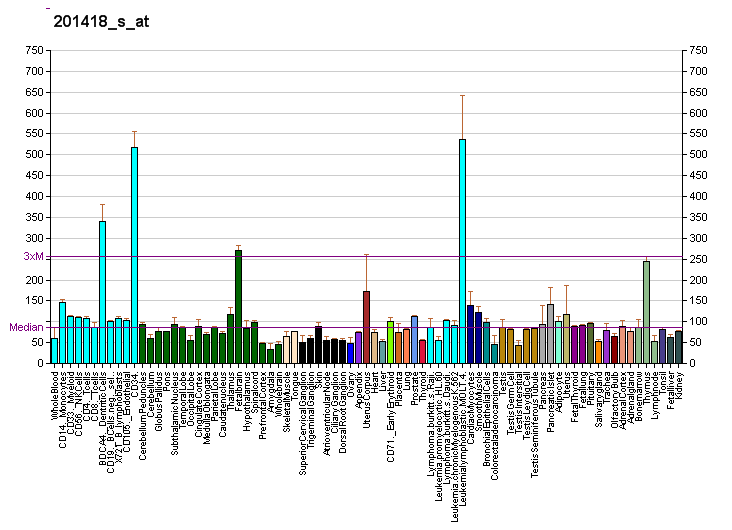

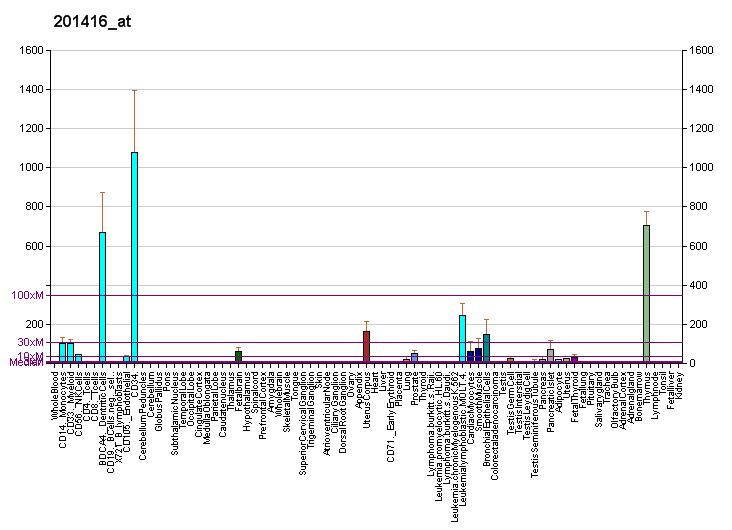

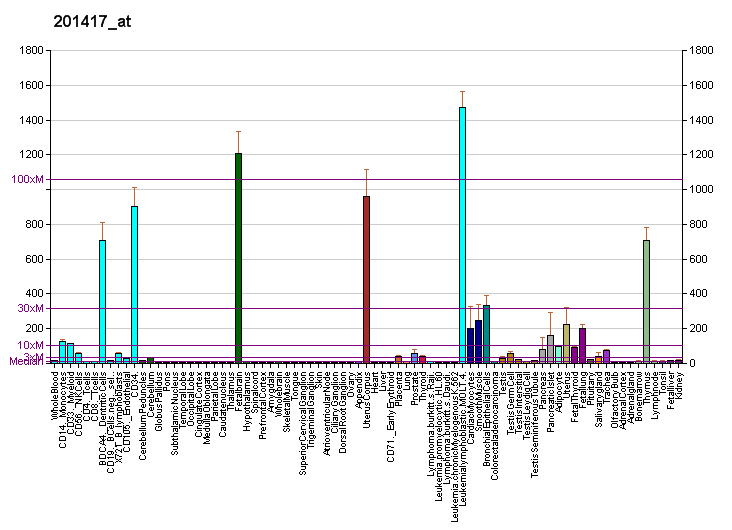
RNA expression pattern
Bgee	Human / Mouse (ortholog); Top expressed in: ganglionic eminence; ventricular zone; tendon of biceps brachii; corpus epididymis; beta cell; visceral pleura; lactiferous duct; caput epididymis; tibia; thymus / Top expressed in: medial ganglionic eminence; Rostral migratory stream; vas deferens; human fetus; Gonadal ridge; abdominal wall; mandibular prominence; maxillary prominence; superior cervical ganglion; left lung lobe; More reference expression data
BioGPS	More reference expression data
Gene ontology
Molecular function	DNA binding; transcription coactivator activity; DNA-binding transcription activator activity, RNA polymerase II-specific; transcription cis-regulatory region binding; core promoter sequence-specific DNA binding; protein binding; protein heterodimerization activity; DNA-binding transcription factor activity; DNA-binding transcription factor activity, RNA polymerase II-specific; RNA polymerase II cis-regulatory region sequence-specific DNA binding
Cellular component	cytoplasm; nucleoplasm; mitochondrion; nucleus
Biological process	skeletal system development; noradrenergic neuron differentiation; DNA damage response, signal transduction by p53 class mediator resulting in cell cycle arrest; cardiac ventricle formation; glial cell development; regulation of transcription, DNA-templated; limb bud formation; regulation of protein stability; sympathetic nervous system development; somatic stem cell population maintenance; glucose homeostasis; positive regulation of canonical Wnt signaling pathway; ventricular septum morphogenesis; protein stabilization; ascending aorta morphogenesis; negative regulation of cell death; mitral valve morphogenesis; positive regulation of translation; transcription, DNA-templated; neuroepithelial cell differentiation; positive regulation of transcription, DNA-templated; positive regulation of Wnt signaling pathway; negative regulation of protein ubiquitination; development of the heart; pro-B cell differentiation; atrial septum primum morphogenesis; T cell differentiation; kidney morphogenesis; positive regulation of cell population proliferation; spinal cord development; positive regulation of apoptotic process; glial cell proliferation; canonical Wnt signaling pathway; positive regulation of N-terminal peptidyl-lysine acetylation; spinal cord motor neuron differentiation; cardiac right ventricle morphogenesis; neural tube formation; cellular response to glucose stimulus; endocrine pancreas development; negative regulation of cell population proliferation; positive regulation of insulin secretion; positive regulation of transcription by RNA polymerase II; transcription by RNA polymerase II; cell differentiation
Sources:Amigo / QuickGO
Orthologs
Databases	NCBI: entry; OMA: entry
Species	Human	Mouse
Entrez	6659	20677
Ensembl	ENSG00000124766	ENSMUSG00000076431
UniProt	Q06945	Q06831
RefSeq (mRNA)	NM_003107	NM_009238
RefSeq (protein)	NP_003098	NP_033264
Location (UCSC)	Chr 6: 21.59 – 21.6 Mb	Chr 13: 29.13 – 29.14 Mb
PubMed search
- Wikidata
View/Edit Human	View/Edit Mouse

Transcription factor SOX-4 is a protein that in humans is encoded by the SOX4 gene.

== Function ==
This intronless gene encodes a member of the SOX (SRY-related HMG-box) family of transcription factors involved in the regulation of embryonic development and in the determination of the cell fate. The encoded protein may act as a transcriptional regulator after forming a protein complex with other proteins, such as syndecan binding protein (syntenin). The protein may function in the apoptosis pathway leading to cell death as well as to tumorigenesis and may mediate downstream effects of parathyroid hormone (PTH) and PTH-related protein (PTHrP) in bone development. The solution structure has been resolved for the HMG-box of a similar mouse protein.

Sox4 is expressed in lymphocytes (B and T) and is required for B lymphocyte development.

== Clinical significance ==
A genomic region close to the SOX4 gene has been associated with endometrial cancer development.

== Interactions ==
SOX4 has been shown to interact with SDCBP.

== See also ==
- SOX gene family
