= IWS1 =

Protein-coding gene in the species Homo sapiens

Identifiers
- Aliases: IWS1, SUPT6H interacting protein, interacts with SUPT6H, CTD assembly factor 1
- External IDs: MGI: 1920723; HomoloGene: 134421; GeneCards: IWS1; OMA:IWS1 - orthologs

Gene location (Human)
Chr.	Chromosome 2 (human)
Band	2q14.3	Start	127,436,207 bp
Band	2q14.3	End	127,526,886 bp

Gene location (Mouse)
Chr.	Chromosome 18 (mouse)
Band	18|18 B1	Start	32,200,794 bp
Band	18|18 B1	End	32,237,381 bp
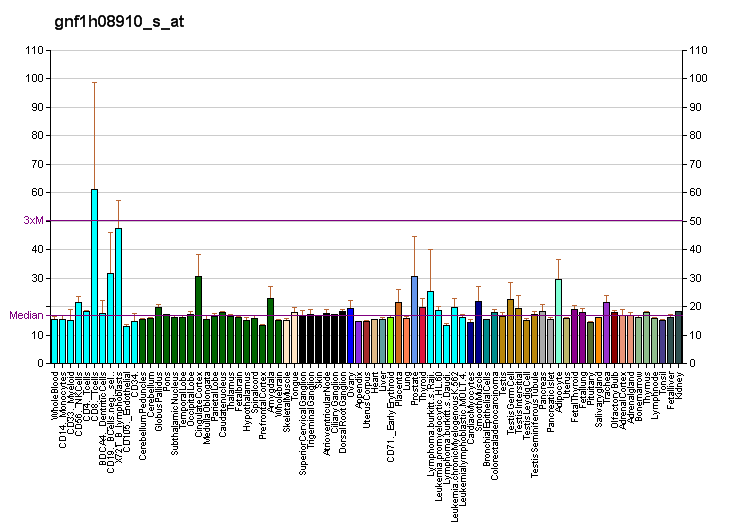

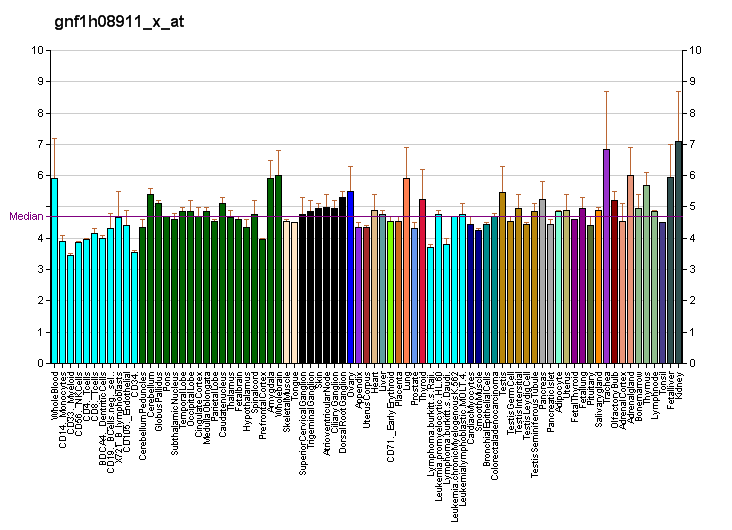

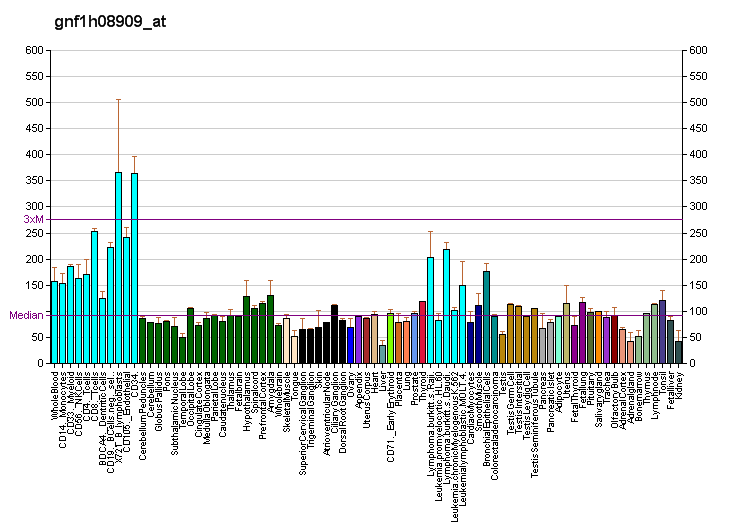
RNA expression pattern
Bgee	Human / Mouse (ortholog); Top expressed in: tibialis anterior muscle; mucosa of ileum; Achilles tendon; tendon of biceps brachii; gastrocnemius muscle; gonad; right auricle of heart; sural nerve; left ventricle; apex of heart / Top expressed in: tail of embryo; hand; otolith organ; utricle; genital tubercle; superior cervical ganglion; zygote; trigeminal ganglion; spermatocyte; spermatid; More reference expression data
BioGPS	More reference expression data
Gene ontology
Molecular function	protein binding
Cellular component	nucleus; nucleoplasm
Biological process	regulation of transcription, DNA-templated; mRNA transport; RNA splicing; regulation of histone H4 acetylation; regulation of mRNA processing; mRNA processing; regulation of mRNA export from nucleus; regulation of histone H3-K36 trimethylation; transcription, DNA-templated; transcription by RNA polymerase II; transcription elongation from RNA polymerase II promoter; regulation of DNA-templated transcription, elongation
Sources:Amigo / QuickGO
Orthologs
Species	Human	Mouse
Entrez	55677	73473
Ensembl	ENSG00000163166	ENSMUSG00000024384
UniProt	Q96ST2	Q8C1D8
RefSeq (mRNA)	NM_017969	NM_173441
RefSeq (protein)	NP_060439	NP_775617
Location (UCSC)	Chr 2: 127.44 – 127.53 Mb	Chr 18: 32.2 – 32.24 Mb
PubMed search
- Wikidata
View/Edit Human	View/Edit Mouse

Protein IWS1 homolog also known as interacts with Spt6 (IWS1) is a protein that in humans is encoded by the IWS1 gene.

IWS1 is a transcription elongation factor. It was first identified during a search for RNA polymerase II-associated elongation factors in yeast; it directly interacts with RNA polymerase II (RNAPII) and is phosphorylated at casein kinase II (CKII) sites.

The human homolog, which physically interacts with protein arginine methyltransferase 5 (PRMT5), is essential for cell survival. It also recruits a SET2 histone methyltransferase (Huntingtin-interacting protein HYPB, also known as SETD2) to RNAPII during transcription elongation and is required for H3K36 trimethylation.
