= Reslizumab =

Pharmaceutical drug

Monoclonal antibody
- Type: Whole antibody
- Source: Humanized (from rat)
- Target: IL-5

Clinical data
- Trade names: Cinqair, Cinqaero
- AHFS/Drugs.com: Monograph
- License data: US DailyMed: Reslizumab
- Routes of administration: Intravenous
- ATC code: R03DX08 (WHO)

Legal status
- Legal status: AU: S4 (Prescription only); CA: ℞-only; US: ℞-only; EU: Rx-only

Pharmacokinetic data
- Metabolism: Proteolysis
- Elimination half-life: ~24 days

Identifiers
- CAS Number: 241473-69-8
- DrugBank: DB06602
- ChemSpider: none
- UNII: 35A26E427H
- KEGG: D08985

Reslizumab, sold under the brand names Cinqair and Cinqaero, is a humanized monoclonal antibody against human interleukin-5 (IL-5). Reslizumab binds specifically to IL-5, a key cytokine responsible for the differentiation, maturation, recruitment and activation of human eosinophils. By binding to human IL-5, it blocks its biological function; consequently survival and activity of eosinophils are reduced. The benefits with reslizumab are its ability to reduce the exacerbation rate and improve lung function and asthma-related quality of life in patients with severe eosinophilic asthma (with blood eosinophil count ≥ 400 cells/μL) and with at least one previous asthma exacerbation in the preceding year. The most common side effects are increased blood creatine phosphokinase, myalgia and anaphylactic reactions.

In March 2016, the US Food and Drug Administration (FDA) approved reslizumab (Cinqair) for use with other asthma medicines for the maintenance treatment of severe asthma in people aged 18 years and older. It is approved for people who have a history of severe asthma attacks (exacerbations) despite receiving their current asthma medicines.

In June 2016, the European Medicines Agency recommended the granting of a marketing authorisation for reslizumab (Cinqaero) intended as add-on treatment in adults with severe eosinophilic asthma.

Reslizumab is supplied as a refrigerated, sterile, single-use, preservative-free solution for intravenous infusion. The reslizumab solution is a slightly hazy/opalescent, slightly yellow liquid and is supplied as 100 mg in a 10 mL glass vial. Each single-use vial of reslizumab is formulated as 10 mg/mL reslizumab in an aqueous solution containing 2.45 mg/mL sodium acetate trihydrate, 0.12 mg/mL glacial acetic acid, and 70 mg/mL sucrose, with a pH of 5.5.

== Medical uses ==
=== Eosinophilic asthma ===
Reslizumab was first used for eosinophilic asthma in 2008. In a 106-patient, phase II clinical trial, the researchers showed reslizumab was effective in reducing sputum eosinophils. Furthermore, the patients receiving reslizumab showed improvements in airway function, and a general trend toward greater asthma control than those receiving placebo was observed. A large, 981-patient, phase III clinical trial showed that reslizumab was effective at improving lung function, asthma control, and quality of life in comparison to placebo. These results led to the FDA approval for the maintenance treatment of severe asthma in patients aged 18 years and older, with an eosinophilic phenotype on March 23, 2016.

== Adverse effects ==
Common adverse effects include:

- oropharyngeal pain

Less common adverse effects include:

- musculoskeletal pain
- neck pain
- muscle spasms
- extremity pain
- muscle fatigue
- anaphylaxis
- malignancy

The most common adverse effect of reslizumab was oropharyngeal (mouth and throat) pain. According to the phase III clinical trials data, oropharyngeal pain occurred in ≥2% of individuals along with elevated baseline creatine phosphokinase (CPK), which was more common in patients treated with reslizumab versus placebo. Myalgia was also reported more in patients in the reslizumab 3 mg/kg group versus the placebo group as well as some musculoskeletal adverse reactions. Lastly, some serious adverse reactions that occurred in subjects treated with reslizumab but not in those treated with placebo included anaphylaxis and malignancy.

== Pharmacology ==
=== Mechanism of action ===
Reslizumab is an interleukin IL-5 antagonist monoclonal antibody. IL-5 is the major cytokine responsible for the growth and differentiation, recruitment, activation, and survival of eosinophils. Eosinophils play a role in the mediation of inflammation in the airways. Eosinophilic asthma is a phenotype of asthma that is characterized by the higher than normal presence of eosinophils in the lung and sputum. It has been shown that the numbers of eosinophils in the blood and bronchial fluid can correlate with asthma severity. Reslizumab binds to IL-5 with a dissociation constant of 81 pM and inhibiting IL-5 signaling, which reduces the production and survival of eosinophils. However, the mechanism of reslizumab action in asthma has not been definitively established.

=== Pharmacodynamics ===
Reductions in blood eosinophil counts were observed following the first dose of reslizumab and maintained through 52 weeks of treatment. In phase III clinical trials, mean eosinophil counts were 696 cells/μL (n=245) and 624 cells/μL (n=244) at baseline. Following 52 weeks of reslizumab treatment, eosinophil cells were counted and were reported to be 55 cells/μL (92% reduction, n=212) and 496 cells/μL (21% reduction, n=212) for the reslizumab and placebo treatment groups, respectively. Furthermore, eosinophil count returned towards baseline in those reslizumab-treated patients who completed a follow-up assessment (n=35, 480 cells/μL), approximately 120 days after the last dose of reslizumab. Therefore, reductions of blood eosinophils were related to reslizumab serum levels.

=== Pharmacokinetics ===
The pharmacokinetic characteristics of reslizumab are similar across the children and adults. Peak serum concentrations are observed at the end of infusion and declines in a biphasic manner. The mean observed accumulation ratio of reslizumab following multiple doses of administration ranged from 1.5 to 1.9-fold. Reslizumab has a volume of distribution of approximately 5 L, clearance of approximately 7 mL/hour, and a half-life of about 24 days. Reslizumab is degraded by enzymatic proteolysis into small peptides and amino acids, as are other monoclonal antibodies.

== History ==
Reslizumab was initially developed by Chuan-Chu Chou at Schering-Plough and was previously known as SCH-55700. In 1993, Chou and his group at Schering-Plough were granted the patent for the design, cloning and expression of the reslizumab drug. Ception Therapeutics acquired the drug and continued its development under the name CTx55700. In 2010, Ception Therapeutics was acquired by Cephalon for $250 million and the drug continued under development under the codename CEP-38072. In 2011, Teva Pharmaceuticals acquired Cephalon for $6.8 billion and continued the development of reslizumab.
