= Interleukin-5 receptor =

Cell surface receptors specific for interleukin-5

interleukin 5 receptor, alpha

Identifiers
- Symbol: IL5RA
- Alt. symbols: IL5R
- NCBI gene: 3568
- HGNC: 6017
- OMIM: 147851
- RefSeq: NM_175725
- UniProt: Q01344

Other data
- Locus: Chr. 3 p26-p24
Search for
- Structures: Swiss-model
- Domains: InterPro

colony stimulating factor 2 receptor, beta, low-affinity (granulocyte-macrophage)

Identifiers
- Symbol: CSF2RB
- Alt. symbols: IL3RB
- NCBI gene: 1439
- HGNC: 2436
- OMIM: 138981
- RefSeq: NM_000395
- UniProt: P32927

Other data
- Locus: Chr. 22 q12.2-13.1
Search for
- Structures: Swiss-model
- Domains: InterPro

The interleukin-5 receptor is a type I cytokine receptor. It is a heterodimer of the interleukin 5 receptor alpha subunit and CSF2RB.

The IL-5 receptor (IL-5R) belongs to the type I cytokine receptor family and is a heterodimer composed of two polypeptide chains, one α subunit, which binds IL-5 and confers upon the receptor cytokine specificity, and one β subunit, which contains the signal transduction domains.

== α-subunit ==
The IL-5Rα chain is exclusively expressed by eosinophils, some basophils and murine B1 cells or B cell precursors. Like many other cytokine receptors, alternative splicing of the α-chain gene results in expression of either a membrane bound or soluble form of the bα-chain. The soluble form does not lead to signal transduction and therefore has an antagonistic effect on IL-5 signaling. Both monomeric forms of IL-5Rα are low affinity receptors, while dimerization with the β-chain produces a high affinity receptor. In either case, the α-chain exclusively binds IL-5 and the intra-cellular portion of IL-5Rα is associated with Janus kinase (JAK) 2, a protein tyrosine-kinase essential in IL-5 signal transduction.

== β-subunit ==
The β-subunit of the IL-5 receptor is responsible for signal transduction and contains several intracellular signaling domains. Unlike the α-chain, the β-chain does not bind IL-5, is not specific to this cytokine, and is expressed on practically all leukocytes. In fact, the β-subunit of the IL-5 receptor is also found in IL-3 and GM-CSF receptors where it is associated with IL-3Rα and GM-CSFRα subunits respectively. Therefore, it is known as the common β receptor or βc. As with the IL-5Rα subunit, the β subunit’s cytoplasmic domain is constitutively associated with JAK2, as well as LYN, another tyrosine kinase, which are both essential for IL-5 signal transduction.

== Drug target ==
Three monoclonal antibodies are available to target IL-5R. Benralizumab binds to IL-5Ra, while mepolizumab and reslizumab bind to IL-5, preventing it from binding to IL-5Ra.
