= Exacerbation =

Worsening of a disease

In medicine, an exacerbation is the worsening of a disease or an increase in its symptoms. Examples includes an acute exacerbation of chronic obstructive pulmonary disease and acute exacerbation of congestive heart failure.

== See also ==
- Flare-up
