= White blood cell differential =

Blood test

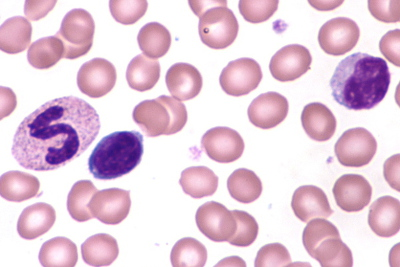
- Neutrophil (left) and lymphocytes (right) seen microscopically on a blood smear
- Synonyms: Differential leukocyte count, leukogram, autodiff, manual diff
- Purpose: Describing populations of white blood cells in peripheral blood
- MedlinePlus: 003657
- eMedicine: 2085133
- LOINC: 33255-1, 24318-8, 69738-3

A white blood cell differential is a medical laboratory test that provides information about the types and amounts of white blood cells in a person's blood. The test, which is usually ordered as part of a complete blood count (CBC), measures the amounts of the five normal white blood cell types – neutrophils, lymphocytes, monocytes, eosinophils and basophils – as well as abnormal cell types if they are present. These results are reported as percentages and absolute values, and compared against reference ranges to determine whether the values are normal, low, or high. Changes in the amounts of white blood cells can aid in the diagnosis of many health conditions, including viral, bacterial, and parasitic infections and blood disorders such as leukaemia.

White blood cell differentials may be performed by an automated analyzer – a machine designed to run laboratory tests – or manually, by examining blood smears under a microscope. The test was performed manually until white blood cell differential analyzers were introduced in the 1970s, making the automated differential possible. In the automated differential, a blood sample is loaded onto an analyzer, which samples a small volume of blood and measures various properties of white blood cells to produce a differential count. The manual differential, in which white blood cells are counted on a stained microscope slide, is now performed to investigate abnormal results from the automated differential, or upon request by the healthcare provider. The manual differential can identify cell types that are not counted by automated methods and detect clinically significant changes in the appearance of white blood cells.

In 1674, Antonie van Leeuwenhoek published the first microscopic observations of blood cells. Improvements in microscope technology throughout the 18th and 19th centuries allowed the three cellular components of blood to be identified and counted. In the 1870s, Paul Ehrlich invented a staining technique that could differentiate between each type of white blood cell. Dmitri Leonidovich Romanowsky later modified Ehrlich's stain to produce a wider range of colours, creating the Romanowsky stain, which is still used to stain blood smears for manual differentials.

Automation of the white blood cell differential began with the invention of the Coulter counter, the first automated hematology analyzer, in the early 1950s. This machine used electrical impedance measurements to count cells and determine their sizes, allowing white and red blood cells to be enumerated. In the 1970s, two techniques were developed for performing automated differential counts: digital image processing of microscope slides and flow cytometry techniques using light scattering and cell staining. These methods remain in use on modern hematology analyzers.

== Overview ==
Example of WBC differential reference ranges
Cell type	Adult reference range (× 10^{9}/L)	Adult reference range (percentage)
Neutrophils	1.7–7.5	50–70
Lymphocytes	1.0–3.2	18–42
Monocytes	0.1–1.3	2–11
Eosinophils	0.0–0.3	1–3
Basophils	0.0–0.2	0–2

The white blood cell differential is a common blood test that is often ordered alongside a complete blood count. The test may be performed as part of a routine medical examination; to investigate certain symptoms, particularly those suggestive of infection or hematological disorders; or to monitor existing conditions, such as blood disorders and inflammatory diseases.

Five types of white blood cells are normally found in blood: neutrophils, lymphocytes, monocytes, eosinophils and basophils. Marked shifts in the proportions of these cell types, as measured by the automated or manual differential, can indicate various health conditions. Additionally, cell types which do not normally occur in the blood, such as blast cells, can be identified by the manual differential. These cell types may be found in blood disorders and other pathological states. The manual differential can also identify changes in the appearance of white blood cells, such as reactive lymphocytes, or features such as toxic granulation and vacuolation in neutrophils. The results of the white blood cell differential are reported as percentages and absolute values. Absolute counts are usually reported in units of cells per microlitre (μL) or 10^{9} cells per litre (L). The result are then compared against reference ranges, which are defined by individual laboratories and may vary due to different patient populations and testing methods.

CBC and differential testing is usually performed on venous or capillary blood. Capillary blood draws are generally used for infants and individuals whose veins are difficult to access. To prevent clotting, the sample is drawn into a tube containing the anticoagulant compound ethylenediaminetetraacetic acid (EDTA), meaning blood that has not been centrifuged.

== Types ==
=== Manual differential ===
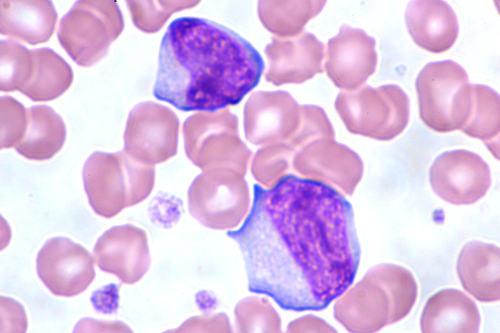
The manual differential technique allows cells to be classified based on subtle changes in appearance, as in these reactive lymphocytes seen in a person with infectious mononucleosis.

In a manual differential, a stained blood smear is examined under a microscope and white blood cells are counted and classified based on their appearance. A manual differential is usually performed when the automated differential is flagged for review or when the healthcare provider requests it. If the manual differential shows findings suggestive of certain serious conditions, such as leukaemia, the blood smear is referred to a physician (generally a hematologist or pathologist) for confirmation.

==== Procedure ====
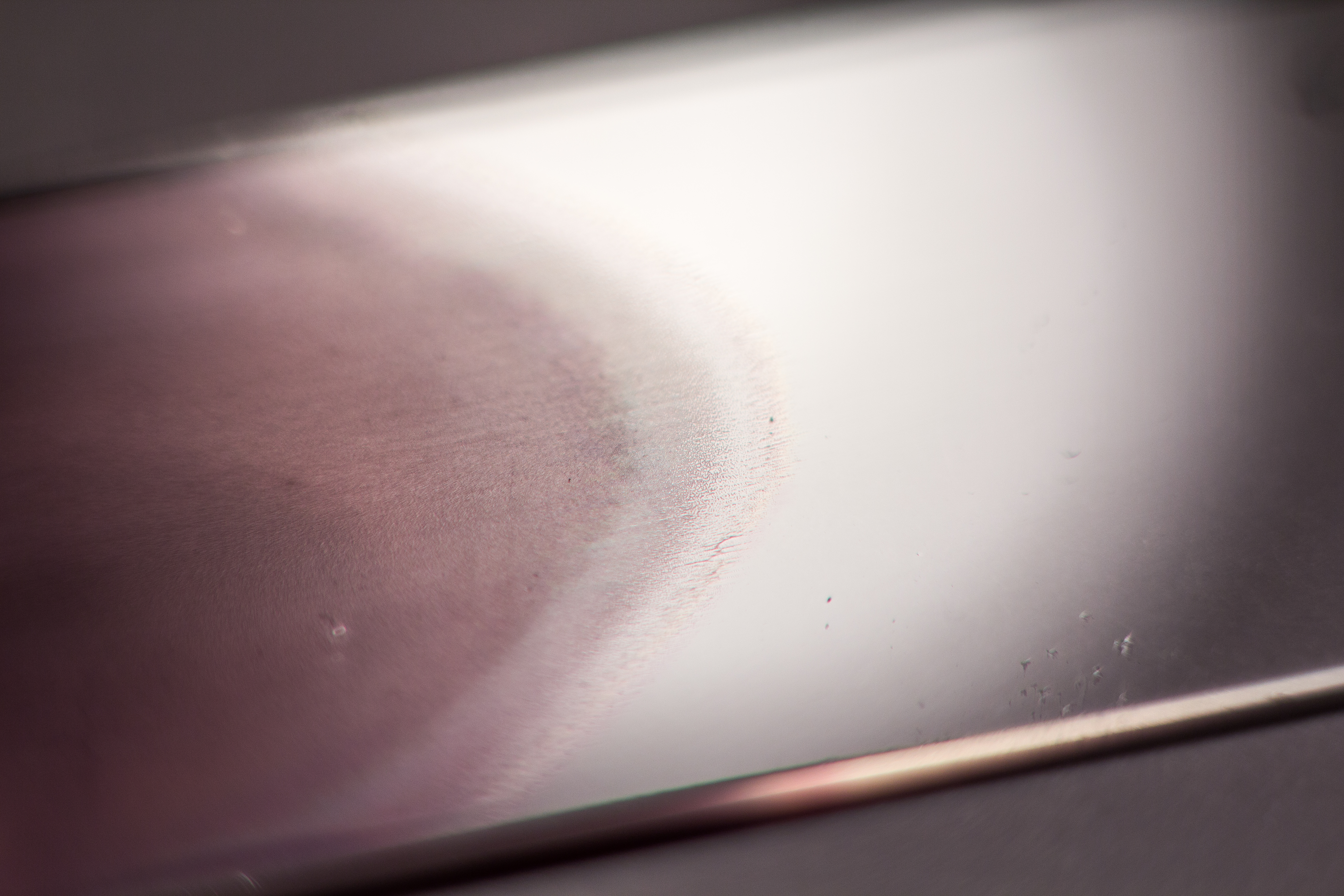
Closeup of the feathered edge of a stained blood smear

A blood smear is prepared by placing a drop of blood on a microscope slide and using a second slide held at an angle to spread the blood and pull it across the slide, forming a "feathered edge" consisting of a single layer of cells at the end of the smear. This may be done by hand or using an automated slide maker coupled to a hematology analyzer. The slide is treated with a Romanowsky stain, commonly Wright's stain or Wright-Giemsa, and examined under the microscope. The smear is examined in a systematic pattern, scanning from side to side within the feathered edge and counting cells consecutively. The differential is typically performed at 400x or 500x magnification, but 1000x magnification may be used if abnormal cells are present. Cells are identified based on their morphologic features, such as the size and structure of their nucleus and the colour and texture of their cytoplasm. This allows abnormal cell types and changes in cellular appearance to be identified. In most cases, the microscopist counts 100 white blood cells, but 200 may be counted for better representation if the white blood cell count is high. The manual differential count produces percentages of each cell type, which can be multiplied by the total white blood cell count from the analyzer to derive the absolute values.

The manual differential can be partially automated with digital microscopy software, which uses artificial intelligence to classify white blood cells from photomicrographs of the blood smear. However, this technique requires confirmation by manual review.

==== Limitations ====
Because relatively few cells are counted in the manual differential, the variability is higher than in automated techniques, especially when cells are present in low amounts. For example, in a sample containing 5 percent monocytes, the manual differential results could be between 1 and 10 percent due to sampling variation. Additionally, cell identification is subjective and the accuracy depends on the skills of the person reading the slide. Poor blood smear preparation can cause an uneven distribution of white blood cells, resulting in inaccurate counting, and improper staining can impede cell identification. Overall, manual differential counts exhibit coefficients of variation (CVs) ranging from 5 to 10 percent, while automated differential counts of normal neutrophils and lymphocytes have CVs of about 3 percent.

In leukemias and other hematologic malignancies, the lineage and genetic characteristics of white blood cells have important implications for treatment and prognosis, and the microscopic appearance of the cells is often insufficient for accurate classification. In these cases, other techniques such as immunophenotyping by flow cytometry or special staining can be used to definitively identify the cells.

=== Automated differential ===
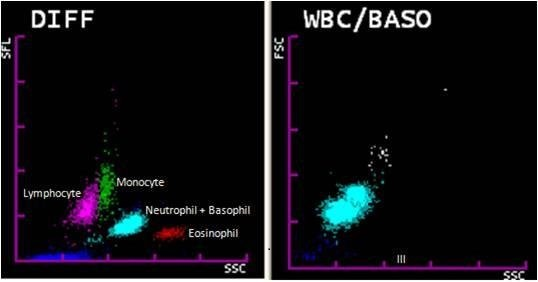
Example of a white blood cell differential scattergram: differently coloured clusters indicate different cell populations

Most hematology analyzers provide a five-part differential, enumerating neutrophils, lymphocytes, monocytes, eosinophils and basophils. Some instruments can also count immature granulocytes and nucleated red blood cells. If a six-part differential is provided, the IG or immature granulocyte category consists of promyelocytes, myelocytes and metamyelocytes. Hematology analyzers measure various properties of white blood cells, such as impedance, light scattering parameters, and staining reactions. This data is analyzed and plotted on a scattergram, forming distinct clusters which correspond to white blood cell types. The analyzer counts many more cells than are counted in a manual differential, resulting in improved precision. If abnormal features or cell populations that the analyzer cannot identify are present, the instrument can flag the results for manual blood smear review.

==== Procedure ====
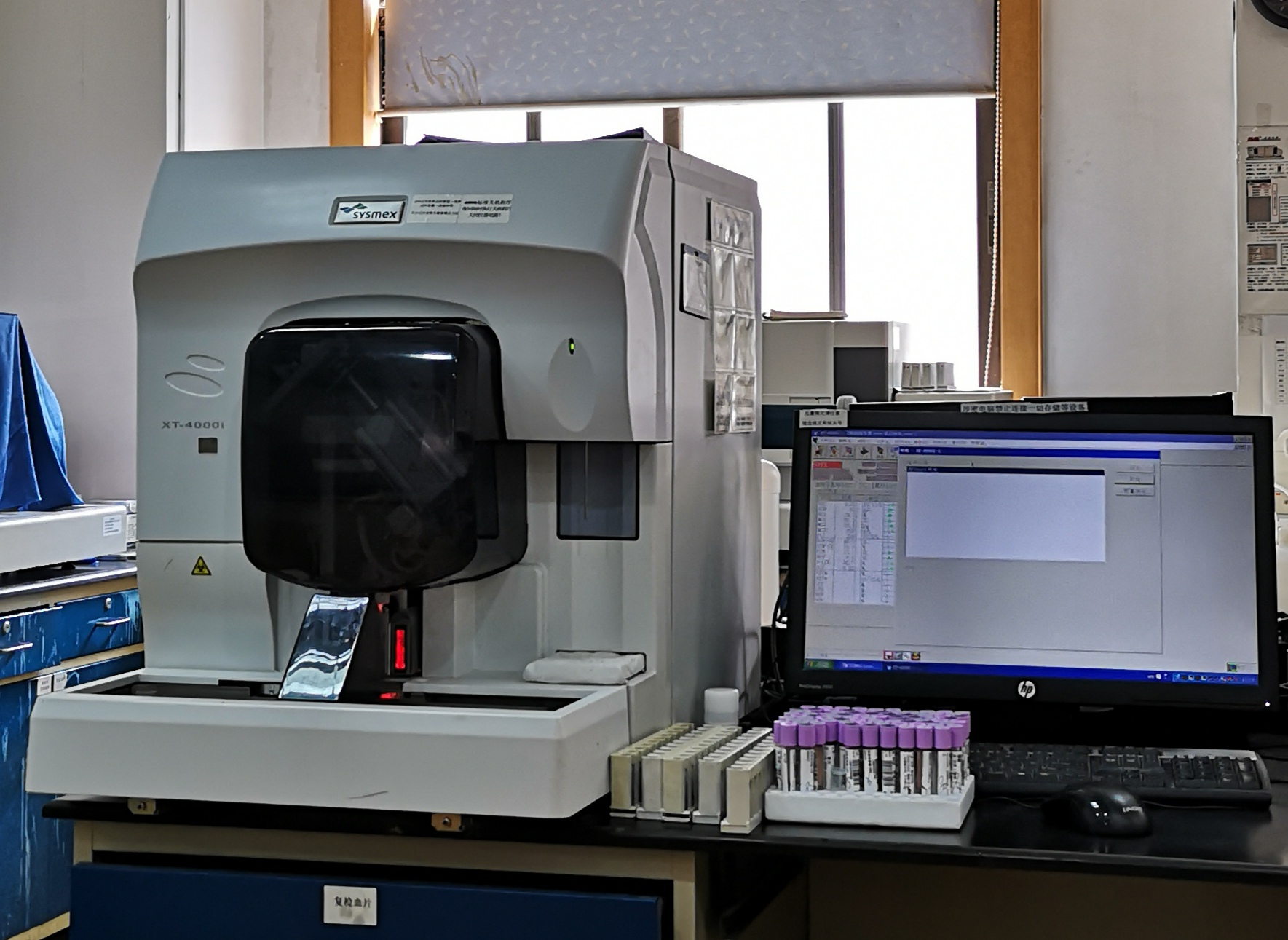
An automated hematology analyzer (Sysmex XT-4000i)

Common techniques used by hematology analyzers to identify cells include light scattering, Coulter counting, and cytochemical staining techniques. Some analyzers also use radiofrequency analysis and monoclonal antibody tagging to identify cells. Staining techniques used in differential analyzers include staining of myeloperoxidase, an enzyme found in cells of myeloid lineage, and nucleic acids, which are found in higher concentrations in immature cells.

A small volume of blood (as low as 150 microlitres) is aspirated into the analyzer, where reagents are applied to lyse red blood cells and preserve white blood cells. The sample is diluted and passed into a flow cell, which uses hydrodynamic focusing to isolate single cells for accurate analysis of their properties. Various cellular parameters, such as size, complexity and staining reactions, are measured and analyzed to identify cell populations. Basophils are often quantified using a reagent that lyses the cytoplasm of other white blood cells but leaves basophils intact. Samples that have abnormal results or are suspected to contain abnormal cells are flagged by the analyzer for manual blood smear review.

To ensure that results from the automated analyzer are correct, quality control samples are run at least once per day. These are samples with known results that are most often provided by the instrument manufacturer. Laboratories compare their differential results to the known values to ensure the instrument is operating correctly. A moving average measurement may also be used, in which the average results for patient samples are measured at certain intervals. Assuming that the characteristics of the patient population remain roughly the same over time, the average should remain constant. Large shifts in the average value can indicate instrument problems.

==== Limitations ====
When immature or abnormal white blood cells are present, automated differential results may be incorrect, necessitating a manual blood smear review. Overall, 10 to 25 percent of CBC samples are flagged for manual review by the analyzer. Although most abnormal samples are automatically flagged, some may be missed; conversely, analyzers may generate false positive flags when no abnormal cells are present. Hematology laboratories compensate for these issues by requiring a smear review when differential or CBC results fall outside certain numerical thresholds, regardless of the presence of analyzer flags. The sensitivity and specificity of analyzer flagging can be determined by comparing analyzer flags to manual differential results.

The automated basophil count is notoriously unreliable, often underestimating counts in basophilia and producing falsely elevated results in the presence of abnormal cells. The manual differential is therefore considered the reference method for these cells.

Analyzers may count nucleated red blood cells, giant and clumped platelets, and red blood cells containing abnormal hemoglobins (such as Hemoglobin S in sickle cell disease) as white blood cells, leading to faulty differential results. Automated differential counts on aged specimens may be incorrect due to cellular degeneration.

== Cell types and result interpretation ==
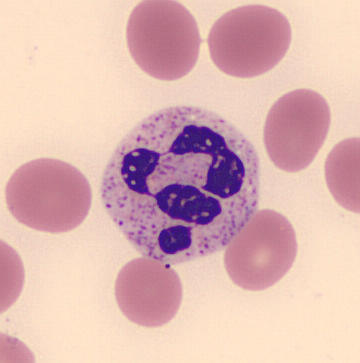

Neutrophil
Neutrophils are the most common white blood cells in normal adult blood. When stained with a Romanowsky stain, they exhibit a multi-lobed nucleus and pink cytoplasm that contains small purple granules.

The neutrophil count is normally higher in newborns and pregnant women than in other groups. Outside of these conditions, increased neutrophil counts (neutrophilia) are associated with bacterial infection, inflammation, and various forms of physiological stress. Neutrophil counts can become extremely high in response to some infections and inflammatory states, which is termed leukemoid reaction because the high white blood cell count mimics leukaemia. Neutrophilia may also occur in myeloproliferative disorders.
Neutropenia, meaning a low neutrophil count, may occur as a response to drug treatment (especially chemotherapy) or in certain infections, such as tuberculosis and Gram-negative sepsis. Neutropenia also occurs in many hematologic disorders, such as leukaemia and myelodysplastic syndrome, and in a variety of autoimmune and congenital diseases. A neutrophil count below the reference interval may be normal in individuals of certain ethnicities; this is termed benign ethnic neutropenia. Very low neutrophil counts are associated with immunosuppression.

When stimulated by infection or inflammation, neutrophils may develop abnormal features in their cytoplasm, such as toxic granulation, toxic vacuolation and Döhle bodies. These features, which are caused by the release of cytokines, are collectively known as toxic changes.

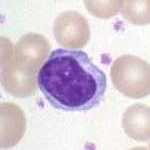

Lymphocyte
Lymphocytes, which are the second most common type of white blood cell in adults, are typically small cells with a round, dark nucleus and a thin strip of pale blue cytoplasm. Some lymphocytes are larger and contain a few blue granules.

Increased lymphocyte counts (lymphocytosis) can be caused by viral infections and may also occur after splenectomy. Children have higher lymphocyte counts than adults. Chronic lymphocytic leukaemia presents with an elevated lymphocyte count and abnormal lymphocyte morphology, in which the lymphocytes have extremely dense, clumped nuclei and some cells appear smudged on the blood smear.
Low lymphocyte counts (lymphopenia) may be seen in infections such as HIV/AIDS, influenza and viral hepatitis, as well as in protein-energy malnutrition, acute illnesses and drug reactions.

In response to viral infections (especially infectious mononucleosis), lymphocytes may increase greatly in size, developing unusually shaped nuclei and large amounts of dark blue cytoplasm. Such cells are referred to as reactive or atypical lymphocytes and when present they are either commented on or counted separately from normal lymphocytes in the manual differential.

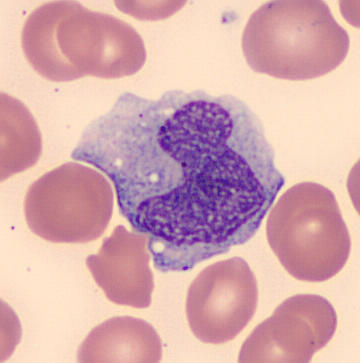

Monocyte
Monocytes are large cells with a curved or folded nucleus and finely granulated, grey-blue cytoplasm that often contains vacuoles. Monocytes are the third most common white blood cell after neutrophils and lymphocytes.

Increased monocyte counts (monocytosis) are seen in chronic infection and inflammation. Extremely high monocyte counts, as well as immature forms of monocytes, occur in chronic myelomonocytic leukaemia and acute leukemias of monocytic origin. Monocyte counts may be decreased (monocytopenia) in individuals who are receiving chemotherapy as well as those with aplastic anemia, severe burns, and AIDS.

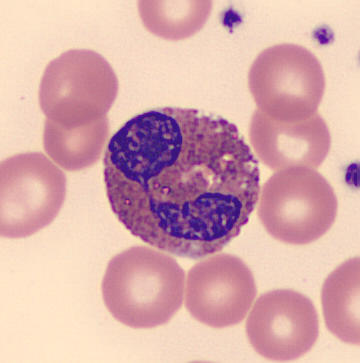

Eosinophil
Eosinophils have large orange granules in their cytoplasm and bi-lobed nuclei. They are found in low amounts in normal blood.

Elevated eosinophil counts (eosinophilia) are associated with allergic reactions, parasitic infections, and asthma. Eosinophil counts may be decreased in pregnancy and in response to physiological stress, inflammation or treatment with certain drugs, such as steroids and epinephrine.

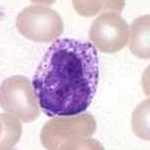

Basophil
Basophils exhibit large, dark purple granules that often cover the cell's nucleus. They are the rarest of the five normal cell types.

Basophilia and eosinophilia can occur along with other white blood cell abnormalities in chronic myeloid leukaemia and other myeloproliferative disorders. An increased basophil count may also be seen in hypersensitivity reactions and after splenectomy. The basophil count may decrease during ovulation, steroid treatment, and periods of physiological stress.

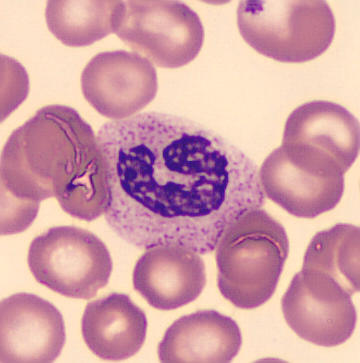

Band neutrophil
Band neutrophils are young forms of neutrophils which lack segmentation of the nucleus. These cells, which are identified by manual counting, are found in low numbers in normal adult blood.

A left shift, meaning an increase in band neutrophils or immature granulocytes, can indicate infection, inflammation or bone marrow disorders, although it can also be a normal finding in pregnancy. Some laboratories do not separate bands from mature neutrophils in the differential count because the classification is highly subjective and unreliable.

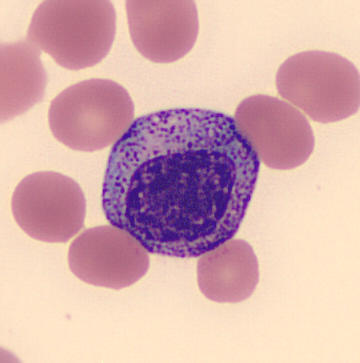

Immature granulocyte
Immature granulocytes are immature forms of neutrophils and other granulocytes (eosinophils and basophils). This classification consists of metamyelocytes, myelocytes and promyelocytes, which may be enumerated separately in the manual differential or reported together as immature granulocytes (IG) by automated methods. Immature granulocytes are normally found in the bone marrow, but not in peripheral blood.

When present in significant quantities in the blood, immature granulocytes can indicate infection and inflammation, as well as myeloproliferative disease, leukaemia and other conditions affecting the marrow. IGs may also be increased in steroid use and pregnancy. Chronic myeloid leukaemia often presents with a high number of immature granulocytes in the peripheral blood. Abnormal promyelocytes with multiple Auer rods, called faggot cells, occur in acute promyelocytic leukaemia.

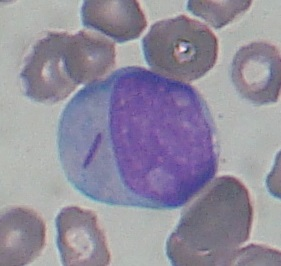

Blast cell
Blast cells are very immature cells that are normally found in the bone marrow, where they develop into mature cells (hematopoiesis) before being released into the blood. They can be identified by their large overall size, deep blue cytoplasm, and large nucleus with fine chromatin and prominent nucleoli.

When seen on the blood smear, blast cells are an abnormal finding and may be indicative of acute leukaemia or other serious blood disorders. Rarely, they may be seen in severe cases of left shift. The presence of Auer rods inside blast cells indicates that they are of myeloid origin, which has important implications for leukaemia treatment. Other morphologic features can provide information about the lineage of blast cells: for example, myeloblasts tend to be large with distinct nucleoli, while lymphoblasts can be smaller with a denser chromatin pattern. However, these features are not diagnostic, and flow cytometry or special staining is generally used to confirm the lineage.

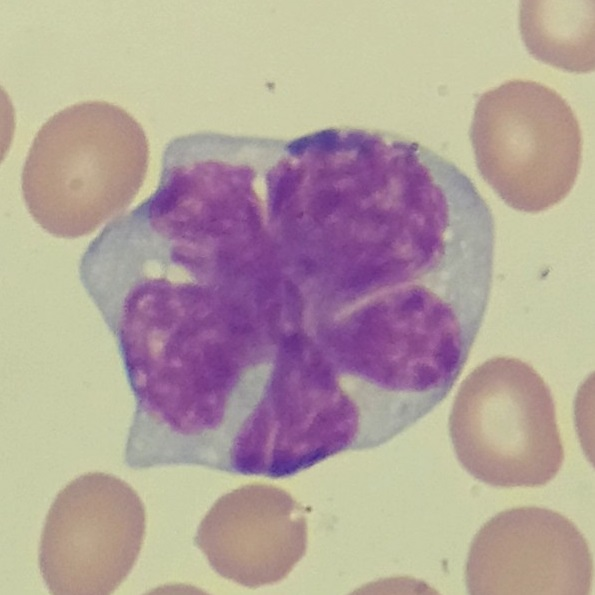

Other cells
Various other abnormal cells may be present in the blood in certain conditions. For example, lymphoma cells may be found on the manual differential in some cases of lymphoma, and in mast cell leukaemia, mast cells, which are normally confined to tissue, circulate in the blood. There is a very rare phenomenon called carcinocythemia in which tumour cells are seen on the peripheral blood smear.

== History ==
Before automated cell counters were introduced, cell counts were performed manually; white and red blood cells, and platelets were counted using microscopes. The first person to publish microscopic observations of blood cells was Antonie van Leeuwenhoek, who reported on the appearance of red cells in a 1674 letter to the Proceedings of the Royal Society of London; Jan Swammerdam had described red blood cells some years earlier, but had not published his findings at the time. Throughout the 18th and 19th centuries, improvements in microscope technology such as achromatic lenses allowed white blood cells and platelets to be counted in unstained samples. In the 1870s, Paul Ehrlich developed a staining technique that could differentiate between the five white blood cell types. Ehrlich's stain used a combination of an acidic and basic dye to stain white and red blood cells simultaneously. Dmitri Leonidovich Romanowsky improved on this technique in the 1890s by using a mixture of eosin and aged methylene blue, which produced a wide range of hues that was not present when either of the stains was used alone. This was termed the Romanowsky effect and became the basis for Romanowsky staining, the technique that is still used to stain blood smears for manual differentials.

By the early years of the 20th century, the white blood cell differential had become a common practice in the United States, but difficulties in interpreting the results cast doubt on the test's utility. In 1906, Charles Langdon Gibson introduced the Gibson chart, which compared the total white blood cell count against the neutrophil count to distinguish between "pyogenic" and "non-pyogenic" conditions and to predict the severity of infections. Around the same time, Josef Arneth proposed a system of classifying neutrophils by their number of nuclear lobes – termed the "lobe index" or Arneth count – and established a set of reference ranges for neutrophil lobularity. Arneth's analysis of neutrophil segmentation was later found to have limited clinical significance, but the association of hypersegmented neutrophils with vitamin B12 and folate deficiency remains accepted. Viktor Schilling in 1912 proposed a different classification of neutrophils, separating them into "myelozyten, jugendliche, stabkernige and segmentkernige" – that is, myelocytes, "juveniles" (metamyelocytes), band neutrophils (sometimes called "stabs"), and mature, fully segmented neutrophils – and remarked on the clinical significance of the neutrophilic left shift in conjunction with the white blood cell count and the presence of toxic changes. Schilling's monograph, Das Blutbild und seine klinische Verwertung (The Blood Picture and its Clinical Significance), was translated into English in 1926, and his neutrophil classification system quickly found acceptance in American laboratories.

The first automated hematology analyzer, the Coulter counter, was invented in the early 1950s by Wallace H. Coulter. The analyzer worked on the Coulter principle, which states that when cells are suspended in a fluid carrying an electric current and passed through an aperture, they cause decreases in current proportional to their volume because of their poor electrical conductivity. The number and magnitude of these decreases can be used to count blood cells and calculate their sizes. The Coulter counter was initially designed for counting red blood cells, but it proved effective for counting white blood cells as well.

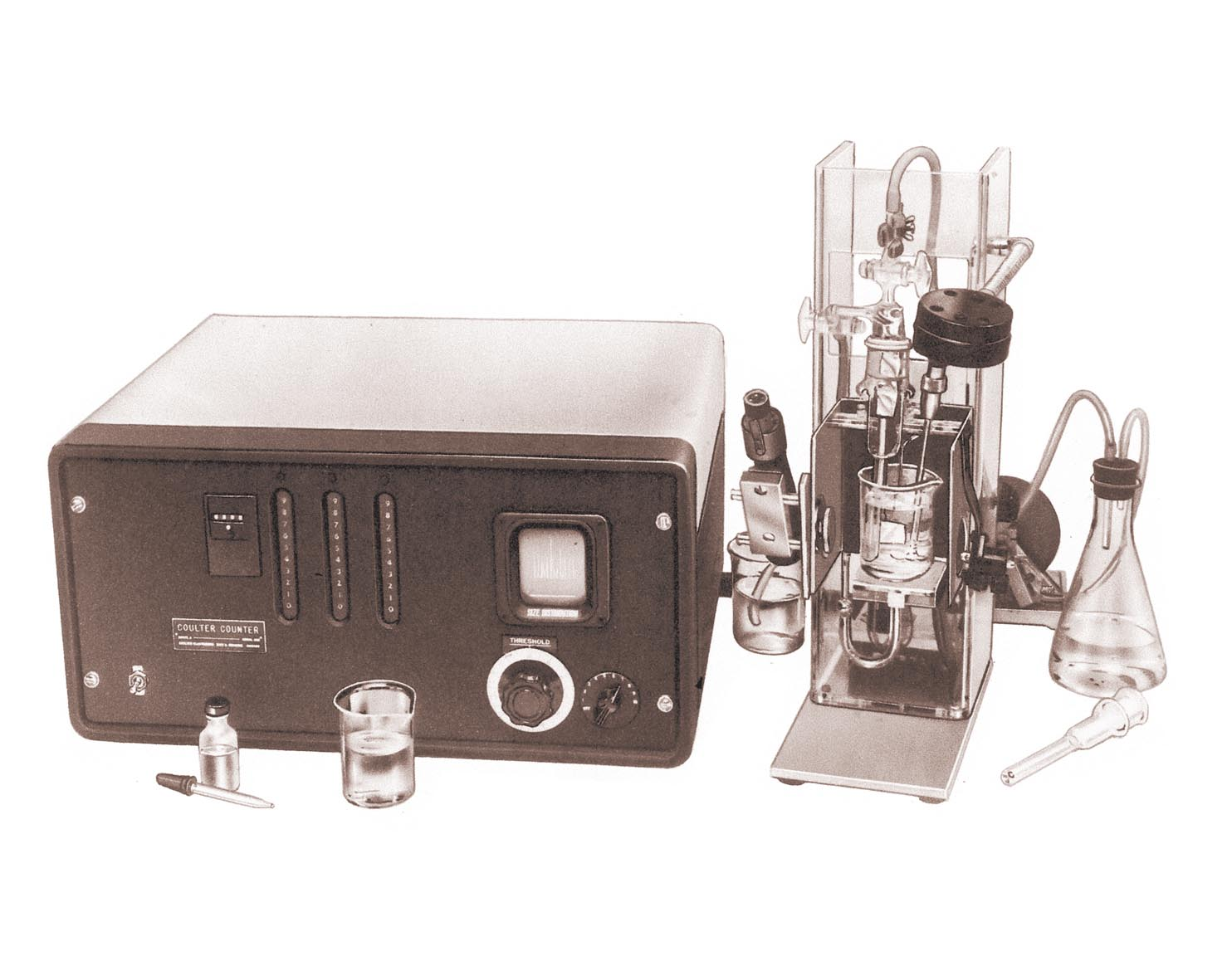
The Model A Coulter counter, the first commercial hematology analyzer

After basic cell counting had been automated, the white blood cell differential remained a challenge. Research into automating the differential count began in the 1970s and took two main approaches: digital image processing and flow cytometry. Using technology developed in the 1950s and 60s to automate the reading of Pap smears, several models of image processing analyzers were produced. These instruments would scan a stained blood smear to find cell nuclei, then take a higher resolution snapshot of the cell to analyze it through densitometry. They were expensive, slow, and did little to reduce workload in the laboratory because they still required blood smears to be prepared and stained, so flow cytometry-based systems became more popular, and by 1990, no digital image analyzers were commercially available in the United States or western Europe. These techniques enjoyed a resurgence in the 2000s with the introduction of more advanced image analysis platforms using artificial neural networks.

Early flow cytometry devices shot beams of light at cells in specific wavelengths and measured the resulting absorbance, fluorescence or light scatter, collecting information about the cells' features and allowing cellular contents such as DNA to be quantified. One such instrument—the Rapid Cell Spectrophotometer, developed by Louis Kamentsky in 1965 to automate cervical cytology—could generate blood cell scattergrams using cytochemical staining techniques. Leonard Ornstein, who had helped to develop the staining system on the Rapid Cell Spectrophotometer, and his colleagues later created the first commercial flow cytometric white blood cell differential analyzer, the Hemalog D. Introduced in 1974, this analyzer used light scattering, absorbance and cell staining to identify the five normal white blood cell types in addition to "large unidentified cells", a classification that usually consisted of atypical lymphocytes or blast cells. The Hemalog D could count 10,000 cells in one run, a marked improvement over the manual differential. By 1977 it was estimated that "at least 200" automated differential analyzers were in use throughout the world. In 1981, Technicon combined the Hemalog D with the Hemalog-8 analyzer to produce the Technicon H6000, the first combined complete blood count and differential analyzer. This analyzer was unpopular with hematology laboratories because it was labour-intensive to operate, but in the late 1980s to early 1990s similar systems were widely produced by other manufacturers such as Sysmex, Abbott, Roche and Beckman Coulter.

== See also ==
- Flow cytometry
- Cell counting

== Bibliography ==
- Bain, Barbara; Bates, Imelda; Laffan, Mike (2012). Dacie and Lewis practical haematology. Edinburgh: Elsevier Churchill Livingstone. ISBN 978-0-7020-3407-7. OCLC 780445109.
- Ciesla, Betty (27 November 2018). Hematology in Practice. F.A. Davis. ISBN 978-0-8036-6825-6.
- Gibbs, Bernhard (2014). "The absolute basophil count". Basophils and mast cells : methods and protocols. New York, NY: Humana Press. ISBN 978-1-4939-1172-1. OCLC 889943963.
- Glassy, Eric F. (1998). Color Atlas of Hematology: An Illustrated Field Guide Based on Proficiency Testing. College of American Pathologists. ISBN 978-0-930304-66-9.
- Groner, W (1995). Practical Guide to Modern Hematology Analyzers. Wiley. ISBN 978-0-471-95712-6.
- Greer, John P.; Arber, Daniel A.; Glader, Bertil E.; List, Alan F.; Means, Robert M.; Rodgers, George M. (19 November 2018). Wintrobe's Clinical Hematology (14th ed.). Wolters Kluwer Health. ISBN 978-1-4963-6713-6.
- Harmening, Denise (2009). Clinical Hematology and Fundamentals of Hemostasis (5th ed.). F. A. Davis Company. ISBN 978-0-8036-1732-2.
- Hematology and Clinical Microscopy Committee (2019). "Blood cell identification" (PDF). Hematology and Clinical Microscopy Glossary. College of American Pathologists. Archived (PDF) from the original on 28 June 2019.
- Hoffman, Ronald; Benz Jr., Edward J.; Silberstein, Leslie E.; Heslop, Helen; Anastasi, John; Weitz, Jeffrey (2013). Hematology: Basic Principles and Practice (6th ed.). Elsevier Health Sciences. ISBN 978-1-4377-2928-3. OCLC 818729856.
- Keohane, Elaine; Smith, Larry; Walenga, Jeanine (2015). Rodak's Hematology: Clinical Principles and Applications (5th ed.). Elsevier Health Sciences. ISBN 978-0-323-23906-6. OCLC 906612363.
- Koepke, JA (1977). Differential leukocyte counting. College of American Pathologists. ISBN 0-930304-12-8. OCLC 630220779.
- Kottke-Marchant, Kandice; Davis, Bruce (2012). Laboratory Hematology Practice. Wiley. ISBN 978-1-4443-9857-1. OCLC 897540174.
- McCann, SR (2016). A History of Haematology: From Herodotus to HIV. OUP Oxford. ISBN 978-0-19-102713-0. OCLC 967259005.
- McClatchey, Kenneth D. (2002). "40. Peripheral blood and bone marrow assessment". Clinical Laboratory Medicine (6th ed.). Lippincott Williams & Wilkins. ISBN 978-0-683-30751-1. OCLC 56607136.
- Melamed, Myron (2001). "1. A brief history of flow cytometry and sorting". Methods in Cell Biology. Vol. 63 part A. Elsevier. pp. 3–17. doi:10.1016/S0091-679X(01)63005-X. ISBN 9780125441667. PMID 11060834.
- Naeim, Faramarz; Rao, P. Nagesh; Grody, Wayne W. (2009). Hematopathology: Morphology, Immunophenotype, Cytogenetics, and Molecular Approaches. Academic Press. ISBN 978-0-08-091948-5. OCLC 968991527.
- d'Onofrio, Giuseppe; Zini, Gina (2014). "Acute Myeloid Leukaemia". Morphology of Blood Disorders (2nd ed.). Wiley. p. 289. ISBN 978-1-118-44258-6. OCLC 889324204.
- Shapiro, Howard (2003). Practical Flow Cytometry (4th ed.). Wiley. ISBN 978-0-471-43403-0. OCLC 535982003.
- Pereira, Irma; George, Tracy I.; Arber, Daniel A. (2011). "20. Nonhematopoietic tumors in the blood". Atlas of Peripheral Blood: The Primary Diagnostic Tool. Lippincott Williams & Wilkins. ISBN 978-1-4511-6366-7. OCLC 1316010974.
- Porwit, Anna; McCullough, Jeffrey; Erber, Wendy N (2011). Blood and Bone Marrow Pathology (2nd ed.). Elsevier Health Sciences. ISBN 978-0-7020-4535-6. OCLC 787843904.
- Warekois, Robin S.; Robinson, Richard (2013). Phlebotomy: Worktext and Procedures Manual (3rd ed.). Elsevier Health Sciences. ISBN 978-0-323-29284-9. OCLC 1017790816.
- Turgeon, ML (2016). Linné & Ringsrud's Clinical Laboratory Science: Concepts, Procedures, and Clinical Applications (7th ed.). Elsevier Mosby. ISBN 978-0-323-22545-8. OCLC 921939675.
- Wang, Sa A.; Hasserjian, Robert P. (2018). Diagnosis of Blood and Bone Marrow Disorders. Springer. ISBN 978-3-319-20279-2.10.1007/978-3-319-20279-2
- Wintrobe, MM (1985). Hematology, the Blossoming of a Science: A Story of Inspiration and Effort. Lea & Febiger. ISBN 978-0-8121-0961-0. OCLC 565182546.
