= Carcinocythemia =

Tumour cells on blood smear

- Other names: Carcinoma cell leukemia
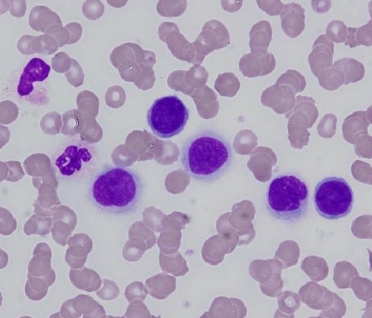
- A case of carcinocythemia. The large, round cells are breast cancer cells circulating in the peripheral blood.
- Specialty: Hematology, oncology
- Causes: Usually secondary to metastatic cancer in the bone marrow
- Differential diagnosis: Acute leukemia, lymphoma, leukemoid reaction, circulating immature cells from chemotherapy, circulating endothelial cells, megakaryocytes or osteoclasts
- Prognosis: Poor; 15% survival rate at 6 months

Carcinocythemia, also known as carcinoma cell leukemia, is a condition in which cells from malignant tumours of non-hematopoietic origin are visible on the peripheral blood smear. It is an extremely rare condition, with 33 cases identified in the literature from 1960 to 2018. Carcinocythemia typically occurs secondary to infiltration of the bone marrow by metastatic cancer and carries a very poor prognosis.

== Presentation ==
Carcinocythemia occurs most commonly in breast cancer, followed by small cell lung cancer, and usually appears late in the course of the disease. Thrombosis and disseminated intravascular coagulation are frequently reported in association with carcinocythemia. The prognosis is poor: a review of 26 patients found that 85% died within 6 months of the diagnosis, with an average time of 6.1 weeks between diagnosis and death.

The amount of tumour cells on the blood smear can range from 1 to 80 percent of the total white blood cell count, with lower percentages being more common. Carcinocythemia is distinct from the presence of circulating tumour cells (CTCs), as CTCs usually occur in such low quantities that they cannot be seen on blood smear examination, requiring special techniques for detection.

== Mechanism ==
The mechanism of carcinocythemia is poorly understood. Some patients with carcinocythemia show evidence of impaired spleen function, and it has been suggested that dysfunction of the reticuloendothelial system, preventing phagocytosis of malignant cells, could contribute to the presence of tumour cells in the blood.

== Diagnosis ==
Carcinocythemia can be detected on a routine blood smear examination or manual differential. If the number of suspicious cells is low, a smear can be prepared from the buffy coat of the blood sample to concentrate the cells.

Tumour cells in peripheral blood may look similar to circulating blasts or lymphoma cells. Features that aid in distinguishing tumour cells from other cells include their very large size, mature nuclear chromatin pattern, vacuolated cytoplasm, and their tendency to appear in clumps or clusters, although some of these characteristics are shared by megakaryoblasts and monoblasts. Tumour cells are often found at the edge of the blood smear due to their large size, so this area should be examined thoroughly if carcinocythemia is suspected.

Cytochemical staining and immunohistochemistry techniques can help determine the lineage of the cells. When immunophenotyped by flow cytometry, the cells are generally CD45 negative and may express CD56, a profile that is non-specific but unusual for hematologic malignancies. In some cases, flow cytometry and FISH results may be misleading, as circulating tumour cells can exhibit cell markers and chromosomal abnormalities associated with hematologic diseases.

Bone marrow examination is indicated in carcinocythemia to better characterize the tumour cells.

=== Differential diagnosis ===
Carcinocythemia must be distinguished from the following conditions:

- Acute leukemia
- Circulating immature cells secondary to chemotherapy
- Circulating endothelial cells, megakaryocytes or osteoclasts
- Leukemoid reaction
- Lymphoma

== History ==
The presence of tumour cells in the peripheral blood of a cancer patient was first described in an 1869 case report in the Medical Journal of Australia. The term carcinocythemia was first used in 1976 by Robert Carey. In 1984, a review of 10 cases was published, noting the condition's poor prognosis.

== Other animals ==
As of 2018, there were two documented cases of carcinocythemia in dogs and one case in a cat.
