= Toxic vacuolation =

Inflammatory change in neutrophils

- Other names: Toxic vacuolization
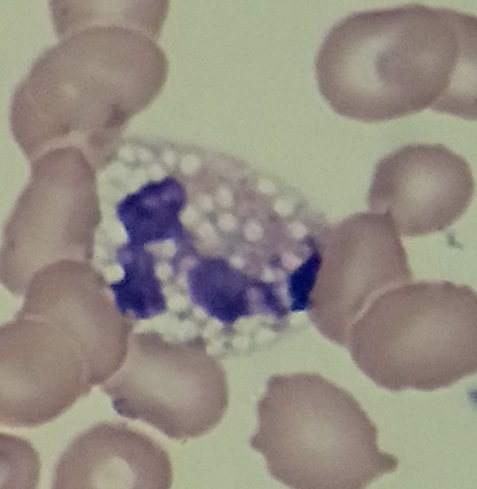
- A vacuolated neutrophil
- Specialty: Hematology
- Causes: Sepsis, bacterial infection, alcohol toxicity, liver failure, G-CSF treatment

Toxic vacuolation, also known as toxic vacuolization, is the formation of vacuoles in the cytoplasm of neutrophils in response to severe infections or inflammatory conditions.

== Clinical significance ==
Toxic vacuolation is associated with sepsis, particularly when accompanied by toxic granulation. The finding is also associated with bacterial infection, alcohol toxicity, liver failure, and treatment with granulocyte colony-stimulating factor, a cytokine drug used to increase the absolute neutrophil count in patients with neutropenia.

The formation of toxic vacuoles represents increased phagocytic activity, which is stimulated by the release of cytokines in response to inflammation or tissue injury. Toxic vacuolation frequently occurs in conjunction with toxic granulation and Döhle bodies in inflammatory states, and these findings are collectively referred to as toxic changes. Neutrophilia and left shift (the presence of immature neutrophil precursors such as band neutrophils and metamyelocytes in the peripheral blood) often accompany toxic changes, as these phenomena also occur in response to inflammation.

It has been suggested that neutrophil vacuoles not be labelled "toxic vacuoles" unless they are accompanied by other toxic changes, as vacuolation can occur in other conditions.

== Similar conditions ==
Vacuoles may form in neutrophils if a blood sample is left standing for several hours prior to blood smear preparation, but this is an artifactual change with no clinical significance. Artifactual vacuoles are small and of uniform size and distribution, in contrast to toxic vacuoles whose size and placement are variable. Individuals with neutral lipid storage disease may exhibit persistent lipid-filled vacuoles in neutrophils and other granulocytes, which is a distinct phenomenon termed Jordans' anomaly.

== See also ==
- Leukemoid reaction
- Acute phase reaction
