= Leukocytosis =

- Specialty: Infectious disease, pathology

Leukocytosis is a condition in which the white cell (leukocyte) count is above the normal range in the blood. It is frequently a sign of an inflammatory response, most commonly the result of infection, but may also occur following certain parasitic infections or bone tumors as well as leukemia. It may also occur after strenuous exercise, convulsions such as in epilepsy, emotional stress, pregnancy and labor, anesthesia, as a side effect of medication (e.g., lithium), and epinephrine administration. There are five principal types of leukocytosis: neutrophilia (the most common form), lymphocytosis, monocytosis, eosinophilia, and basophilia.

This increase in leukocyte (primarily neutrophils) is usually accompanied by a "left upper shift" in the ratio of immature to mature neutrophils and macrophages. The proportion of immature leukocytes increases due to proliferation and inhibition of granulocyte and monocyte precursors in the bone marrow which is stimulated by several products of inflammation including C3a and G-CSF. Although it may indicate illness, leukocytosis is considered a laboratory finding instead of a separate disease. This classification is similar to that of fever, which is also a test result instead of a disease. "Right shift" in the ratio of immature to mature neutrophils is considered with reduced count or lack of "young neutrophils" (metamyelocytes, and band neutrophils) in blood smear, associated with the presence of "giant neutrophils". This fact shows suppression of bone marrow activity, as a hematological sign specific for pernicious anemia and radiation sickness.

A leukocyte count above 50×10^{9}/L is termed a leukemoid reaction, which is the reaction of a healthy bone marrow to extreme stress, trauma, or infection. It is different from leukemia and from leukoerythroblastosis, in which either immature white blood cells (acute leukemia) or mature, yet non-functional, white blood cells (chronic leukemia) are present in peripheral blood.

== Classification ==
Leukocytosis can be subcategorized by the type of white blood cell that is increased in number. Leukocytosis in which neutrophils are elevated is neutrophilia; leukocytosis in which lymphocyte count is elevated is lymphocytosis; leukocytosis in which monocyte count is elevated is monocytosis; and leukocytosis in which eosinophil count is elevated is eosinophilia.

An extreme form of leukocytosis, in which the WBC count exceeds 100000/μL, is leukostasis. In this form there are so many WBCs that clumps of them block blood flow. This leads to ischemic problems including transient ischemic attack and stroke.

== Causes ==
Causes of leukocytosis
| Neutrophilic leukocytosis (neutrophilia) | Acute bacterial infections, especially pyogenic infections; Sterile inflammation; Tissue necrosis; Myocardial infarction; Burns |
| Eosinophilic leukocytosis (eosinophilia) | Allergic disorders; Asthma; Hay fever; Drug allergies; Allergic skin diseases; Pemphigus; Dermatitis herpetiformis; Parasitic infections; Some forms of malignancy; Hodgkin's lymphoma; Some forms of non-Hodgkin lymphoma; Systemic autoimmune diseases (e.g. SLE); Some forms of vasculitis; Cholesterol embolism (transiently) |
| Basophilic leukocytosis (basophilia) | (rare): Myeloproliferative disease, e.g. chronic myelogenous leukemia |
| Monocytosis | Chronic infections; Tuberculosis; Bacterial endocarditis; Rickettsiosis; Malaria; Systemic autoimmune diseases (e.g. SLE); Inflammatory bowel diseases (e.g. ulcerative colitis); some forms of malignancy (e.g. chronic myelomonocytic leukemia) |
| Lymphocytosis | Chronic infections; Tuberculosis; Brucellosis; Viral infections; Hepatitis; Cytomegalovirus infection; Infectious mononucleosis; Pertussis; Some forms of malignancy (e.g. lymphocytic leukemias) |

Leukocytosis is very common in acutely ill patients. It occurs in response to a wide variety of conditions, including viral, bacterial, fungal, or parasitic infection, cancer, hemorrhage, and exposure to certain medications or chemicals including steroids. For lung diseases such as pneumonia and tuberculosis, WBC count is very important for the diagnosis of the disease, as leukocytosis is usually present.

The mechanism that causes leukocytosis can be of several forms: an increased release of leukocytes from bone marrow storage pools, decreased margination of leukocytes onto vessel walls, decreased extravasation of leukocytes from the vessels into tissues, or an increase in number of precursor cells in the marrow.

Certain medications, including corticosteroids, lithium and beta agonists, may cause leukocytosis.

Leukocytosis is an expected finding in healthy women during the post-partum period and is not a cause for alarm unless accompanied by clinical manifestations of infection.

== Diagnosis ==
=== Leukocyte counts ===
Below are blood reference ranges for various types of leukocytes and WBCs. The 97.5 percentile (right limits in intervals in image, showing 95% prediction intervals) is a common limit for defining leukocytosis.

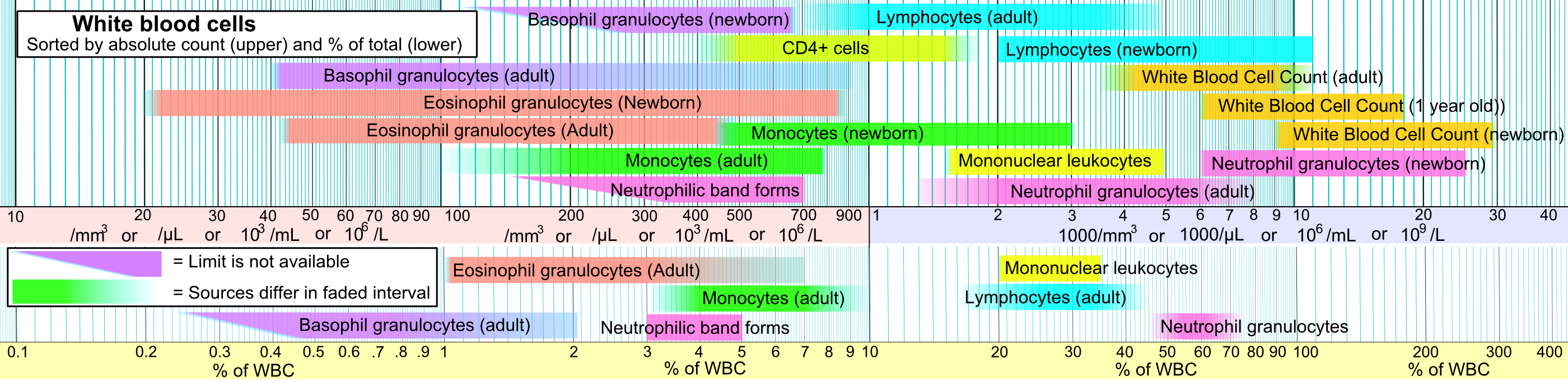

== Treatment ==
While treatment is usually not necessary in the majority of cases, hyperleukocytosis (WBC count greater than about 100×10^{9}/L), which can be seen in some leukemic patients, is treated to prevent leukostasis.

== See also ==
- Bacterial infection
- Complete blood count
- Leukocytosis in head trauma
- White blood cell
