= Alder–Reilly anomaly =

White blood cell abnormality

Alder–Reilly anomaly, or Alder anomaly, is an inherited abnormality of white blood cells associated with mucopolysaccharidosis. When blood smears and bone marrow preparations from patients with Alder–Reilly anomaly are stained and examined microscopically, large, coarse granules may be seen in their neutrophils, monocytes, and lymphocytes. The condition may be mistaken for toxic granulation, a type of abnormal granulation in neutrophils that occurs transiently in inflammatory conditions.

In addition to mucopolysaccharidosis, Alder–Reilly anomaly may occur in lipofuscinosis and Tay–Sachs disease. While the anomaly is generally considered to exhibit autosomal recessive inheritance, it may also occur in carriers who are heterozygous for the Tay–Sachs mutation, although the inclusions are much less frequent than in homozygotes. Alder–Reilly anomaly is not diagnostic of any disorder and does not correlate with disease severity. Affected white blood cells function normally.

Alder–Reilly inclusions stain appear violet when treated with Wright–Giemsa stain and, in mucopolysaccharidosis, stain metachromatically with toluidine blue. Metachromatic staining is not seen in Tay–Sachs disease. The granules tend to be round or comma-shaped and may be surrounded by a clearing in the cytoplasm.
