= DIFF =

DIFF or diff may refer to:

- diff, a file comparison tool
- Data comparison, methods and implementations to compare texts or files
- Dubai International Film Festival
- Dublin International Film Festival
- Dharamshala International Film Festival
- a motor vehicle's differential (mechanical device)
- White blood cell differential, a medical test enumerating each type of white blood cell

== See also ==
- Help:Diff, for information on diffs of pages in Wikipedia
