= Autodiff =

Autodiff may refer to:

- Automatic differentiation, a set of techniques to numerically evaluate the derivative of a function specified by a computer program.
- White blood cell differential
