= Arnold Ludwig Gotthilf Heller =

German anatomist and pathologist

Arnold Ludwig Gotthilf Heller (1 May 1840 – 1913) was a German anatomist and pathologist who was a native of Kleinheubach am Main, Bavaria.

He studied medicine at the Universities of Erlangen, Berlin and Leipzig, and as a student had as instructors Friedrich Albert von Zenker (1825-1898), Carl Ludwig (1816-1895) and Rudolf Virchow (1821-1902). In 1866 he received his medical doctorate, and in 1869 was habilitated at Erlangen. In 1872 he became professor of general pathology and pathological anatomy at the University of Kiel.

In 1899 Heller proved that syphilis was a cause of aortic aneurysm, and with his assistant Karl Gottfried Paul Döhle (1855-1928), he described syphilitic aortitis, a condition sometimes referred to as "Döhle-Heller syndrome".

In 1869 he demonstrated how lymph propulsion takes place in the lymph vessels.

== Associated eponym ==
- Heller's plexus: Plexus of small arteries in the intestinal wall.

== Selected writings ==
- Über selbständige rhytmische Contractionen der Lymphgefässe. Centralblatt für die medicinischen Wissenschaften, Berlin, 1869.
- Strictur der Pulmonalarterie. Virchow's Archiv für pathologische Anatomie und Physiologie und für klinische Medizin, Berlin. 1870.
- Ueber die syphilitische Aortitis und ihre Bedeutung für die Entstehung von Aneurysmen. Verhandlungen der deutschen pathologischen Gesellschaft, Stuttgart, 1900, page 346.
