= Karl Gottfried Paul Döhle =

German pathologist

Karl Gottfried Paul Döhle (6 June 1855 – 7 December 1928) was a German pathologist who was a native of Mühlhausen.

He was a student at Tübingen, Leipzig, Strassburg and Kiel, where he received his doctorate in 1882. Afterwards he was an assistant at the pathological institute in Kiel, where in 1908 he was appointed head of the pathological institute. In 1921 he attained the title of professor ordinarius (full professor) at the University of Kiel, retiring a few years later in 1924.

Döhle is remembered for his work in the field of histopathology, particularly in his research of syphilitic inflammation of the aorta. He is credited with providing a clear anatomical understanding of syphilitic aortitis. A sometimes-used synonym of syphilitic aortitis is "Döhle-Heller aortitis", named after Döhle and Arnold Ludwig Gotthilf Heller (1840-1913), Döhle's mentor in Kiel.

He is also known for the discovery of small (1-3 μm in diameter) light blue-gray basophilic leukocyte inclusions in the periphery of neutrophils, structures that are known today as "Döhle bodies".

== Selected writings ==
- Ein Fall von eigentümlicher Aortenerkrankung bei einem Syphilitischen. (Treatise on syphilitic aortitis), Kiel, 1885.
- Vorläufige Mittheilung über Blutbefunde bei Masern, Zentralblatt für allgemeine Pathologie und pathologische Anatomie, Jena, 1892, 3: 150-152. - Preliminary communication on "blood findings" in measles.
- Leukocyteneinschlüsse bei Scharlach, Zentralblatt für Bakteriologie, Parasitenkunde, Infektionskrankheiten und Hygiene, 1912, 61: 63-68. - Leucocyte inclusions in scarlet fever.

== See also ==
- Pathology
- List of pathologists
