= Basophilia =

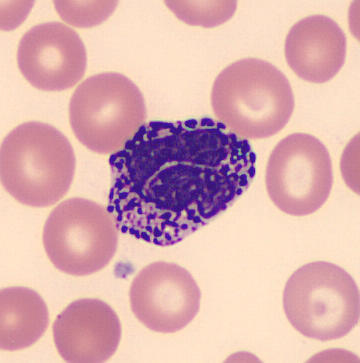
- Basophilic Granulocyte surrounded by Erythrocytes and a Thrombocyte.
- Pronunciation: bā-sə-ˈfi-lē-ə
- Specialty: Hematology
- Causes: Chronic myeloid leukemia, polycythemia vera, primary myelofibrosis, essential thrombocythemia, acute myeloid leukemia, allergic reactions or chronic inflammation related to infections, inflammatory bowel disease, and autoimmune disease.
- Diagnostic method: Complete blood count and blood smear.

Basophilia is the condition of having greater than 200 basophils/μL in the venous blood. Basophils are the least numerous of the myelogenous cells, and it is rare for their numbers to be abnormally high without changes to other blood components. Rather, basophilia is most often coupled with other white blood cell conditions such as eosinophilia, high levels of eosinophils in the blood. Basophils are easily identifiable by a blue coloration of the granules within each cell, marking them as granulocytes, in addition to segmented nuclei.

== Causes ==
Basophilia can be attributed to many causes and is typically not sufficient evidence alone to signify a specific condition when isolated as a finding under microscopic examination. Coupled with other findings, such as abnormal levels of neutrophils, it may suggest the need for additional workup. As an example, additional evidence of left-shifted neutrophilia alongside basophilia indicates a potential likelihood primarily of chronic myeloid leukemia (CML), or an alternate myeloproliferative neoplasm. Additionally, basophilia in the presence of numerous circulating blasts suggests the possibility of acute myeloid leukemia. Elevation of basophils may also be representative of multiple other underlying neoplasms such as polycythemia vera (PV), myelofibrosis, thrombocythemia, or, in rare cases, solid tumors. Alternative root causes other than these neoplasmic complications are most commonly allergic reactions or chronic inflammation related to infections such as tuberculosis, influenza, inflammatory bowel disorder, or an inflammatory autoimmune disease. Moreover, basophilia can be a symptom of mast cell activation syndrome (MCAS). Chronic hemolytic anemia and infectious diseases such as smallpox also demonstrate elevated basophil levels. Certain drug usage and food ingestion can also correlate with symptoms of basophilia.

== Diagnosis ==
Basophilia can be detected through a complete blood count (CBC). The root cause of basophilia can be determined through a bone marrow biopsy, genetic testing to look for genetic mutations, or ultrasound to determine enlargement of the spleen. A bone marrow aspirate may be used to confirm an increase in basophils or significantly high numbers of precursors to the granulocytes. Since basophilia is present in a vast range of clinical conditions, depending on a variety of underlying causes, supplemental signs and symptoms must be investigated for a diagnosis. If splenomegaly is detected, a myeloproliferative syndrome may be suspected. Intrinsically related symptoms such as fever, malaise, pruritus (itching) due to the release of histamine, fatigue, and right upper quadrant pain may be present in the afflicted patient. With some conditions, such as polycythemia vera, erythromelalgia, or burning of the palms and soles, coupled with thrombocytosis is common. This severe symptomatology may require urgent attention. If basophilia and the aforementioned symptoms are present with concurrent eosinophilia greater than 1500 cells/μL, hypereosinophilic syndrome may be considered. In cases of underlying allergic reactions or adverse sensitivity, skin rashes may be present.

After symptomatic evaluation, a peripheral blood smear is examined to determine cell counts.In cases of a supposed myeloid neoplasm, a bone marrow biopsy will be performed using cytogenetic analysis. This type of testing uses the karyotypes of chromosomes for each type of leukocyte and looks for a significant abnormality in any of the conventional karyotypes which could support the diagnosis of a neoplastic process. Basophilia on its own does not cause much complication other than those related to the primary causative condition. However, basophils can degranulate causing tissue damage, but this can be avoided with early detection and intervention.

== Treatment ==
Basophilia, as it is primarily a secondary condition, is treated by addressing the causative disease or disorder. The underlying condition will determine what treatment is appropriate. Specifically in cases of allergic reactions or associated with chronic inflammation, treating the underlying cause is critical to avoid further, potentially irreparable damage to the body's organ systems. Common treatments to allergic reactions include cessation of use of the offending agent, and the administration of antihistamines. Infection-related basophilia can be remedied by using antibiotics to treat the underlying causative infection, whereas neoplasm related basophilia may have a more complicated clinical course including chemotherapy and periodic phlebotomy.
