= Aortitis =

- Specialty: Cardiology
- Diagnostic method: ANA, ANCA

Aortitis is the inflammation of the aortic wall. The disorder is potentially life-threatening and rare. It is reported that there are only 1–3 new cases of aortitis per year per million people in the United States and Europe. Aortitis is most common in people 10 to 40 years of age.

== Causes ==
This inflammation has a number of possible causes, including trauma, viral or bacterial infections (notably, syphilis), and certain immune disorders and connective tissue diseases.

Aortitis is most commonly seen in patients with syphilis, autoimmune vasculitis (giant cell arteritis, Takayasu's arteritis), polymyalgia rheumatica, and rheumatoid arthritis. IgG4-related disease has more recently been identified as a cause of aortitis, and also as a cause of periaortitis (inflammation surrounding the aorta).

There is a wide range of symptoms that are dependent on the location of the aortic inflammation or associated disorder. A few symptoms recognized in patients are fever, chills, muscle pains, and malaise (general discomfort). In addition, hypertension (high blood pressure) may occur. Hypertension happens when the renal artery narrows and elasticity of the aorta and branches decrease. Aortitis can also be caused by Salmonella infection.

== Diagnosis ==
Diagnosis of aortitis starts with physical examination and recording patient's medical history. Imaging tests such as magnetic resonance angiography, doppler ultrasonography, and positron emission tomography(PET) can be used to look at the blood vessels and blood flow, and highlight areas of inflammation. Condition is generally diagnosed based on the symptoms the patient is experiencing and the aortic images.

== Treatment ==
Treatment of aortitis depends on the underlying cause. The initial treatment of suspected infectious aortitis is intravenous antibiotics with broad antimicrobial coverage of the most likely pathologic organisms, In contrast, immunosuppressive therapy is the primary treatment of non-infectious aortitis due to large-vessel vasculitis, and patients are ideally managed by a multi-disciplinary team that includes a rheumatologist and medical and surgical cardiovascular specialists. Once the diagnosis of non-infectious aortitis due to GCA or Takayasu arteritis has been established, oral glucocorticoid therapy should be initiated. Frequently, adjunctive immunosuppressants, including methotrexate and azathioprine, are paired with steroids to treat refractory disease or to minimize steroid-induced adverse effects.

Management includes the following treatment priorities: stop the inflammation, treat complications, prevent and monitor for re-occurrence.

== Prognosis ==
If untreated, has three distinct phases. The first is a prepulseless inflammatory stage with nonspecific symptoms such as fatigue, arthralgias, and low-grade fevers. Phase two includes vascular inflammation with pain secondary to the condition, along with tenderness to palpation over the site. The last phase includes symptoms of ischemia and pain associated with the use of limbs. Limbs are also cool and clammy in this stage.
