= Toxic granulation =

Type of granules

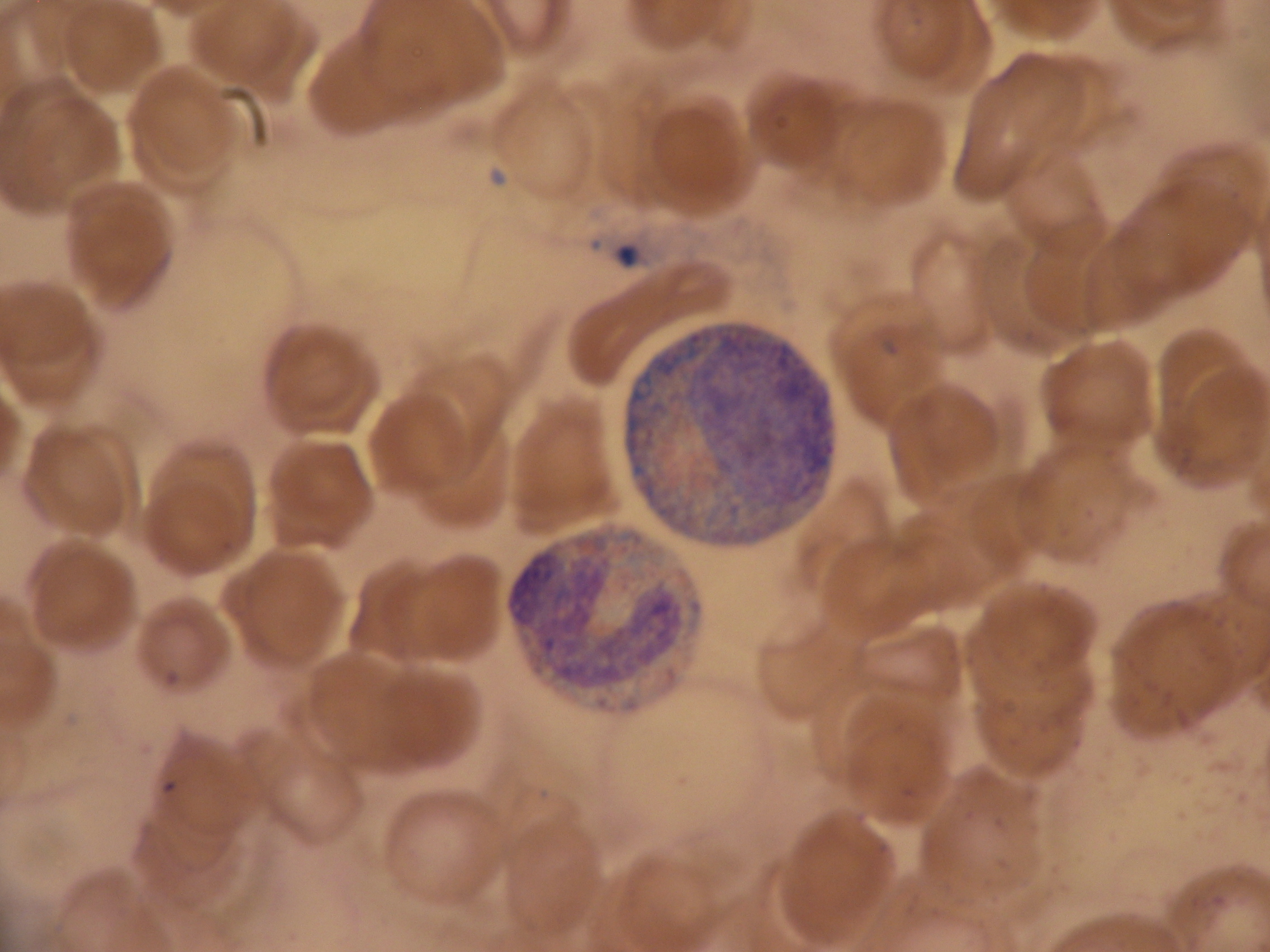
Toxic granulation in two white blood cells, bone marrow aspiration.

Toxic granulation refers to dark coarse granules found in granulocytes, particularly neutrophils, in patients with inflammatory conditions.

== Clinical significance ==
Along with Döhle bodies and toxic vacuolation, which are two other findings in the cytoplasm of granulocytes, toxic granulation is a peripheral blood film finding suggestive of an inflammatory process. Toxic granulation is often found in patients with bacterial infection and sepsis, although the finding is nonspecific. Patients being treated with chemotherapy or granulocyte colony stimulating factor, a cytokine drug, may also exhibit toxic granulation.

== Composition ==
Toxic granules are mainly composed of peroxidase and acid hydrolase enzymes, and are similar in composition to the primary granules found in immature granulocytic cells like promyelocytes. Although normal, mature neutrophils do contain some primary granules, the granules are difficult to identify by light microscopy because they lose their dark blue colour as the cells mature. Toxic granulation thus represents abnormal maturation of neutrophils.

== Similar conditions ==
Patients with the inherited condition Alder-Reilly anomaly exhibit very large, darkly staining granules in their neutrophils, which can be confused with toxic granulation.

== See also ==
- Inflammation
- Neutrophilia
