= Leukemoid reaction =

- Specialty: Hematology

The term leukemoid reaction describes an increased white blood cell count (> 50,000 cells/μL), which is a physiological response to stress or infection (as opposed to a primary blood malignancy, such as leukemia). It often describes the presence of immature cells such as myeloblasts or red blood cells with nuclei in the peripheral blood.

It may be lymphoid or myeloid.

== Causes ==
As noted above, a leukemoid reaction is typically a response to an underlying medical issue. Causes of leukemoid reactions include:

- Severe hemorrhage (retroperitoneal hemorrhage)
- Drugs
  - Use of sulfa drugs
  - Use of dapsone
  - Use of glucocorticoids
  - Use of G-CSF or related growth factors
  - All-trans retinoic acid (ATRA)
- Ethylene glycol intoxication
- Infections
  - Clostridioides difficile
  - Tuberculosis
  - Pertussis
  - Infectious mononucleosis (lymphocyte predominant)
  - Visceral larva migrans (eosinophil predominant)
- Asplenia
- Diabetic ketoacidosis
- Organ necrosis
  - Hepatic necrosis
  - Ischemic colitis
- As a feature of trisomy 21 in infancy (incidence of ~10%)
- As a paraneoplastic phenomenon (rare)

== Diagnosis ==
Conventionally, a leukocytosis exceeding 50,000 WBC/mm^{3} with a significant increase in early neutrophil precursors is referred to as a leukemoid reaction. The peripheral blood smear may show myelocytes, metamyelocytes, promyelocytes, and rarely myeloblasts; however, there is a mixture of early mature neutrophil precursors, in contrast to the immature forms typically seen in acute leukemia. Serum leukocyte alkaline phosphatase is normal or elevated in leukemoid reaction, but is depressed in chronic myelogenous leukemia. The bone marrow in a leukemoid reaction, if examined, may be hypercellular but is otherwise typically unremarkable.

Leukemoid reactions are generally benign and are not dangerous in and of themselves, although they are often a response to a significant disease state (see Causes above). However, leukemoid reactions can resemble more serious conditions such as chronic myelogenous leukemia (CML), which can present with identical findings on the peripheral blood smear. Historically, various clues including the leukocyte alkaline phosphatase score and the presence of basophilia were used to distinguish CML from a leukemoid reaction. However, at present the test of choice in adults to distinguish CML is an assay for the presence of the Philadelphia chromosome, either via cytogenetics and FISH, or via PCR for the BCR/ABL fusion gene. The LAP (leukocyte alkaline phosphatase) score is high in reactive states but is low in CML. In cases where the diagnosis is uncertain, a qualified hematologist or oncologist should be consulted.

== Treatment ==
Treatment of underlying condition. If drug induced, discontinue drug. If the reaction is found to be from anything besides drug use, certain anti neoplastic drugs may be indicated.

== See also ==
- Leukemid
- Leukocytosis
- Neutrophilia
