= Döhle bodies =

Inclusions in the cytoplasm of neutrophils

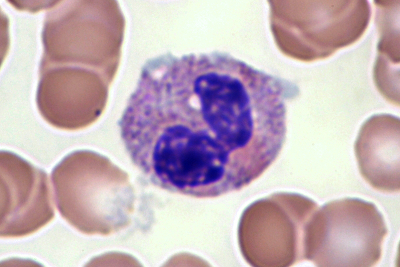
Döhle bodies seen in neutrophils of a peripheral smear

Döhle bodies are light blue-gray, oval, basophilic, leukocyte inclusions located in the peripheral cytoplasm of neutrophils. They measure 1–3 μm in diameter. Not much is known about their formation, but they are thought to be remnants of the rough endoplasmic reticulum.

They are named after German pathologist, Karl Gottfried Paul Döhle (1855–1928). They are often present in conjunction with toxic granulation. However, it has been found that certain healthy individuals may have persistent Döhle bodies found in neutrophils.

== Associated conditions ==
They are seen in:

- Burns
- Infection
- Physical trauma
- Neoplastic diseases
- Fanconi syndrome
- May–Hegglin anomaly
- Chédiak–Steinbrinck–Rayer-Buchanan-Higashi's syndrome
- Leukemoid reaction

== Pathophysiology ==
The presence of Döhle bodies in mature and immature neutrophils on a blood smear can be normal if they are present only in small numbers. They are also normally more abundant in cats and horses. Döhle bodies are intra-cytoplasmic structures thought to be composed of endoplasmic reticulum material; they will increase in number with inflammation and increased granulocytopoiesis. If there are many neutrophils in the bloodstream containing Döhle bodies, these can be referred to as toxic neutrophils. Toxic neutrophils can also correspond to neutrophils that possess a more basophilic cytoplasm, basophilic granulation (infrequently observed), or cytoplasmic vacuoles in addition to one of the preceding cytoplasmic changes. Döhle bodies, cytoplasmic basophilia and cytoplasmic granulation all reflect "defects" in cell production and maturation during active granulocytopoiesis. Just like a left shift, the presence of toxic neutrophils suggests increased granulocytopoiesis. However, in a freshly prepared blood smear, the presence of vacuolation in addition to toxic neutrophils reflects endotoxemia resulting in autolysis of neutrophils. This autodigestion is responsible for the cytoplasmic vacuolation. It is the single toxic change that does not result from the "manufacturing" process.
