= Syphilitic aortitis =

Inflammation of the aorta

- Other names: SA
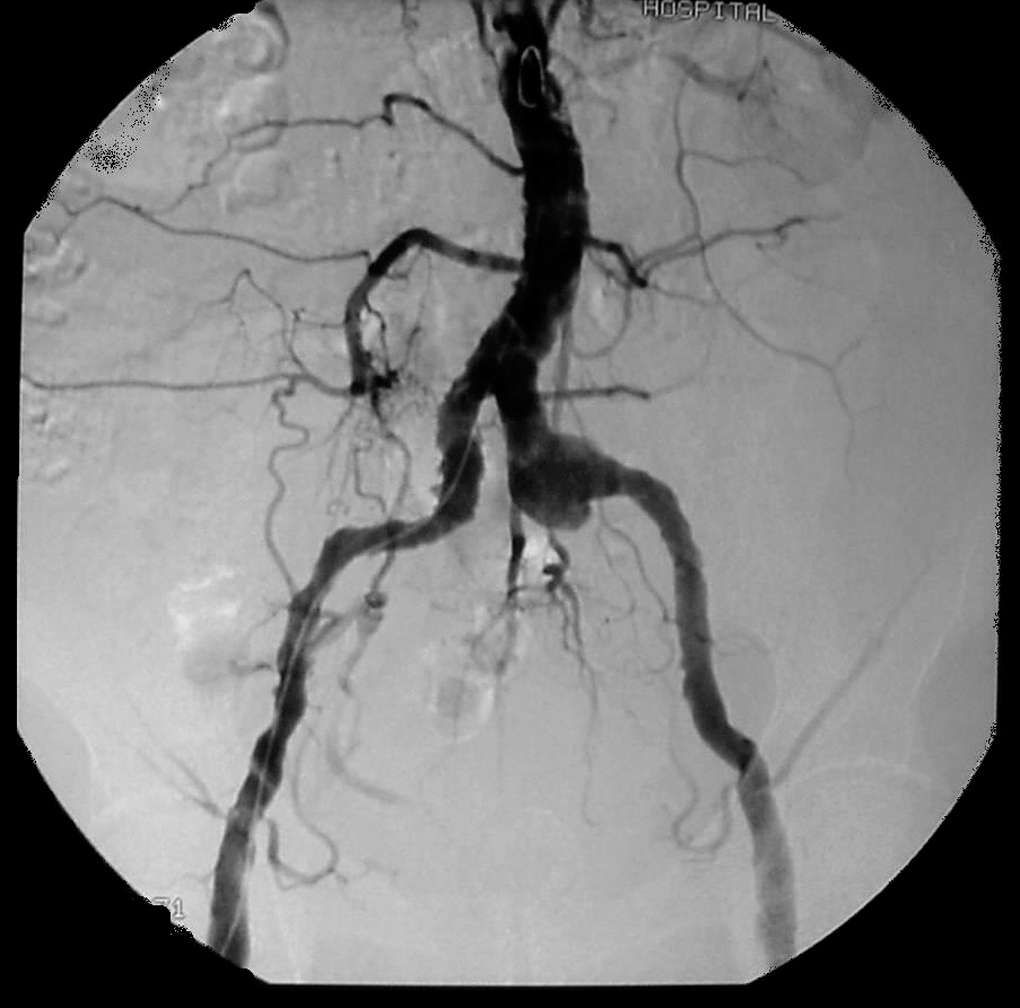
- Aneurysm, a commonly lethal complication of SA
- Specialty: Cardiology, Infectious disease
- Symptoms: Often none
- Complications: Aneurysm
- Usual onset: 40-55 years old, (initial infection is generally earlier in life)
- Causes: Treponema pallidum
- Risk factors: Unprotected sex, HIV, Drug use
- Prevention: Condoms, abstinence of sexual intercourse and drug use

Syphilitic aortitis is inflammation of the aorta associated with the tertiary stage of syphilis infection. SA begins as inflammation of the outermost layer of the blood vessel, including the blood vessels that supply the aorta itself with blood, the vasa vasorum. As SA worsens, the vasa vasorum undergo hyperplastic thickening of their walls thereby restricting blood flow and causing ischemia of the outer two-thirds of the aortic wall. Starved for oxygen and nutrients, elastic fibers become patchy and smooth muscle cells die. If the disease progresses, syphilitic aortitis leads to an aortic aneurysm. Overall, tertiary syphilis is a rare cause of aortic aneurysms. Syphilitic aortitis has become rare in the developed world with the advent of penicillin treatments after World War II.

== Signs and symptoms ==
The infection often has no symptoms until the patient develops an aneurysm because of the aortic dilatation. The disease is often discovered after a routine checkup of the heart and aorta. Although easily overlooked, other symptoms of tertiary syphilis might appear such as gummas and symptoms of neurosyphilis (headache, stiff neck, gait abnormality, dementia etc.). Additionally, in rare cases, chest pain and shortness of breath might appear as a result of the damage of the aorta and heart valve.

== Pathogenesis ==
Inflammatory involvement of tertiary syphilis begins at the adventitia of the aortic arch which progressively causes obliterative endarteritis of the vasa vasorum. This leads to narrowing of the lumen of the vasa vasorum, causing ischemic injury of the medial aortic arch and then finally loss of elastic support and dilation of the vessel. Dissection of the aortic arch is rare due to medial scarring. As a result of this advanced disease process, normal methods of angiography/angioplasty may be impossible for those with suspected coronary artery disease.

== Intravenous penicillin ==
Intravenous penicillin has been the primary treatment for syphilitic aortitis since the 1940s. The underlying bacterium of syphilis, T. pallidum, continues to be sensitive to penicillin as the lack of horizontal gene transfer mechanisms makes it difficult for the bacterium to mutate and resist treatment. In patients with aortic aneurysm, treatment would also involve surgical repair alongside intravenous penicillin, in order to reduce the likelihood of relapse.
