= Blood smear =

Method of blood examination

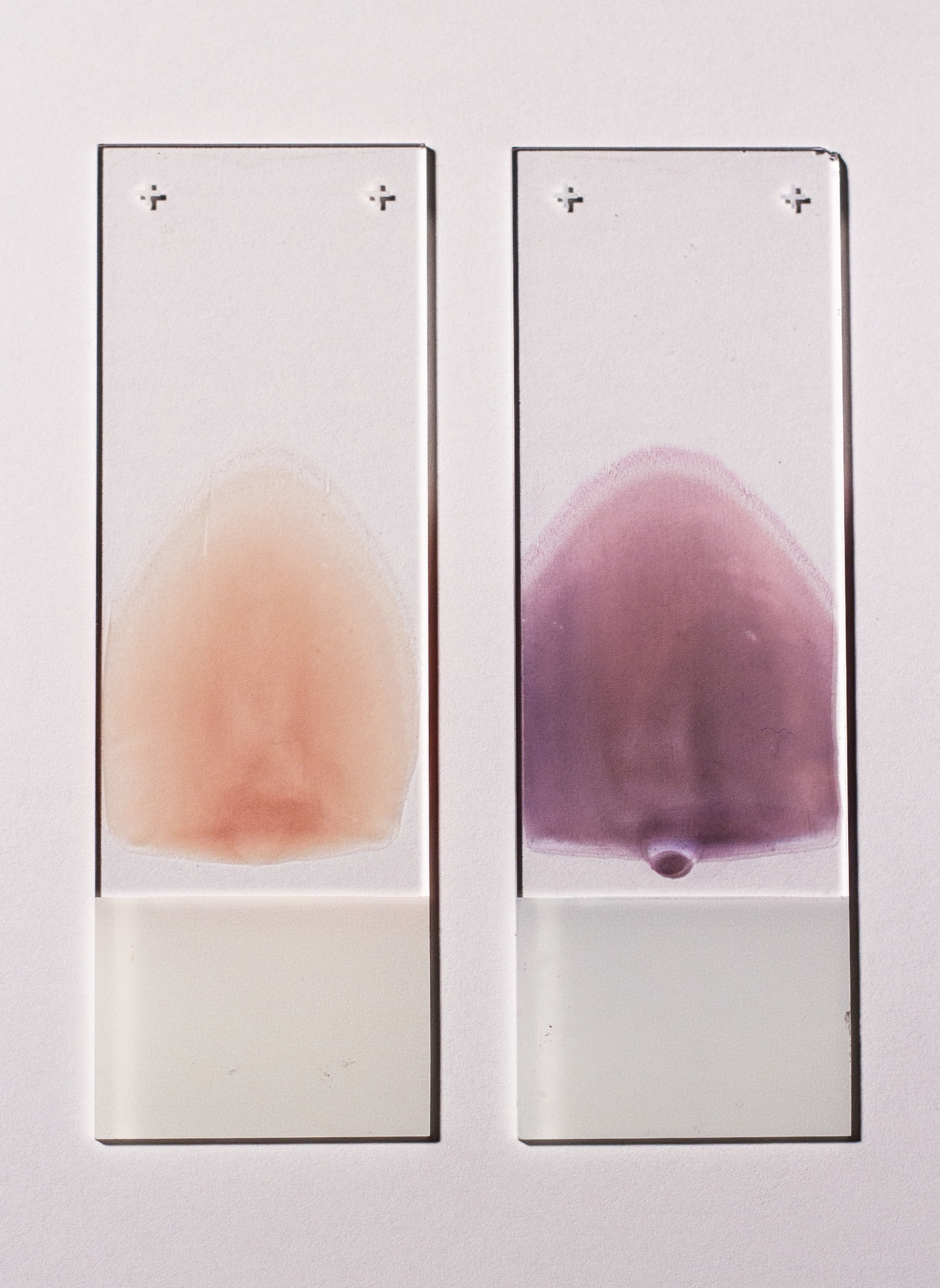
- Two push-type peripheral blood smears suitable for characterization of cellular blood elements. Left smear is unstained, right smear is stained with Wright-Giemsa stain.
- ICD-9-CM: 90.5
- MedlinePlus: 003665

A blood smear, peripheral blood smear or blood film is a thin layer of blood smeared on a glass microscope slide and then stained in such a way as to allow the various blood cells to be examined microscopically. Blood smears are examined in the investigation of hematological (blood) disorders and are routinely employed to look for blood parasites, such as those of malaria and filariasis.

== Preparation ==
A blood smear is made by placing a drop of blood on one end of a slide, and using a spreader slide to disperse the blood over the slide's length. The aim is to get a region, called a monolayer, where the cells are spaced far enough apart to be counted and differentiated. The monolayer is found in the "feathered edge" created by the spreader slide as it draws the blood forward.

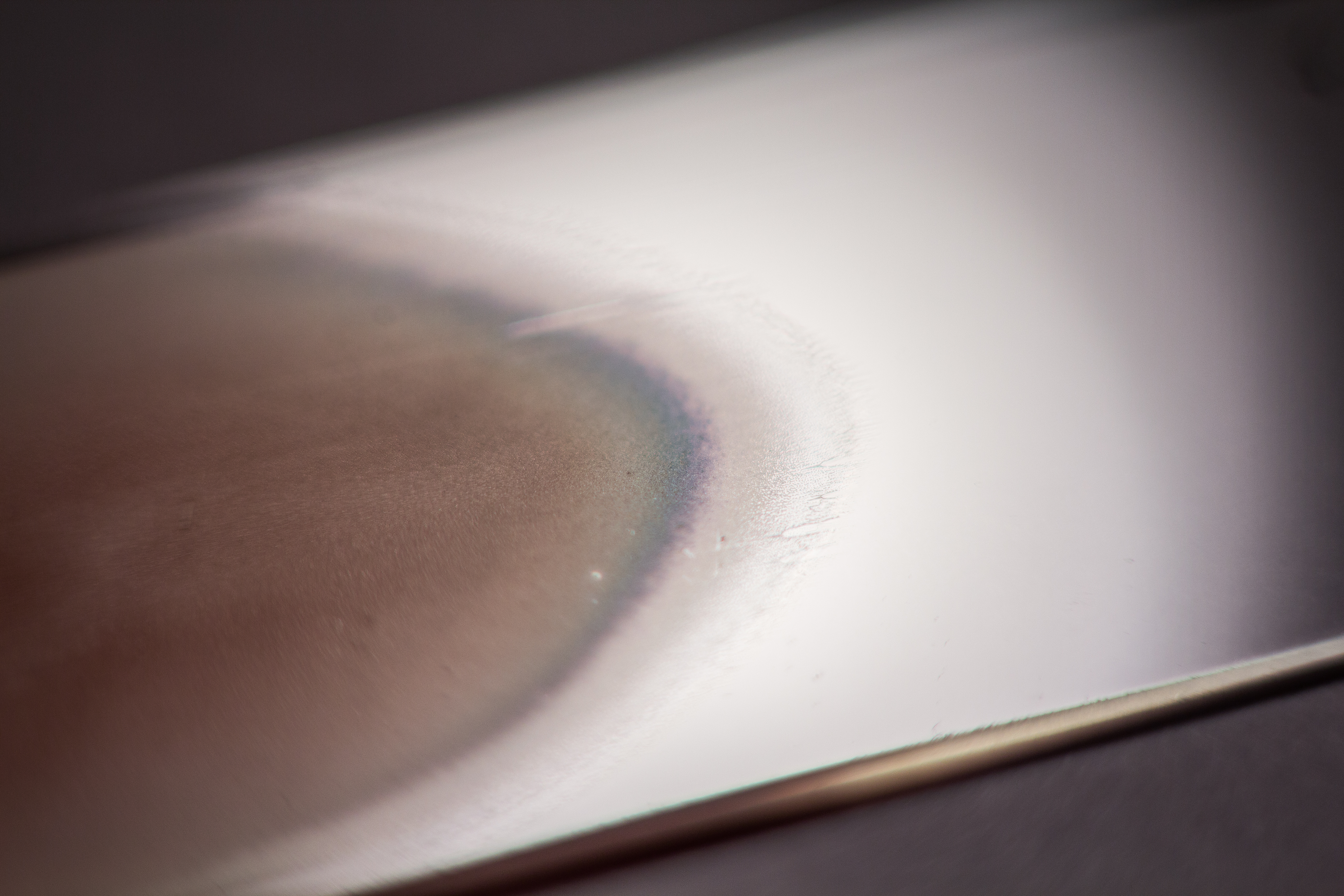
Unstained

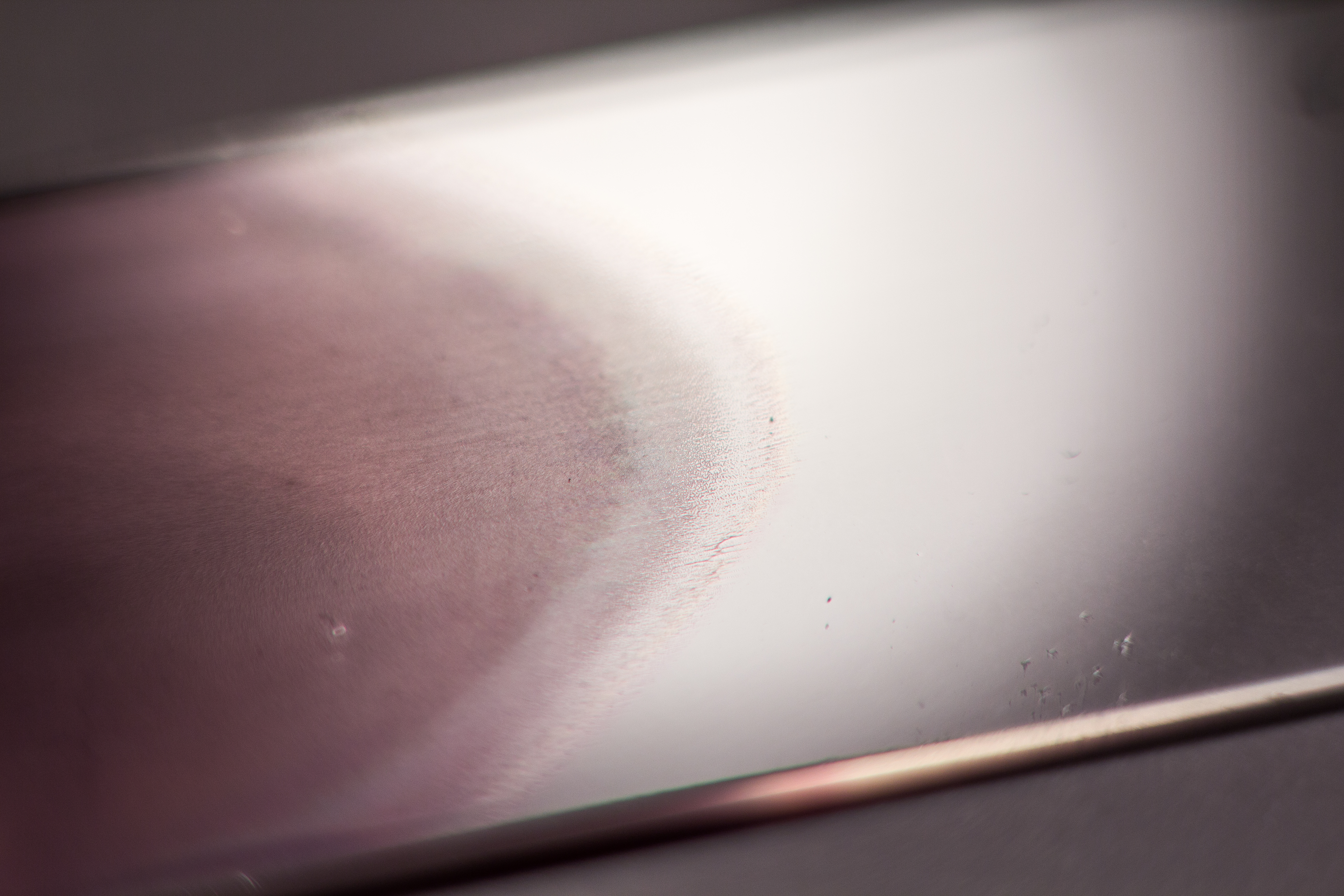
Wright-Giemsa stained

Closeups of the feathered edge of blood smears. The pale middle band of the gradient is the monolayer.

The slide is left to air dry, after which the blood is fixed to the slide by immersing it briefly in methanol. The fixative is essential for good staining and presentation of cellular detail. After fixation, the slide is stained to distinguish the cells from each other.

Routine analysis of blood in medical laboratories is usually performed on blood films stained with Romanowsky stains such as Wright's stain, Giemsa stain, or Diff-Quik. Wright-Giemsa combination stain is also a popular choice. These stains allow for the detection of white blood cell, red blood cell, and platelet abnormalities. Hematopathologists often use other specialized stains to aid in the differential diagnosis of blood disorders.

After staining, the monolayer is viewed under a microscope using magnification up to 1000 times. Individual cells are examined and their morphology is characterized and recorded.

== Clinical significance ==
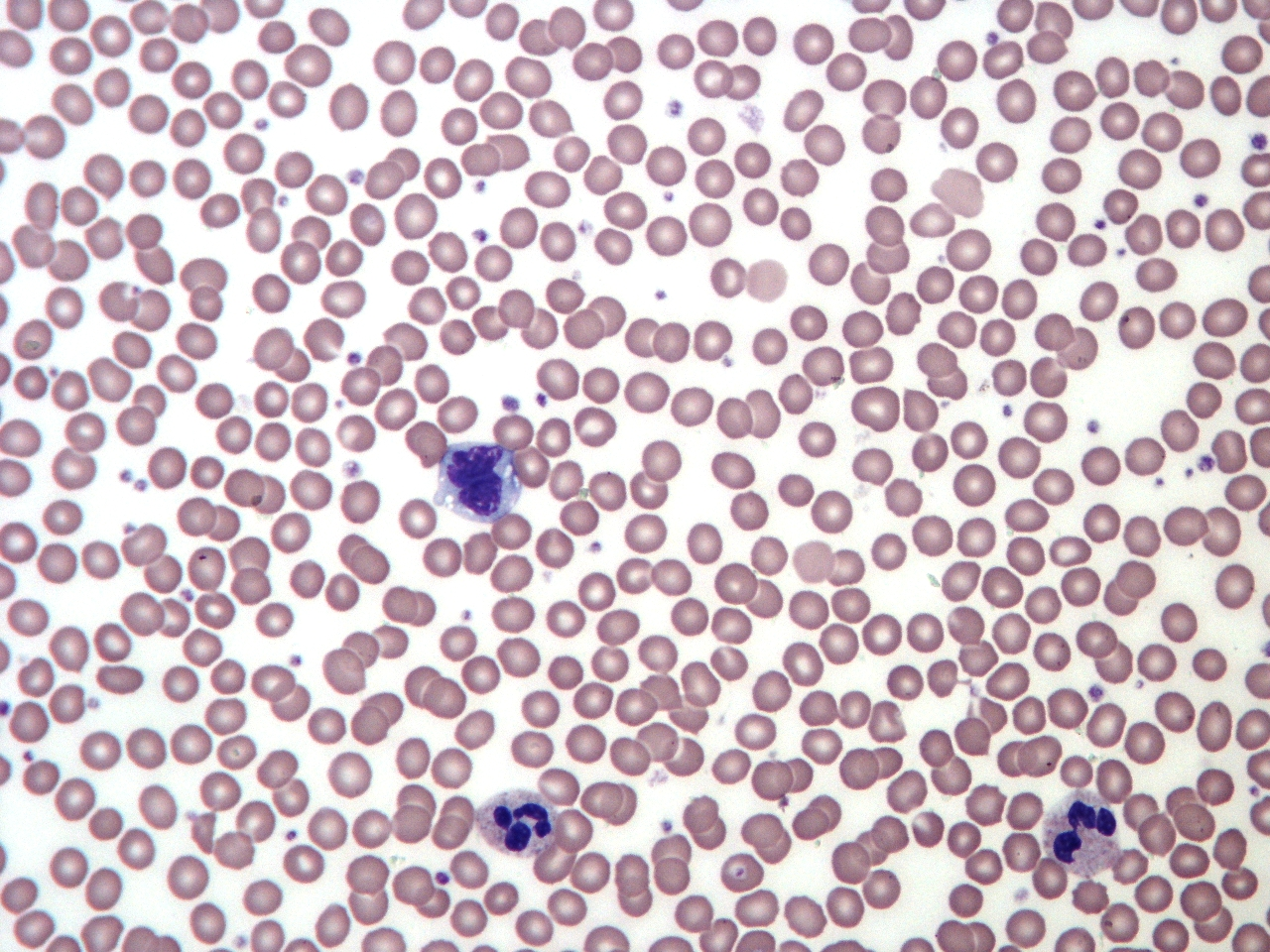
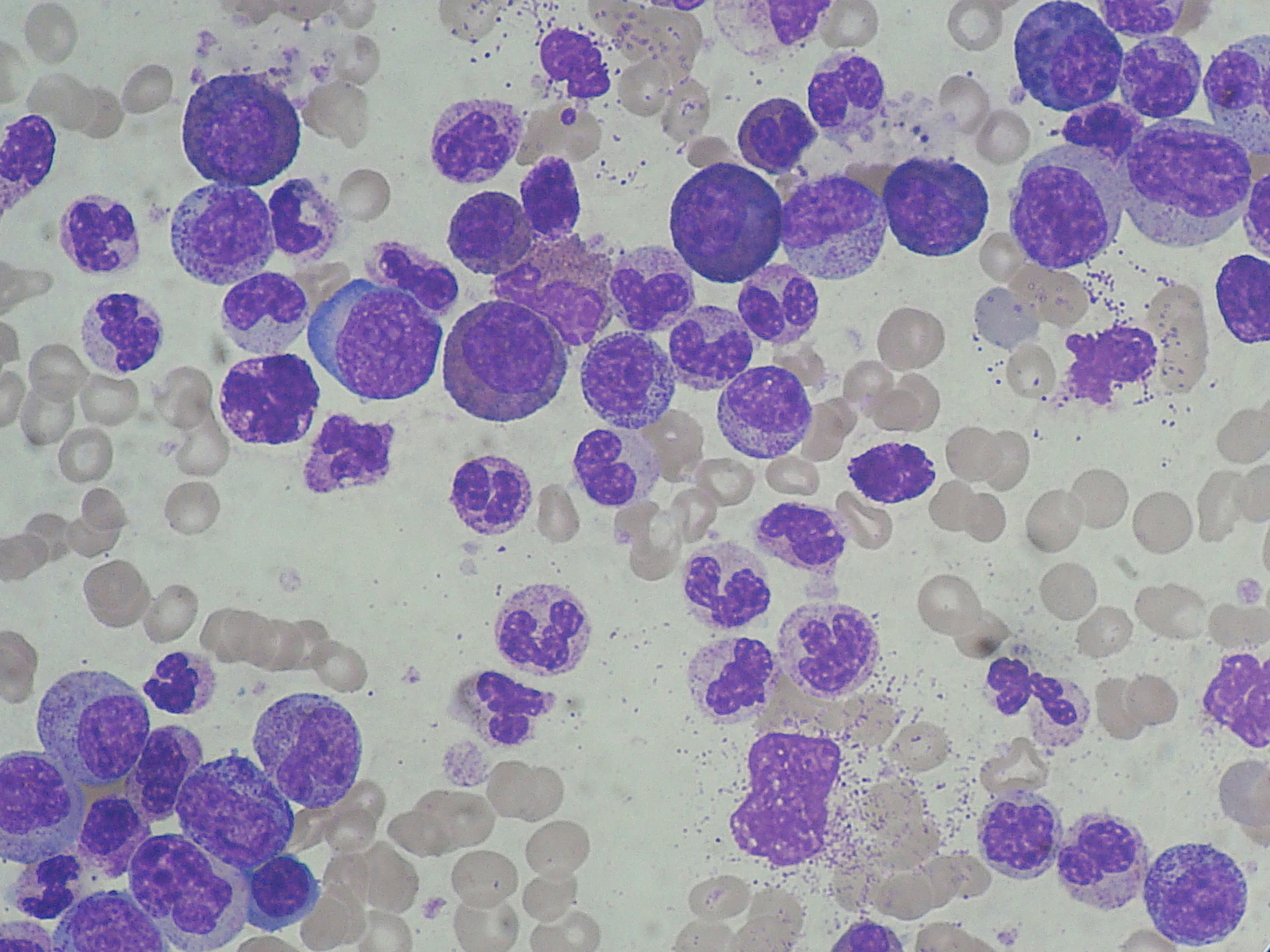
The left image shows a microscopic view of a normal adult blood film, while the right image shows a blood film from a patient with chronic myeloid leukemia.

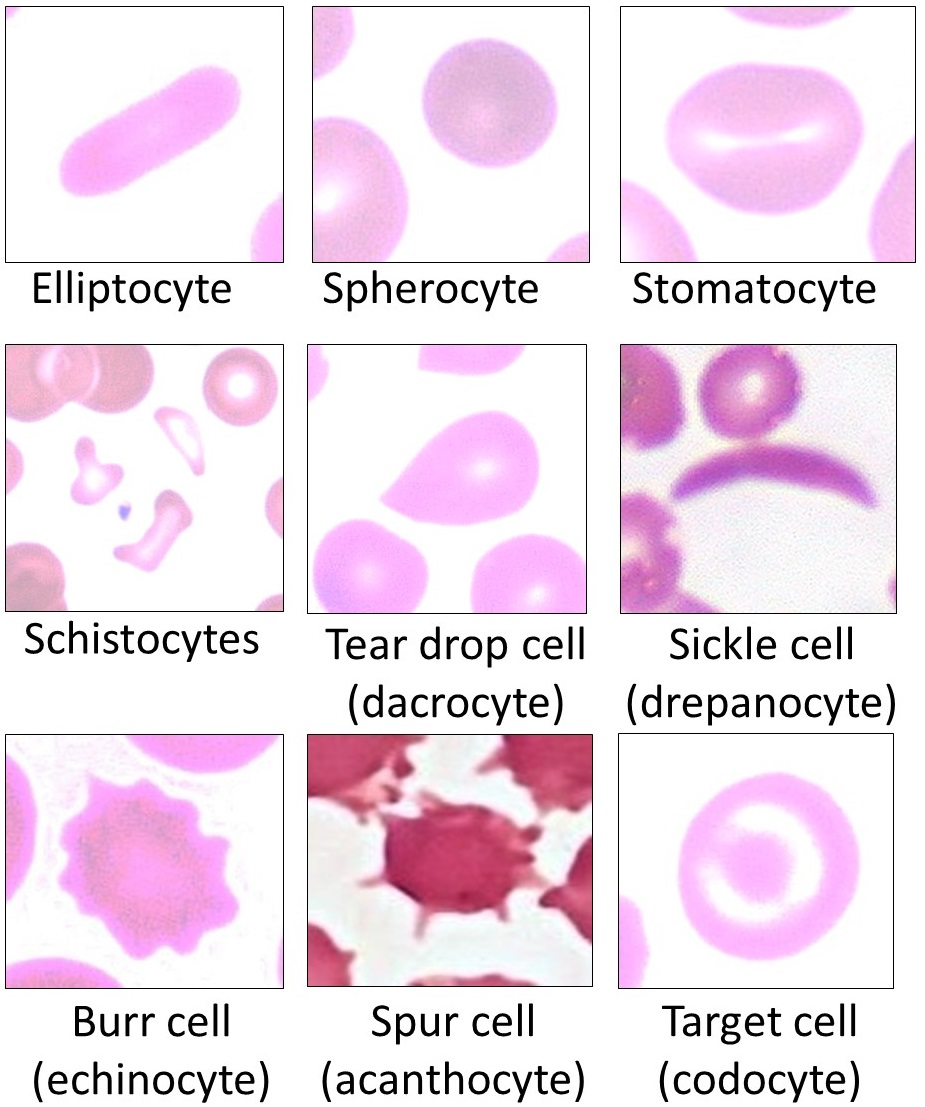
Variations of red blood cell shape on blood film, overall termed poikilocytosis

Blood smear examination is usually performed in conjunction with a complete blood count in order to investigate abnormal results or confirm results that the automated analyzer has flagged as unreliable.

Microscopic examination of the shape, size, and coloration of red blood cells is useful for determining the cause of anemia. Disorders such as iron deficiency anemia, sickle cell anemia, megaloblastic anemia and microangiopathic hemolytic anemia result in characteristic abnormalities on the blood film.

The proportions of different types of white blood cells can be determined from the blood smear. This is known as a manual white blood cell differential. The white blood cell differential can reveal abnormalities in the proportions of white blood cell types, such as neutrophilia and eosinophilia, as well as the presence of abnormal cells such as the circulating blast cells seen in acute leukemia. Qualitative abnormalities of white blood cells, like toxic granulation, are also visible on the blood smear. Modern complete blood count analyzers can provide an automated white blood cell differential, but they have a limited ability to differentiate immature and abnormal cells, so manual examination of the blood smear is frequently indicated.

Blood smear examination is the preferred diagnostic method for certain parasitic infections, such as malaria and babesiosis. Rarely, bacteria may be visible on the blood smear in patients with severe sepsis.

== Malaria ==
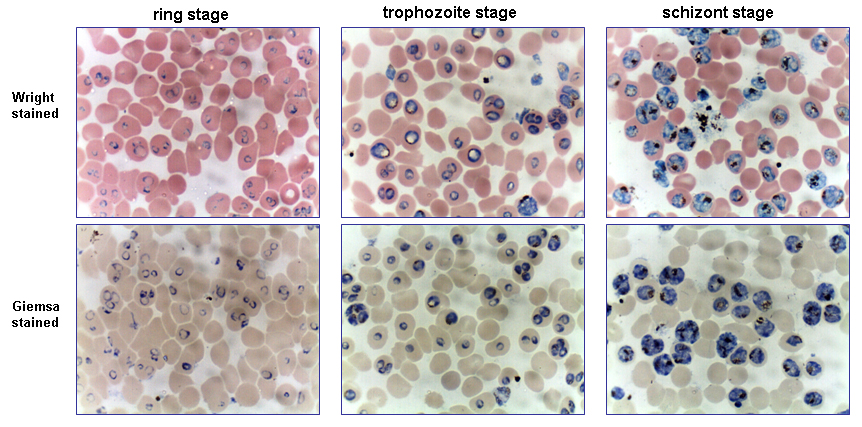
Blood smears showing various developmental stages of the malaria parasite Plasmodium falciparum, stained with Wright stain and Giemsa stain

The preferred and most reliable diagnosis of malaria is microscopic examination of blood smears, because each of the four major parasite species has distinguishing characteristics. Two sorts of blood smear are traditionally used.

- Thin smears are similar to usual blood films and allow species identification, because the parasite's appearance is best preserved in this preparation.
- Thick smears allow the microscopist to screen a larger volume of blood and are about eleven times more sensitive than the thin film, so picking up low levels of infection is easier on the thick film, but the appearance of the parasite is much more distorted and therefore distinguishing between the different species can be much more difficult.

From the thick smear, an experienced microscopist can detect all parasites they encounter. Microscopic diagnosis can be difficult because the early trophozoites ("ring form") of all four species look identical and it is never possible to diagnose species on the basis of a single ring form; species identification is always based on several trophozoites.

The biggest pitfall in most laboratories in developed countries is leaving too great a delay between taking the blood sample and making the blood smears. As blood cools to room temperature, male gametocytes will divide and release microgametes: these are long sinuous filamentous structures that can be mistaken for organisms such as Borrelia. If the blood is kept at warmer temperatures, schizonts will rupture and merozoites invading erythrocytes will mistakenly give the appearance of the accolé form of P. falciparum. If P. vivax or P. ovale is left for several hours in EDTA, the buildup of acid in the sample will cause the parasitised erythrocytes to shrink and the parasite will roll up, simulating the appearance of P. malariae. This problem is made worse if anticoagulants such as heparin or citrate are used. The anticoagulant that causes the least problems is EDTA. Romanowsky stain or a variant stain is usually used. Some laboratories mistakenly use the same staining pH as they do for routine haematology blood films (pH 6.8): malaria blood films must be stained at pH 7.2, or Schüffner's dots and James' dots will not be seen.

Immunochromatographic capture procedures (rapid diagnostic tests such as the malaria antigen detection tests) are nonmicroscopic diagnostic options for the laboratory that may not have appropriate microscopy expertise available.
