= Acute leukemia =

- Specialty: Oncology

Acute leukemia or acute leukaemia is a family of serious medical conditions relating to an original diagnosis of leukemia. In most cases, these can be classified according to the lineage, myeloid or lymphoid, of the malignant cells that grow uncontrolled, but some are mixed and for those such an assignment is not possible.

Forms of acute leukemia include:

- Acute myeloid leukemia (AML), a rare form of which is acute erythroid leukemia.
- Acute lymphoblastic leukemia (ALL) including T-cell acute lymphoblastic leukemia. Types of T-cell acute lymphoblastic leukemia include adult T-cell leukemia/lymphoma and (precursor) T-lymphoblastic leukemia/lymphoma.
- Blast crisis of chronic myelogenous leukemia.

== Medical statistics ==
Based on data from United States Cancer Statistics (USCS) Public Use Database for 2001–2017, the 2021 estimate for new cases of AML and ALL are following:

- Total estimated cases for AML: 20,240
- Total estimated cases for ALL: 5,690

Based on these estimates, AML is about 78% of the total cases.

== Images ==
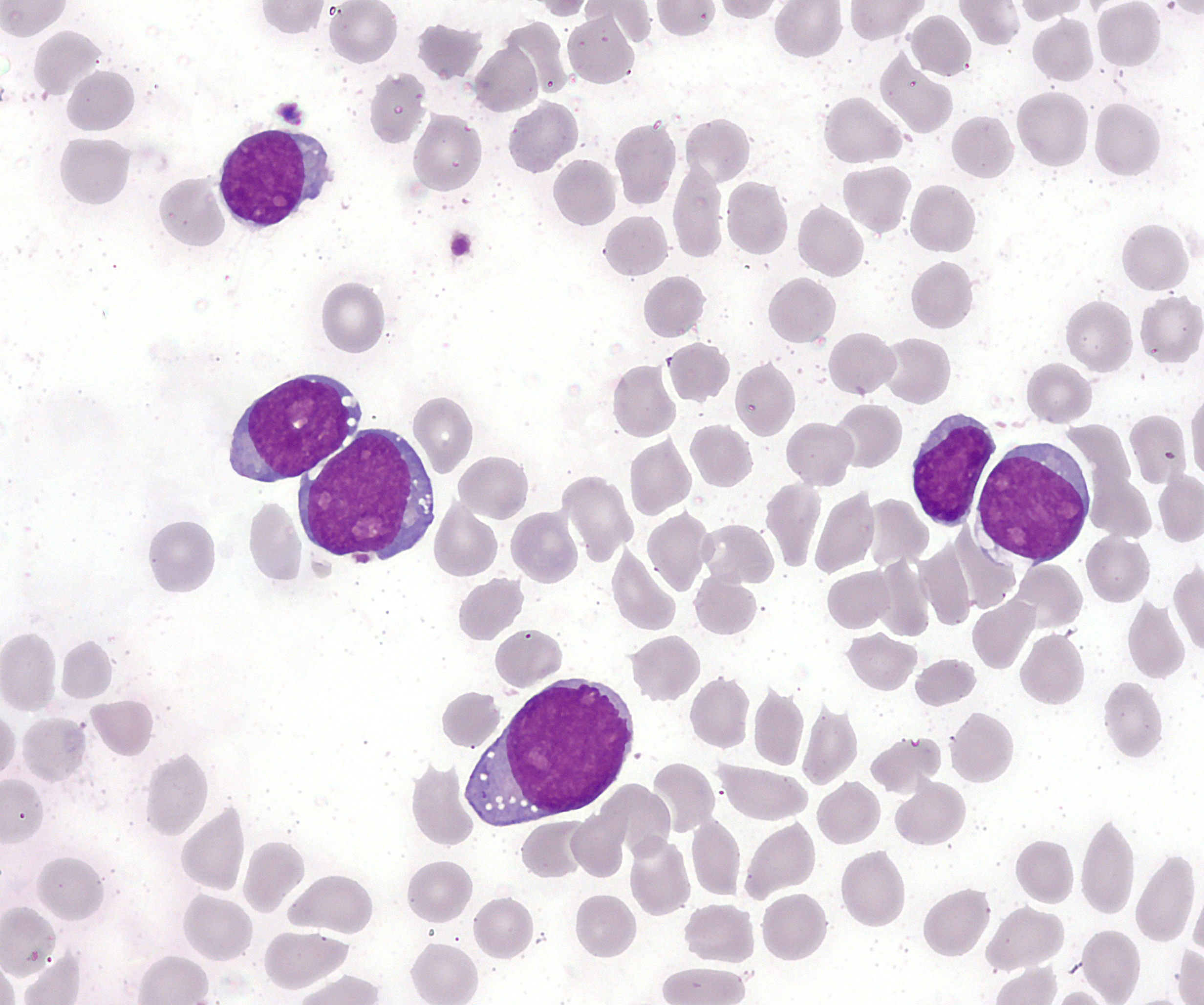
T-lymphoblastic cells of acute leukemia in the bone marrow

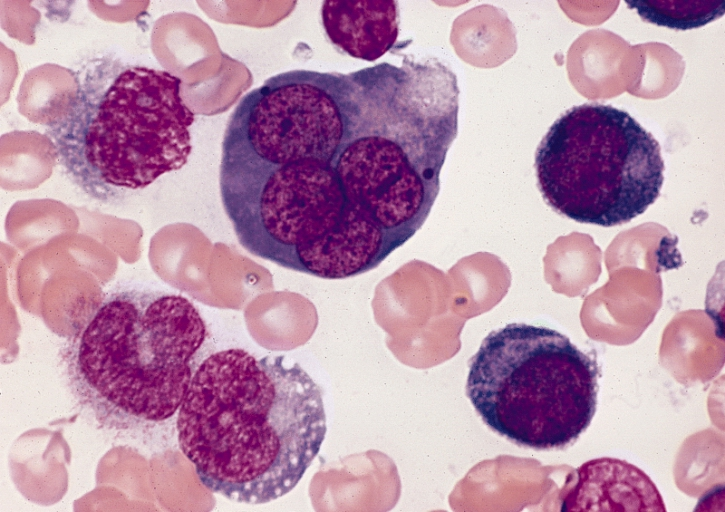
Acute erythroid leukemia, a rare form of acute myeloid leukemia

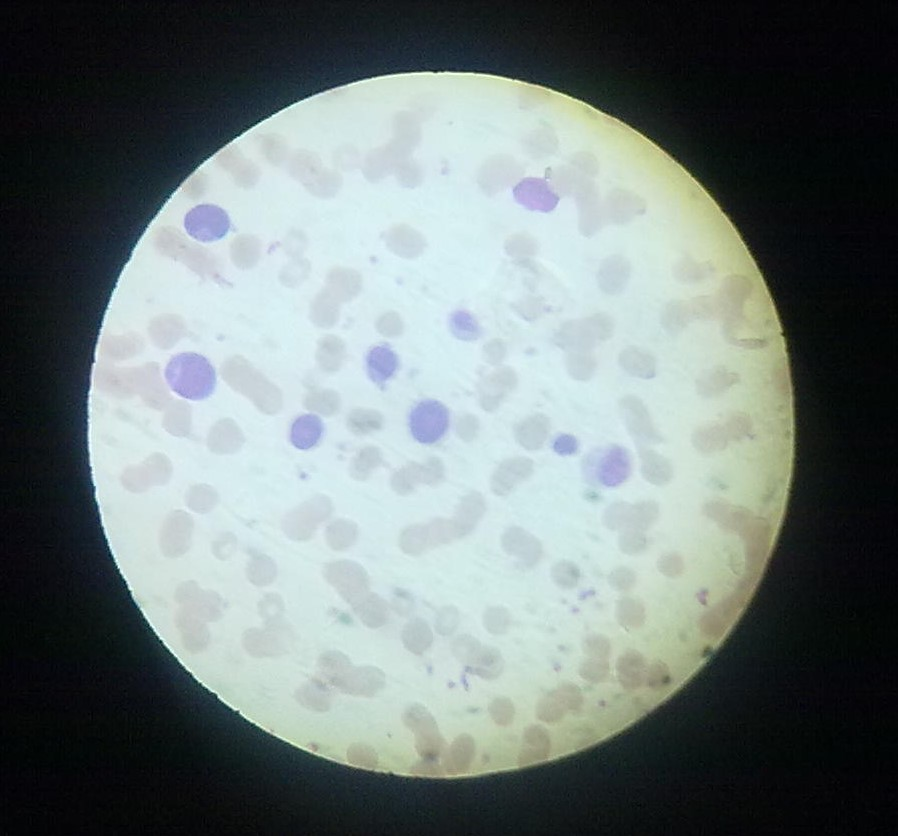
Acute myeloid leukemia

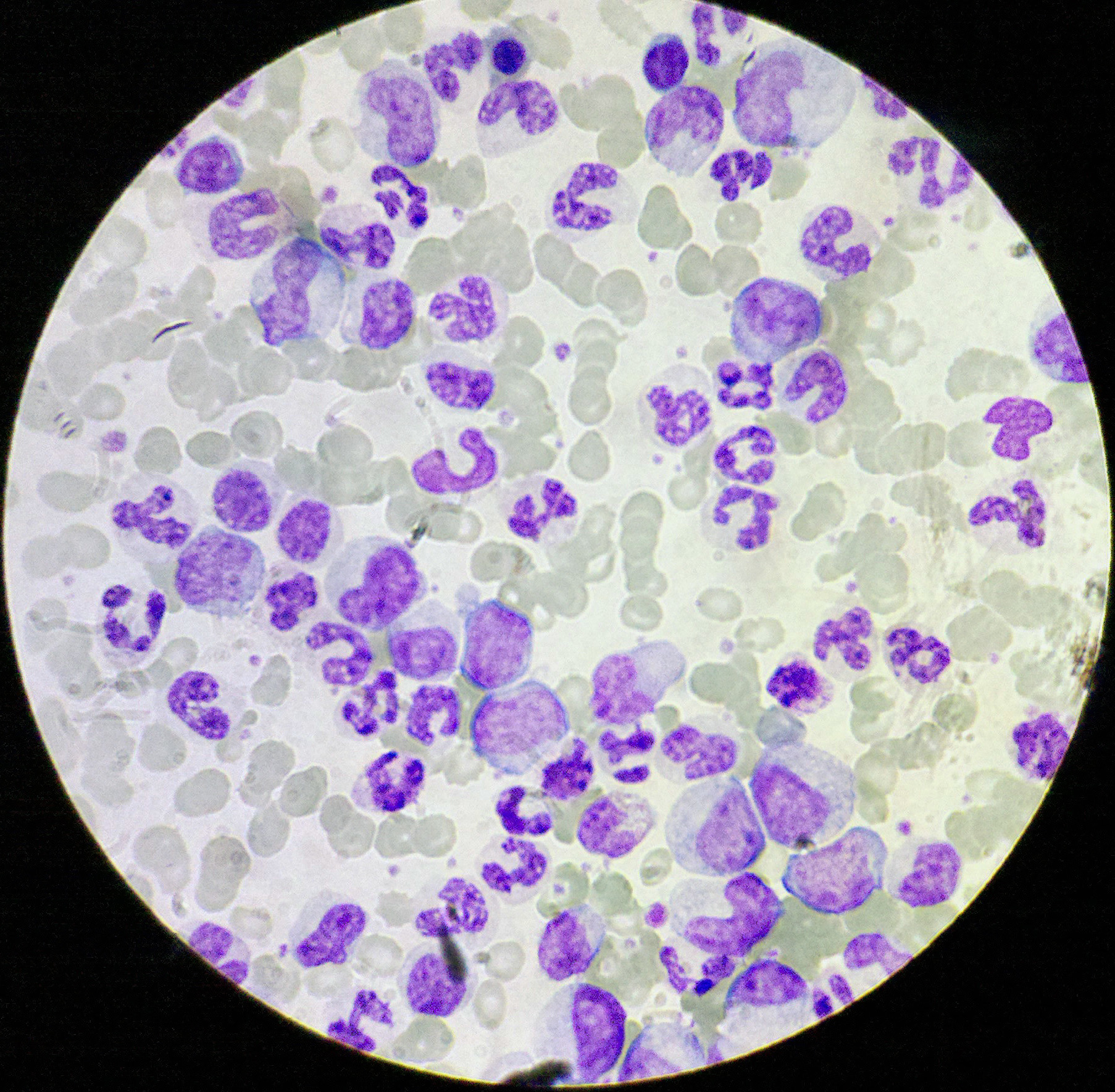
Chronic myelogenous leukemia

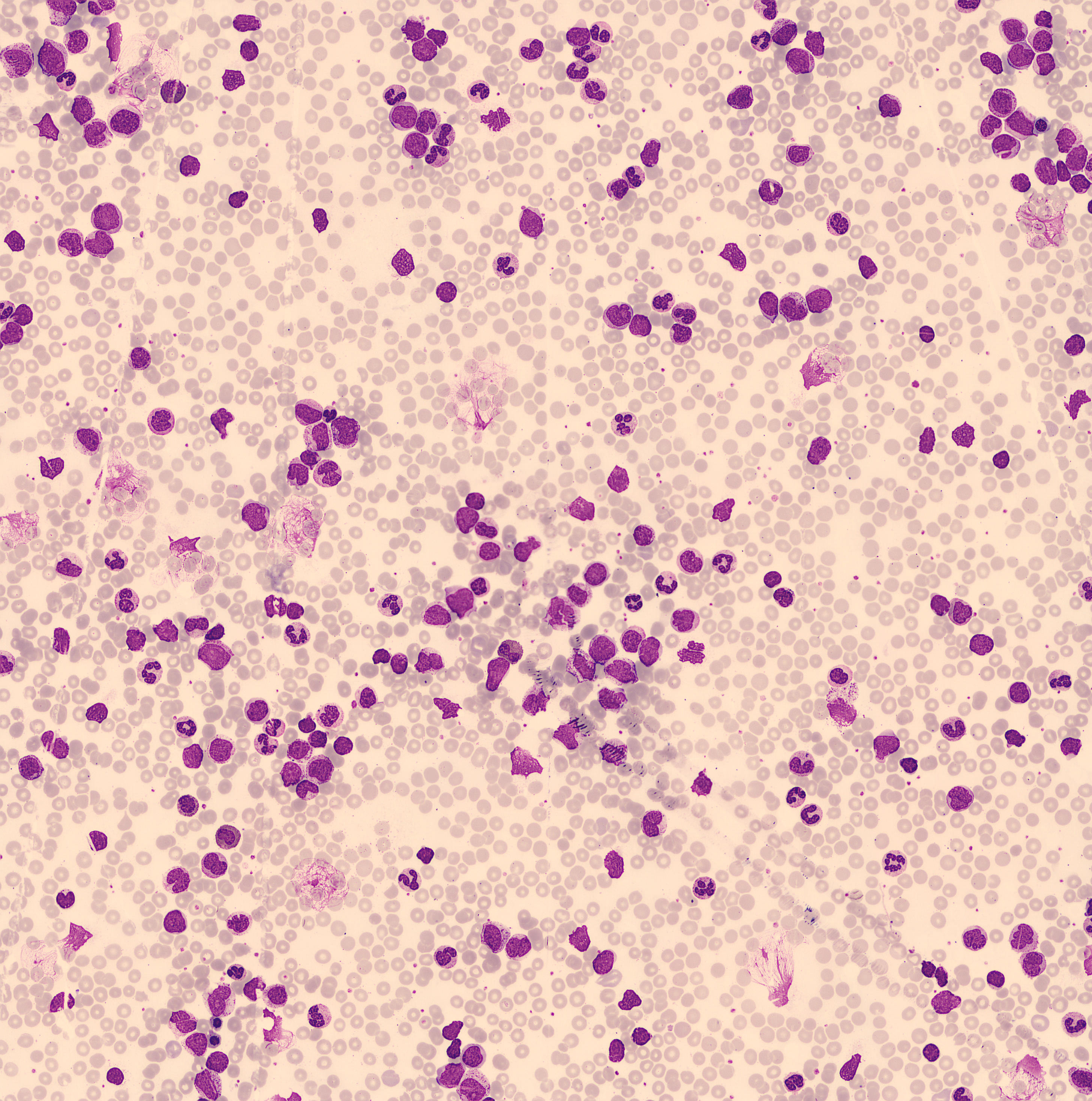
Peripheral blood stain of chronic myelogenous leukemia in accelerated phase (blast crisis)
