= Neutrophilia =

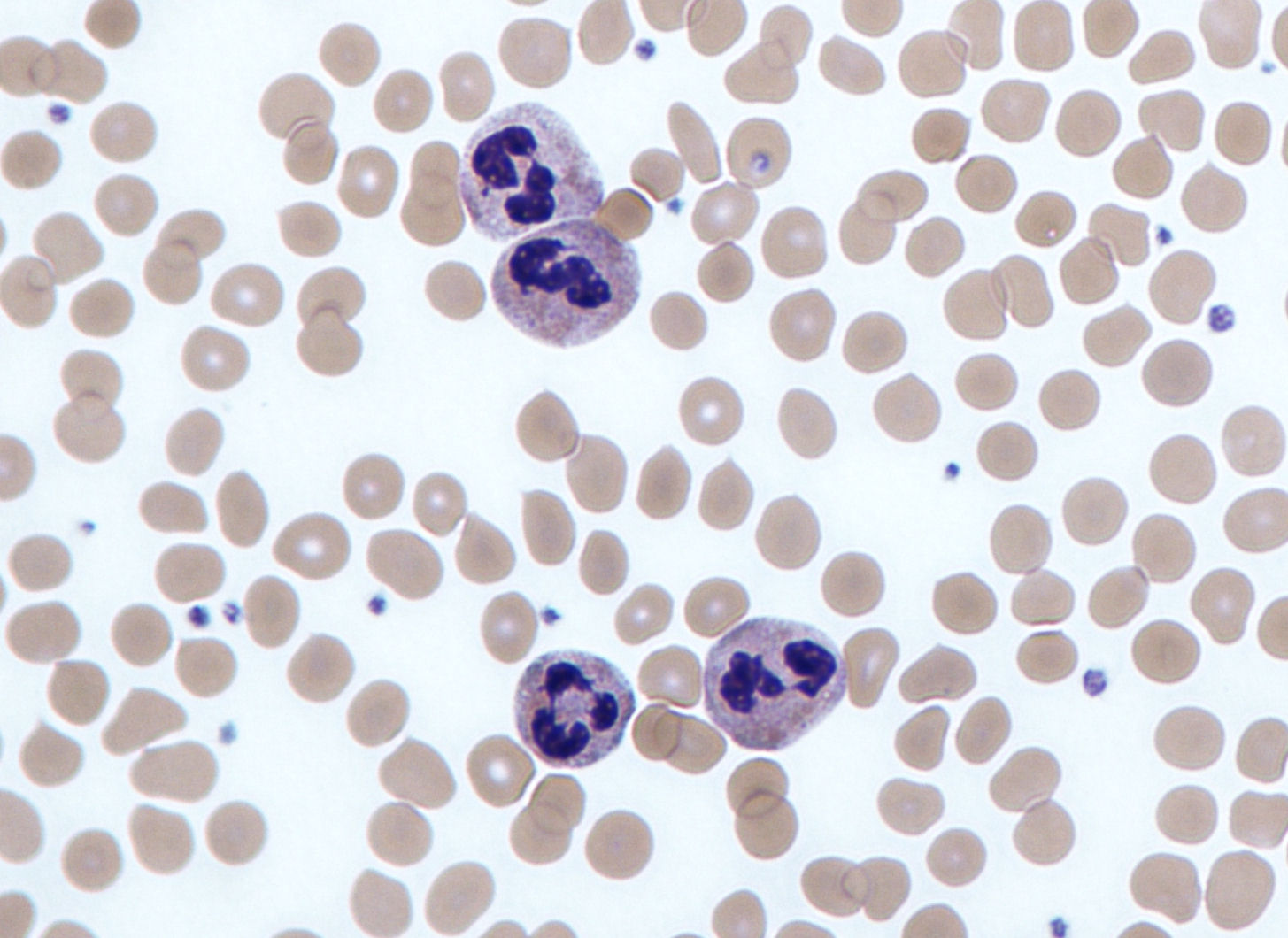
- Neutrophils with a segmented nuclei surrounded by erythrocytes, the intra-cellular granules are visible in the cytoplasm (Giemsa stained)

Neutrophilia (also called neutrophil leukocytosis or occasionally neutrocytosis) is leukocytosis of neutrophils, that is, a high number of neutrophils in the blood. Because neutrophils are the main type of granulocytes, mentions of granulocytosis often overlap in meaning with neutrophilia.

The opposite of neutrophilia is neutropenia.

== Causes ==
Neutrophils are the primary white blood cells that respond to a bacterial infection, so the most common cause of neutrophilia is a bacterial infection, especially pyogenic infections.

Neutrophils are also increased in any acute inflammation, so will be raised after a heart attack, other infarct or burns.

Some drugs, such as prednisone, have the same effect as cortisol and adrenaline (epinephrine), causing marginated neutrophils to enter the blood stream. Overdoses of some drugs can cause very high levels of neutrophils in the blood. There is a single case report of severe neutrophilia with bupropion overdose.

A neutrophilia might also be the result of a malignancy. Chronic myelogenous leukemia (CML or chronic myeloid leukaemia) is a disease where the blood cells proliferate out of control. These cells may be neutrophils. Neutrophilia can also be caused by appendicitis and splenectomy.

Primary neutrophilia can additionally be a result of leukocyte adhesion deficiency.

== "Left shift" ==
A "left shift" refers to the presence of increased proportions of younger, less well differentiated neutrophils and neutrophil-precursor cells in the blood. This generally reflects early or premature release of myeloid cells from the bone marrow, the site where neutrophils are generated. A severe neutrophilia with left shift is referred to as a leukemoid reaction. The leukocyte alkaline phosphatase (LAP) score, which refers to the amount of alkaline phosphatase per neutrophil, will increase. In a severe infection, toxic granulation changes happen to the neutrophils.

This can resemble Pelger-Huet anomaly.

== See also ==
- Absolute neutrophil count
