= Bone marrow examination =

Form of pathologic analysis

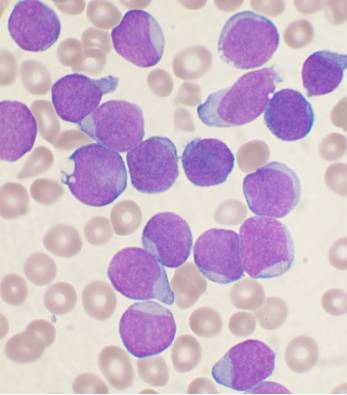
- A Wright's stained bone marrow aspirate smear from a patient with leukemia
- MeSH: D001856

Bone marrow examination refers to the pathologic analysis of samples of bone marrow obtained by bone marrow biopsy (often called trephine biopsy) and bone marrow aspiration. Bone marrow examination is used in the diagnosis of several conditions, including leukemia, multiple myeloma, lymphoma, anemia, and pancytopenia. The bone marrow produces the cellular elements of the blood, including platelets, red blood cells, and white blood cells. While much information can be gleaned by testing the blood itself (drawn from a vein by phlebotomy), it is sometimes necessary to examine the source of the blood cells in the bone marrow to obtain more information on hematopoiesis; this is the role of bone marrow aspiration and biopsy.

== Components of the procedure ==
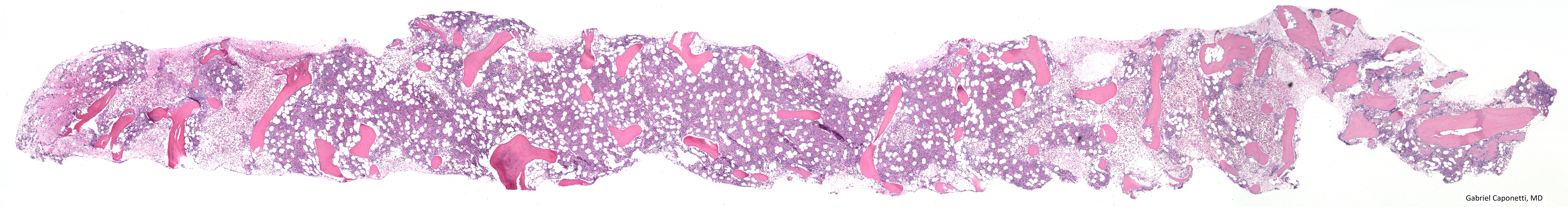
Section of bone marrow core biopsy as seen under the microscope (stained with H&E).

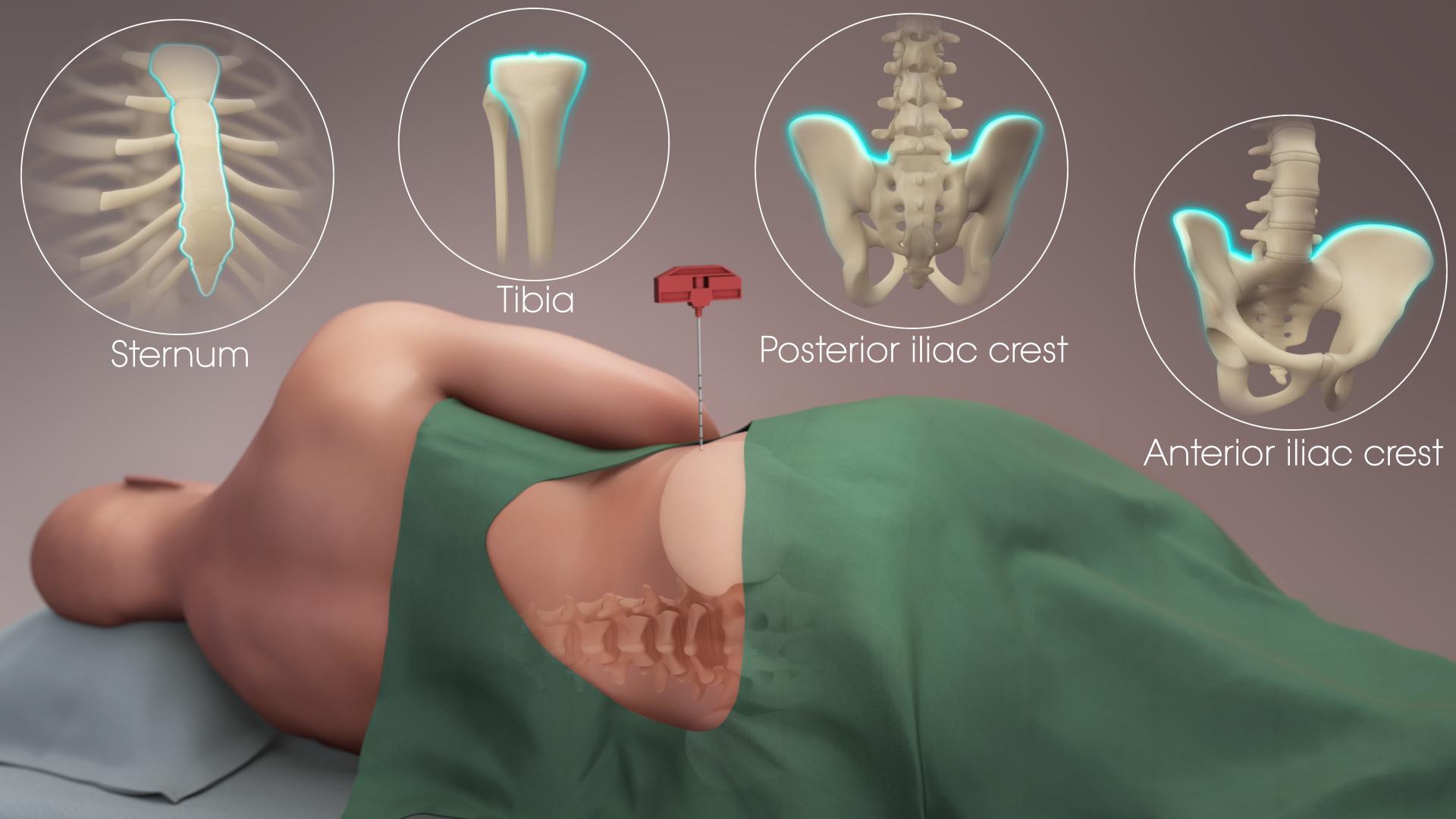
The preferred sites for the procedure

Bone marrow samples can be obtained by aspiration and trephine biopsy. Sometimes, a bone marrow examination will include both an aspirate and a biopsy. The aspirate yields semi-liquid bone marrow, which can be examined by a pathologist under a light microscope and analyzed by flow cytometry, chromosome analysis, or polymerase chain reaction (PCR). Frequently, a trephine biopsy is also obtained, which yields a narrow, cylindrically shaped solid piece of bone marrow, 2 mm wide and 2 cm long (80 μL), which is examined microscopically (sometimes with the aid of immunohistochemistry) for cellularity and infiltrative processes. An aspiration, using a 20 mL syringe, yields approximately 300 μL of bone marrow. A volume greater than 300 μL is not recommended, since it may dilute the sample with peripheral blood.

Comparison
	Aspiration	Biopsy
Advantages	Fast; Gives the relative quantity of different cell types; Gives material to further study, e.g. molecular genetics and flow cytometry	Gives cell and stroma constitution; Represents all cells; Explains cause of "dry tap" (aspiration gives no blood cells)
Drawbacks	Does not represent all cells	Slow processing

Aspiration does not always represent all cells since some, such as lymphoma, stick to the trabecula, and would thus be missed by a simple aspiration.

== Site of procedure ==
Bone marrow aspiration and trephine biopsy are usually performed on the back of the hipbone, or posterior iliac crest. An aspirate can also be obtained from the sternum (breastbone). For the sternal aspirate, the patient lies on their back, with a pillow under the shoulder to raise the chest. A trephine biopsy should never be performed on the sternum, due to the risk of injury to blood vessels, lungs, or the heart. Bone marrow aspiration may also be performed on the tibial (shinbone) site in children up to 2 years of age, while spinous process aspiration is frequently done in a lumbar puncture position and on the L3-L4 vertebrae.

Anesthesia is used to reduce surface pain at the spot where the needle is inserted. Pain may result from the procedure's insult to the marrow, which cannot be anesthetized, as well as short periods of pain from the anesthetic process itself. The experience is not uniform; different patients report different levels of pain, and some do not report any pain at certain expected points.

== Test performance ==
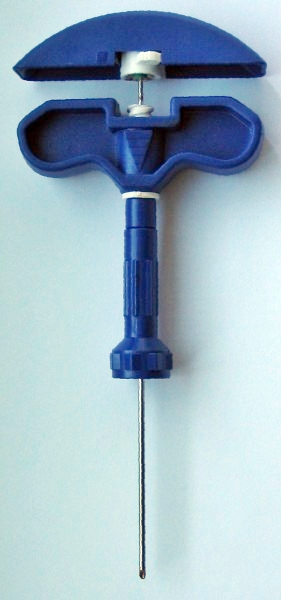
A needle used for bone marrow aspiration, with removable stylet.

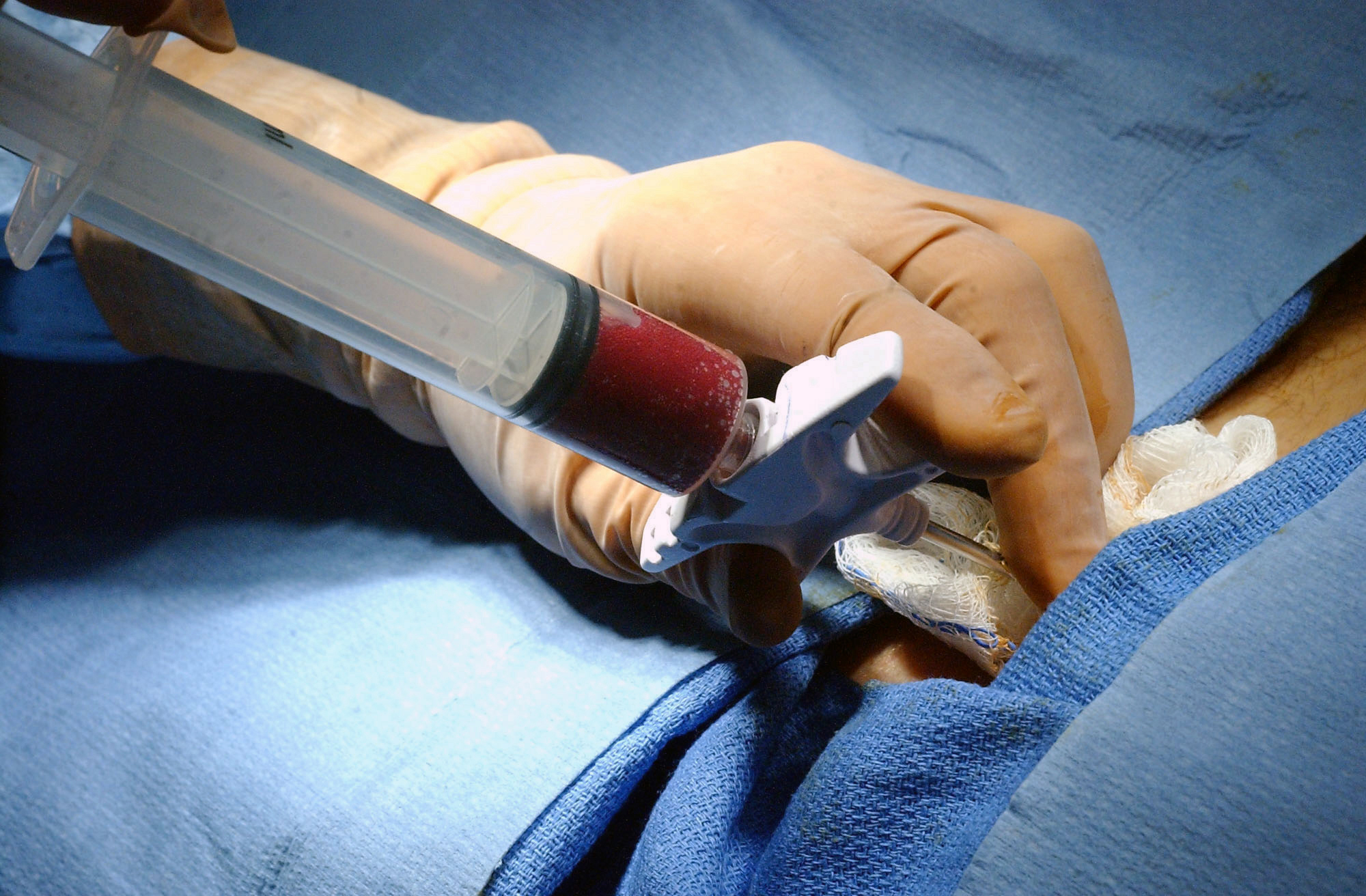
Bone marrow aspirate.

A bone marrow biopsy may be done in a health care provider's office or in a hospital. Informed consent for the procedure is typically required. The patient is asked to lie on their abdomen (prone position) or on their side (lateral decubitus position). The skin is cleansed, and a local anesthetic such as lidocaine or procaine is injected to numb the area. Patients may also be pretreated with analgesics and/or anti-anxiety medications, although this is not a routine practice.

Typically, the aspirate is performed first. An aspirating needle is inserted through the skin using manual pressure and force until it hits the bone. Then, with a twisting motion of the clinician's hand and wrist, the needle is advanced through the bony cortex (the hard outer layer of the bone) and into the marrow cavity. Once the needle is in the marrow cavity, a syringe is attached and used to aspirate ("suck out") liquid bone marrow. A twisting motion is performed during the aspiration to avoid excess blood content in the sample, which might be the case if an excessively large sample from one single point is taken. Subsequently, the biopsy is performed if indicated. A different, larger trephine needle is inserted and anchored in the bony cortex. The needle is then advanced with a twisting motion and rotated to obtain a solid piece of bone marrow. This piece is then removed along with the needle. The entire procedure, once preparation is complete, typically takes 10–15 minutes.

If several samples are taken, the needle is removed between the samples to avoid blood coagulation.

After the procedure is complete, the patient is typically asked to lie flat for 5–10 minutes to provide pressure over the procedure site. After that, assuming no bleeding is observed, the patient can get up and go about their normal activities. Paracetamol (aka acetaminophen) or other simple analgesics can be used to ease soreness, which is common for 2–3 days after the procedure. Any worsening pain, redness, fever, bleeding, or swelling may suggest a complication. Patients are also advised to avoid washing the procedure site for at least 24 hours after the procedure is completed.

== Contraindications ==
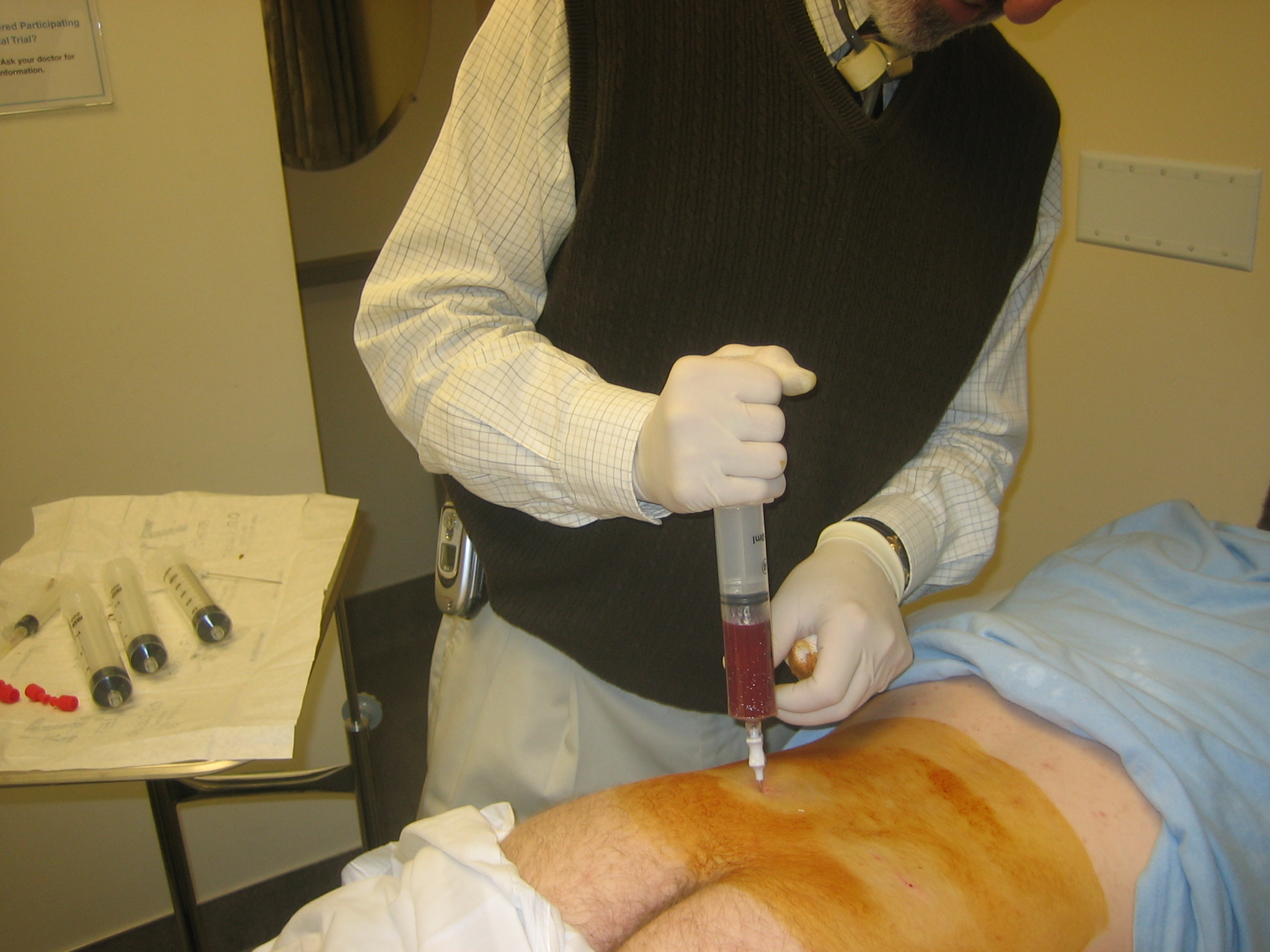
A volunteer donating bone marrow for scientific research.

There are a few contraindications to bone marrow examination. Thrombocytopenia or bleeding disorders are not contraindications as long as the procedure is performed by a skilled clinician. Bone marrow aspiration and biopsy can be safely performed even in the setting of extreme thrombocytopenia (low platelet count). If there is a skin or soft tissue infection over the hip, a different site should be chosen for bone marrow examination.

== Complications ==
While mild soreness lasting 12–24 hours is common after a bone marrow examination, serious complications are extremely rare. In a large review, an estimated 55,000 bone marrow examinations were performed, with 26 serious adverse events (0.05%), including one fatality. The same author collected data on over 19,000 bone marrow examinations performed in the United Kingdom in 2003, and found 16 adverse events (0.08% of total procedures), the most common of which was bleeding. In this report, complications, while rare, were serious in individual cases.

== Reference ranges for white blood cells in bone marrow ==
	Range (%)	Reference range (%)	Median (%)	Mean (%)
Erythroblasts (total)	8.5–56.5	15.8–46.2	32	31.7
Male	11.0–54.5	16.2–46.6	33	32.4
Female	8.5–56.5	15.6–45.0	29.5	30.1
Proerythroblast	0–5.0	0–3.0	0.5	0.6
Basophilic	0–21.0	0.5–13.5	3.5	4.5
Polychromatophilic	3.0–47.0	7.8–34.5	20	20.2
Orthochromatic	0–21.0	0.5–16.5	5.5	6.3
Granulocytes (total)	24.5–72.5	34.8–66.3	49.5	49.9
Male	26.0–70.5	35.5–64.5	49.5	49.7
Female	24.5–72.5	34.1–67.4	50	50.5
Neutrophils (total)				
Myeloblast	0–8.5	0–5.0	1.5	1.6
Promyelocyte	0–8.5	0–5.5	1	1.3
Myelocyte	1.0–31.7	5.8–24.0	13.5	13.7
Metamyelocyte	0.5–18.0	1.0–12.0	4.5	5
Band	2.0–34.0	6.5–26.2	14.5	15.2
Segmented	1.0–27.5	2.5–19.7	9.5	9.8
Eosinophils (total)	0–18.0	0.5–7.0	2.5	3
Basophils (and mast cells)	0–3.0	0–1.5	0	0.3
GE-ratio	0.5–5.9	0.8–4.1	1.6	1.7
Monocytes	0–8.5	0–6.0	2	2.2
ME ratio	0.6–6.2	0.8–4.1	1.6	1.8
Male	0.6–6.1	0.8–4.0	1.6	1.8
Female	0.6–6.2	0.8–4.2	1.7	2
Lymphocytes	1.0–38.5	5.5–23.2	13.2	13.6
Plasma cells	0–17.5	0–7.0	2.3	2.6

== See also ==
- Bone biopsy
- Biopsy
- Fine-needle aspiration
