= Inclusion bodies =

Aggregates of specific proteins in neurons and tissues

Inclusion bodies are typically aggregates of specific types of protein found in neurons, and a number of tissue cells including red blood cells, bacteria, viruses, and plants. Inclusion bodies of aggregations of multiple proteins are also found in muscle cells affected by inclusion body myositis and hereditary inclusion body myopathy.

Inclusion bodies in neurons may accumulate in the cytoplasm or nucleus, and are associated with many neurodegenerative diseases. Inclusion bodies in neurodegenerative diseases are aggregates of misfolded proteins (aggresomes) and are hallmarks of many of these diseases, including Lewy bodies in dementia with Lewy bodies, and Parkinson's disease, neuroserpin inclusion bodies called Collins bodies in familial encephalopathy with neuroserpin inclusion bodies, inclusion bodies in Huntington's disease, Papp–Lantos bodies in multiple system atrophy, and various inclusion bodies in frontotemporal dementia including Pick bodies. Bunina bodies in motor neurons are a core feature of amyotrophic lateral sclerosis.

Other usual cell inclusions are often temporary inclusions of accumulated proteins, fats, secretory granules, or other insoluble components. A typical finding in the lung tissue of tobacco smokers are pigmented cytoplasmic granules shown in macrophages known as smoker's inclusion bodies.

Inclusion bodies are found in bacteria as particles of aggregated protein. They have a higher density than many other cell components but are porous. They typically represent sites of viral multiplication in a bacterium or a eukaryotic cell and usually consist of viral capsid proteins. Inclusion bodies contain very little host protein, ribosomal components, or DNA/RNA fragments. They often almost exclusively contain the over-expressed protein and aggregation and has been reported to be reversible. It has been suggested that inclusion bodies are dynamic structures formed by an unbalanced equilibrium between aggregated and soluble proteins of Escherichia coli. There is a growing body of information indicating that formation of inclusion bodies occurs as a result of intracellular accumulation of partially folded expressed proteins which aggregate through non-covalent hydrophobic or ionic interactions or a combination of both.

== Composition ==
Protein inclusion bodies are classically thought to contain misfolded protein. However, this has been contested, as green fluorescent protein will sometimes fluoresce in inclusion bodies, which indicates some resemblance of the native structure and researchers have recovered folded protein from inclusion bodies. Some inclusion bodies have a non-unit (single) lipid membrane, and are referred to as lipid inclusions. These are often cellular organelles, used for storage of various proteins..

== Mechanism of formation ==
When genes from one organism are expressed in another organism the resulting protein sometimes forms inclusion bodies. This is often true when large evolutionary distances are crossed: a cDNA isolated from Eukarya for example, and expressed as a recombinant gene in a prokaryote risks the formation of the inactive aggregates of protein known as inclusion bodies. While the cDNA may properly code for a translatable mRNA, the protein that results will emerge in a foreign microenvironment. This often has fatal effects, especially if the intent of cloning is to produce a biologically active protein. For example, eukaryotic systems for carbohydrate modification and membrane transport are not found in prokaryotes. The internal microenvironment of a prokaryotic cell (pH, osmolarity) may differ from that of the original source of the gene. Mechanisms for folding a protein may also be absent, and hydrophobic residues that normally would remain buried may be exposed and available for interaction with similar exposed sites on other ectopic proteins. Processing systems for the cleavage and removal of internal peptides would also be absent in bacteria. The initial attempts to clone insulin in a bacterium suffered all of these deficits. In addition, the fine controls that may keep the concentration of a protein low will also be missing in a prokaryotic cell, and overexpression can result in filling a cell with ectopic protein that, even if it were properly folded, would precipitate by saturating its environment.

== In neurons ==
Inclusion bodies are aggregates of protein associated with many neurodegenerative diseases, accumulated in the cytoplasm or nucleus of neurons. Inclusion bodies of aggregations of multiple proteins are also found in muscle cells affected by inclusion body myositis and hereditary inclusion body myopathy.

Inclusion bodies in neurodegenerative diseases are aggregates of misfolded proteins (aggresomes) and are hallmarks of many of these diseases, including Lewy bodies in Lewy body dementias, and Parkinson's disease, neuroserpin inclusion bodies called Collins bodies in familial encephalopathy with neuroserpin inclusion bodies, inclusion bodies in Huntington's disease, Papp-Lantos inclusions in multiple system atrophy, and various inclusion bodies in frontotemporal dementia including Pick bodies. Bunina bodies in motor neurons are a core feature of amyotrophic lateral sclerosis.

== In red blood cells ==
A red blood cell (erythrocyte) does not usually have inclusions in the cytoplasm, but they may be seen in certain blood disorders.

There are three kinds of red blood cell inclusions:

1. Developmental organelles
  1. Howell-Jolly bodies: small, round fragments of the nucleus resulting from karyorrhexis or nuclear disintegration of the late reticulocyte and stain reddish-blue with Wright's stain.
  2. Basophilic stipplings – these stipplings are either fine or coarse, deep blue to purple staining inclusion that appear on a dried Wright's stain.
  3. Pappenheimer bodies – are siderotic granules which are small, irregular, dark-staining granules that appear near the periphery of a young erythrocyte in a Wright's stain.
  4. Polychromatophilic red cells – young red blood cells that no longer have nucleus but still contain some RNA.
  5. Cabot rings – ring-like structure and may appear in red blood cells in megaloblastic anemia or in severe anemias, lead poisoning, and in dyserythropoiesis, in which erythrocytes are destroyed before being released from the bone marrow.
2. Abnormal hemoglobin precipitation
  1. Heinz bodies – round bodies, refractile inclusions not visible on a Wright's stain film. They are best identified by supravital staining with basic dyes.
  2. Hemoglobin H inclusions – alpha thalassemia, greenish-blue inclusion bodies appear in many red blood cells after four drops of blood are incubated with 0.5mL of Brilliant cresyl blue for 20 minutes at 37 °C.
3. Protozoan inclusion
  1. Malaria
  2. Babesia

== In white blood cells ==
- Barr body
- Critical green inclusion
- Döhle bodies
- Howell-Jolly body-like inclusions (HJBLi)
- Russell bodies are inclusions of immunoglobulin found in atypical plasma cells. Russell bodies clump together in large numbers displacing the cell nucleus to the edge, and the cell is then called a Mott cell.

== In viruses ==
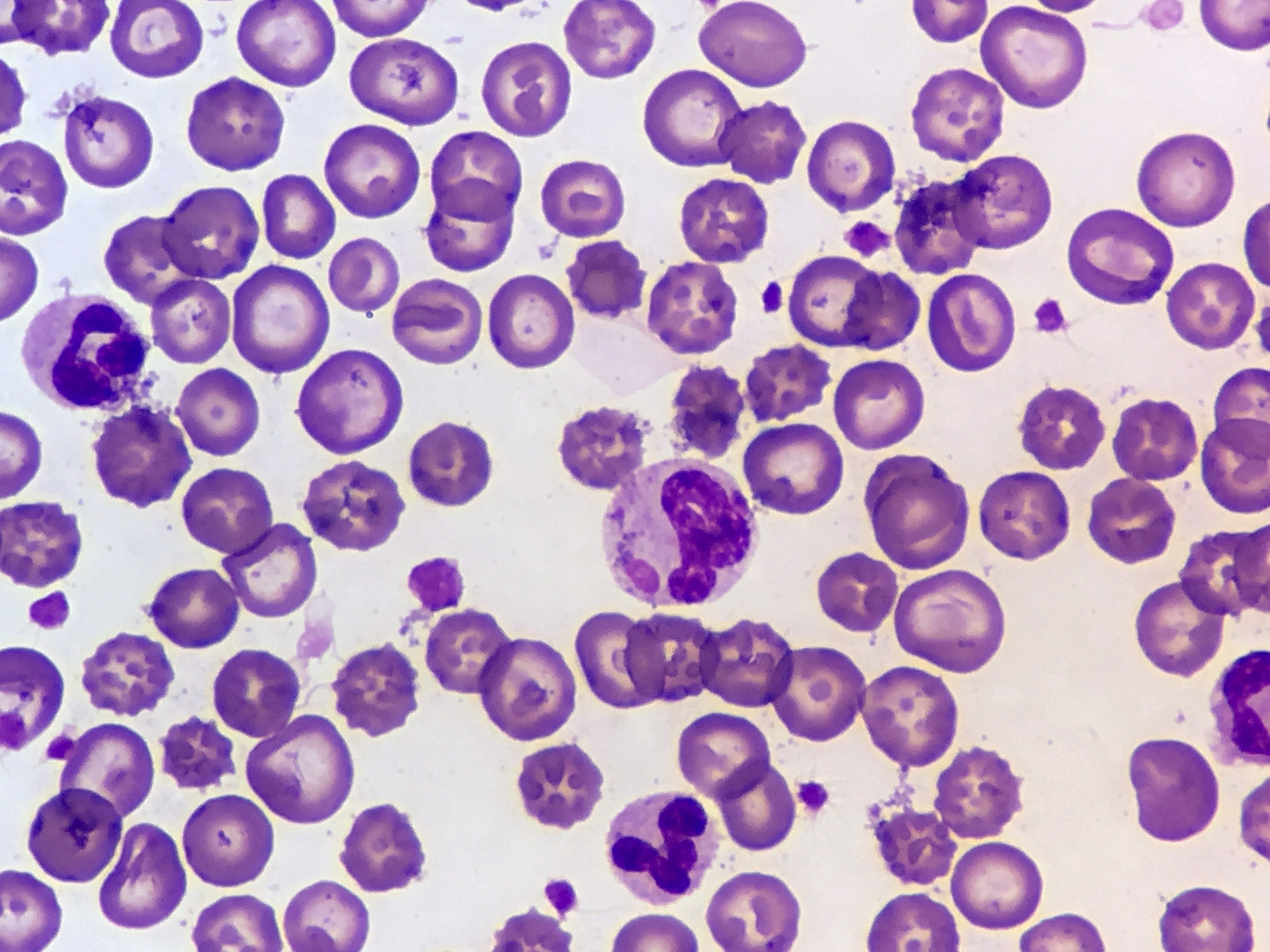
Canine distemper virus with cytoplasmic inclusion body (blood smear, Wright's stain)

Examples of viral inclusion bodies in humans and other animals are

Cytoplasmic eosinophilic (acidophilic)-

- Negri bodies in rabies
- Orthopoxvirus inclusion bodies – Guarnieri bodies, and Paschen bodies in certain poxviruses, and Type-A inclusion bodies including Downie bodies only in cowpox
- Bollinger bodies in fowlpox
- Molluscum bodies in Molluscum contagiosum
- Eosinophilic inclusion bodies in boid inclusion body disease

Nuclear eosinophilic (acidophilic)-

- Cowdry bodies type A in Herpes simplex virus and Varicella zoster virus
- Torres bodies in yellow fever
- Cowdry bodies type B in polio and adenovirus

Nuclear basophilic-

- Cowdry bodies type B in adenovirus
- "Owl's eye appearance" in cytomegalovirus

Both nuclear and cytoplasmic-

- Warthin–Finkeldey bodies in measles and HIV/AIDS

Examples of viral inclusion bodies in plants include aggregations of virus particles (like those for Cucumber mosaic virus) and aggregations of viral proteins (like the cylindrical inclusions of potyviruses). Depending on the plant and the plant virus family these inclusions can be found in epidermal cells, mesophyll cells, and stomatal cells when plant tissue is properly stained.

== In bacteria ==
Polyhydroxyalkanoates (PHA) are produced by bacteria as inclusion bodies. The size of PHA granules are limited in E. coli, due to its small size. Bacterial cell's inclusion bodies are not as abundant intracellularly, in comparison to eukaryotic cells.

Polymeric R bodies are found in the bacterial cytoplasm of some taxa, and thought to be involved in toxin delivery.

=== Isolation of proteins ===
Between 70% and 80% of recombinant proteins expressed E. coli are contained in inclusion bodies (i.e., protein aggregates). The purification of the expressed proteins from inclusion bodies usually require two main steps: extraction of inclusion bodies from the bacteria followed by the solubilisation of the purified inclusion bodies. Solubilisation of inclusions bodies often involves treatment with denaturing agents, such as urea or guanidine chloride at high concentrations, to de-aggregate the collapsed proteins. Renaturation follows the treatment with denaturing agents and often consists of dialysis and/or use of molecules that promote the refolding of denatured proteins (including chaotopic agents and chaperones).

== Pseudo-inclusions ==
Pseudo-inclusions are invaginations of the cytoplasm into the cell nuclei, which may give the appearance of intranuclear inclusions. They may appear in papillary thyroid carcinoma.

== Diseases involving inclusion bodies ==
| Disease | Affected cells |
|---|---|
| Inclusion body myositis | muscle cells |
| Amyotrophic lateral sclerosis | motor neurons |
| Dementia with Lewy bodies | cerebral neurons |

Inclusion body diseases differ from amyloid diseases in that inclusion bodies are necessarily intracellular aggregates of protein, where amyloid can be intracellular or extracellular. Amyloid also necessitates protein polymerization where inclusion bodies do not.

== Preventing inclusion bodies in bacteria ==
Inclusion bodies are often made of denatured aggregates of inactive proteins. Although, the renaturation of inclusion bodies can sometimes lead to the solubilisation and the recovery of active proteins, the process is still very empirical, uncertain and of low efficiency. Several techniques have been developed over the years to prevent the formation of inclusion bodies. These techniques include:

- The use of weaker promoters to slowdown the rate of protein expression
- The use of low copy number plasmids
- The co-expression of chaperone (such as GroES-GroEL and DnaK-DnaJ-GrpE)
- The use of specific E. coli strains such as (AD494 and Origami)
- Fusing the target protein to a soluble partner
- Lowering the expression temperature

== See also ==
- Adult polyglucosan body disease
- Asteroid body
- Birbeck granules
- Ferruginous body
- JUNQ and IPOD
- Maltose-binding protein
- Nuclear bodies
- P-bodies
- Reinke crystals
- Schaumann body
- Stress granules
