= Smallpox =

Eradicated viral disease

- Other names: variola, variola vera, pox, red plague
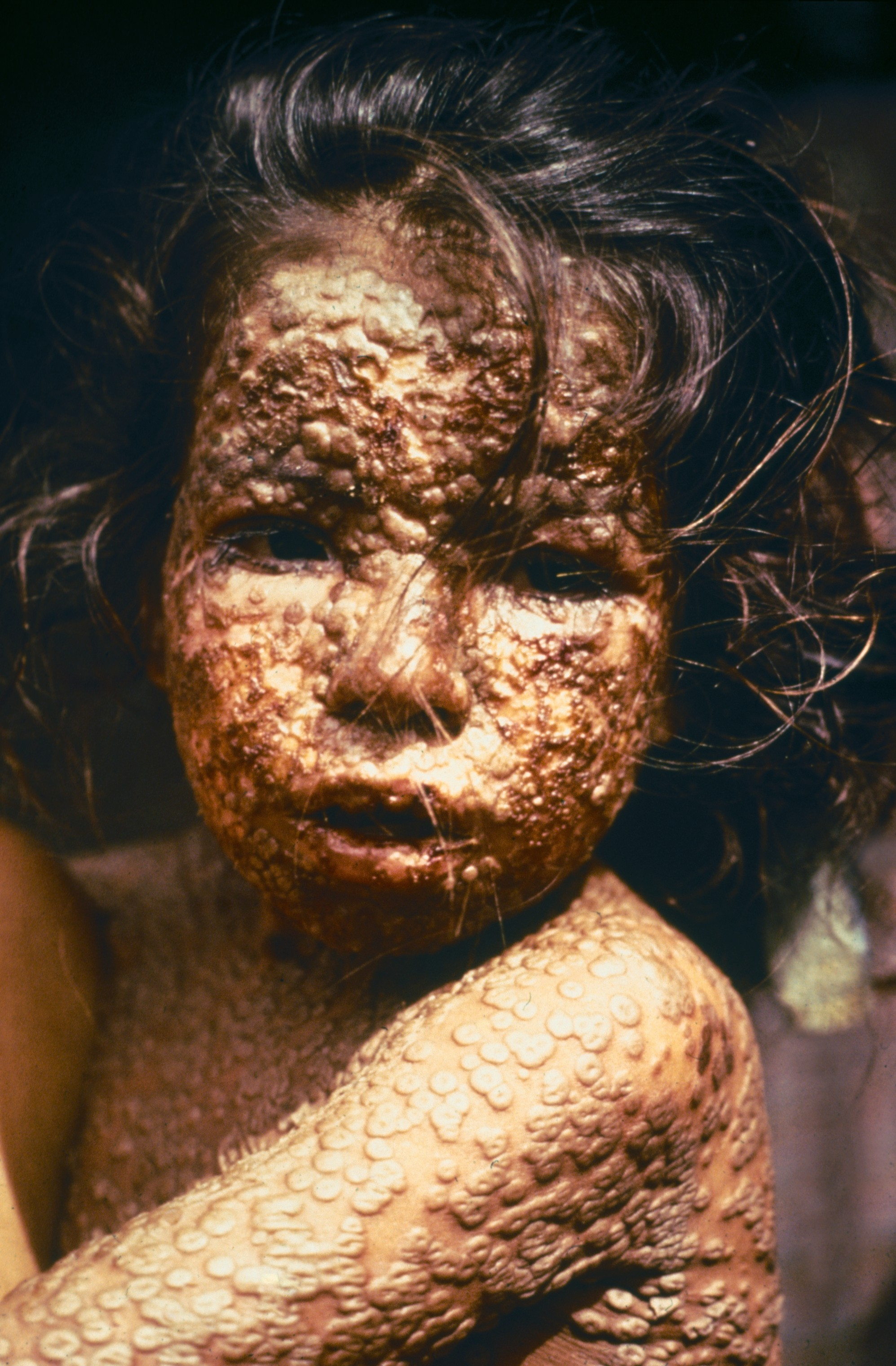
- A child with smallpox in Bangladesh in 1973. The bumps filled with thick fluid and a depression or dimple in the center are characteristic.
- Specialty: Infectious disease
- Symptoms: Early: Fever, vomiting, mouth sores; Later: Fluid filled blisters which scab over
- Complications: Scarring of the skin, blindness
- Usual onset: 1 to 3 weeks following exposure
- Duration: About 4 weeks
- Causes: variola major virus, variola minor virus (spread between people)
- Diagnostic method: Based on symptoms and confirmed by PCR
- Differential diagnosis: Chickenpox, impetigo, molluscum contagiosum, mpox
- Prevention: Smallpox vaccine
- Treatment: Supportive care
- Medication: Brincidofovir
- Prognosis: 30% risk of death
- Frequency: Eradicated (last naturally occurring case in 1977)

Smallpox was an infectious disease caused by the variola virus, which belongs to the genus Orthopoxvirus. The last naturally occurring case was diagnosed in October 1977, and the World Health Organization certified the global eradication of the disease in 1980, making smallpox the only human disease to have been eradicated.

The initial symptoms of the disease included fever and vomiting. This was followed by formation of ulcers in the mouth and a skin rash. Over a number of days, the skin rash turned into the characteristic fluid-filled blisters with a dent in the center. The bumps then scabbed over and fell off, leaving scars. The disease was transmitted from one person to another primarily through prolonged face-to-face contact with an infected person or rarely via contaminated objects. Prevention was achieved mainly through the smallpox vaccine. Once the disease had developed, certain antiviral medications could have helped, but such medications did not become available until after the disease was eradicated. The risk of death was about 30%, with higher rates among babies. Often, those who survived had extensive scarring of their skin, and some were left blind.

The earliest evidence of the disease dates to around 1500 BCE in Egyptian mummies. The disease historically occurred in outbreaks. It was one of several diseases introduced by the Columbian exchange to the New World, resulting in large swathes of Native Americans dying. In 18th-century Europe, it is estimated that 400,000 people died from the disease per year, and that one-third of all cases of blindness were due to smallpox. Smallpox is estimated to have killed up to 300 million people in the 20th century and around 500 million people in the last 100 years of its existence. Earlier deaths included multiple European monarchs. As recently as 1967, 15 million cases occurred a year. Inoculation for smallpox appears to have started in China around the 1500s. Europe adopted this practice from Asia in the first half of the 18th century. In 1796, Edward Jenner introduced the modern smallpox vaccine. In 1967, the World Health Organization intensified efforts to eliminate the disease. Smallpox is one of two infectious diseases to have been eradicated, the other being rinderpest (a disease of even-toed ungulates) in 2011. The term "smallpox" was first used in England in the 16th century to distinguish the disease from syphilis, which was then known as the "great pox". Other historical names for the disease include pox, speckled monster, and red plague.

== Classification ==
There are two forms of the smallpox. Variola major is the severe and more common form, with a more extensive rash and higher fever. Variola minor is a less common presentation, causing less severe disease (discrete smallpox) with historical death rates of 1% or less. Subclinical (asymptomatic) infections with variola were noted but not commonly. In addition, a form called variola sine eruptione (smallpox without rash) was seen mostly in vaccinated persons. This form was marked by a fever that occurred after the usual incubation period and could be confirmed only by antibody studies or, rarely, by viral culture. In addition, there were two very rare and fulminating types of smallpox, the malignant (flat) and hemorrhagic forms, which were usually fatal.

=== Ordinary ===
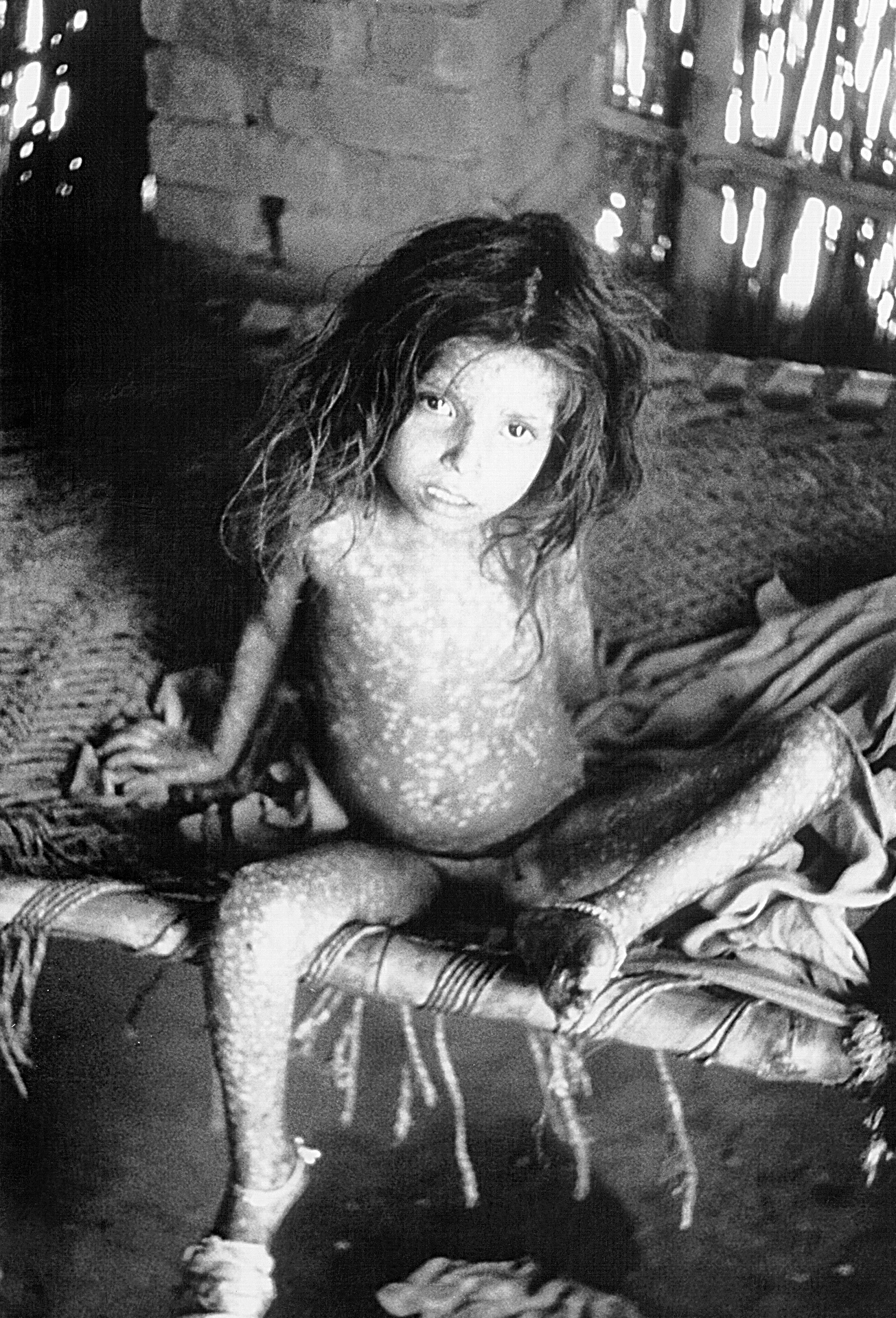
A child showing rash due to ordinary-type smallpox (variola major)

At least 90% of smallpox cases among unvaccinated persons were of the ordinary type. In this form of the disease, by the second day of the rash the macules had become raised papules. By the third or fourth day, the papules had filled with an opalescent fluid to become vesicles. This fluid became opaque and turbid within 24–48 hours, resulting in pustules.

By the sixth or seventh day, all the skin lesions had become pustules. Between seven and ten days the pustules had matured and reached their maximum size. The pustules were sharply raised, typically round, tense, and firm to the touch. The pustules were deeply embedded in the dermis, giving them the feel of a small bead in the skin. Fluid slowly leaked from the pustules, and by the end of the second week, the pustules had deflated and began to dry up, forming crusts or scabs. By day 16–20 scabs had formed over all of the lesions, which had started to flake off, leaving depigmented scars.

Ordinary smallpox generally produced a discrete rash, in which the pustules stood out on the skin separately. The distribution of the rash was most dense on the face, denser on the extremities than on the trunk, and denser on the distal parts of the extremities than on the proximal. The palms of the hands and soles of the feet were involved in most cases.

=== Confluent ===
Sometimes, the blisters merged into sheets, forming a confluent rash, which began to detach the outer layers of skin from the underlying flesh. Patients with confluent smallpox often remained ill even after scabs had formed over all the lesions. In one case series, the case-fatality rate in confluent smallpox was 62%.

=== Modified ===
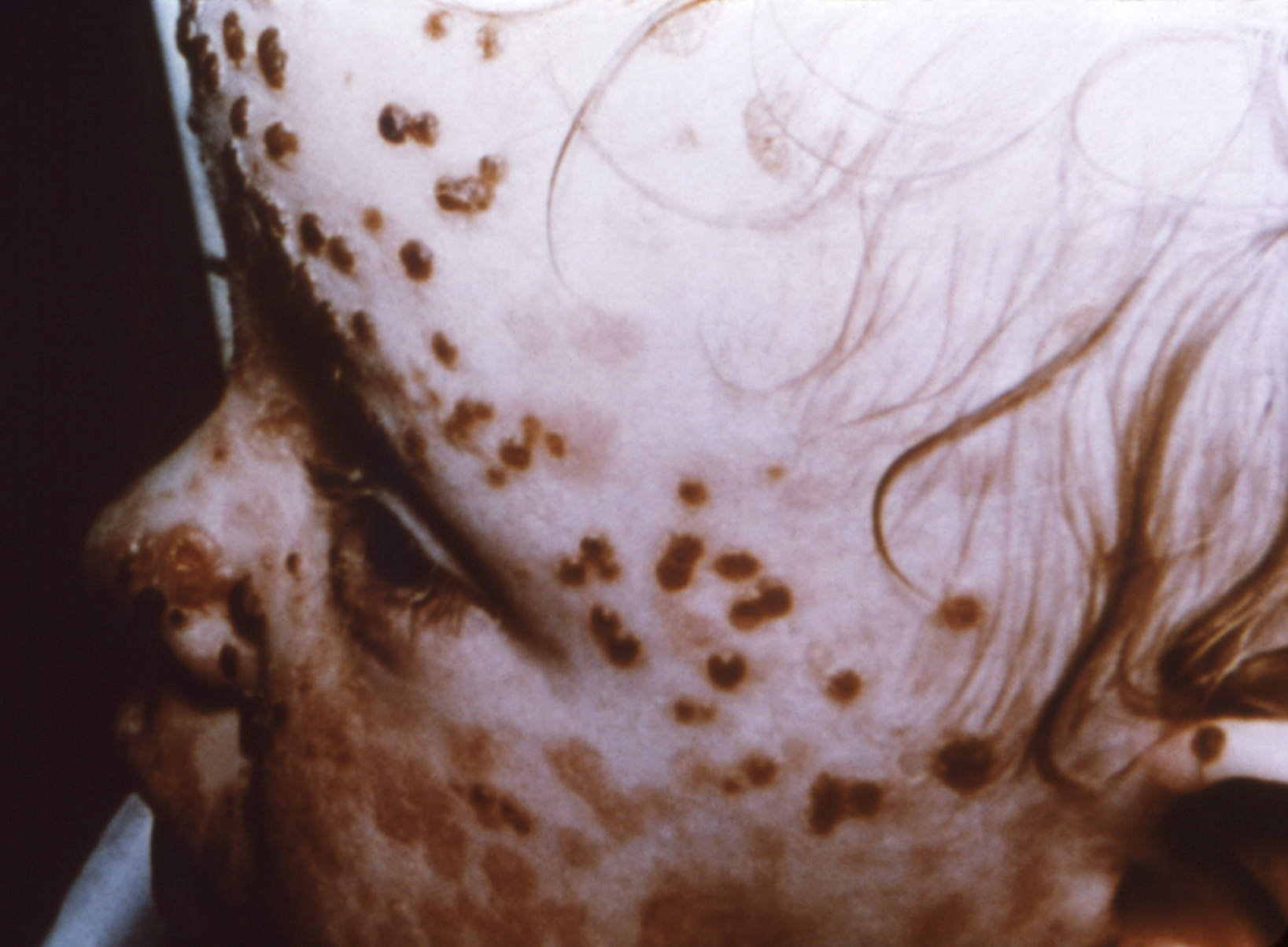
Modified smallpox in a 4-year-old child in Cardiff, Wales, 1962

Referring to the character of the eruption and the rapidity of its development, modified smallpox occurred mostly in previously vaccinated people. It was rare in unvaccinated people, with one case study showing 1–2% of modified cases compared to around 25% in vaccinated people. In this form, the prodromal illness still occurred but may have been less severe than in the ordinary type. There was usually no fever during the evolution of the rash. The skin lesions tended to be fewer and evolved more quickly, were more superficial, and may not have shown the uniform characteristic of more typical smallpox. Modified smallpox was rarely, if ever, fatal. This form of variola major was more easily confused with chickenpox.

=== Malignant ===
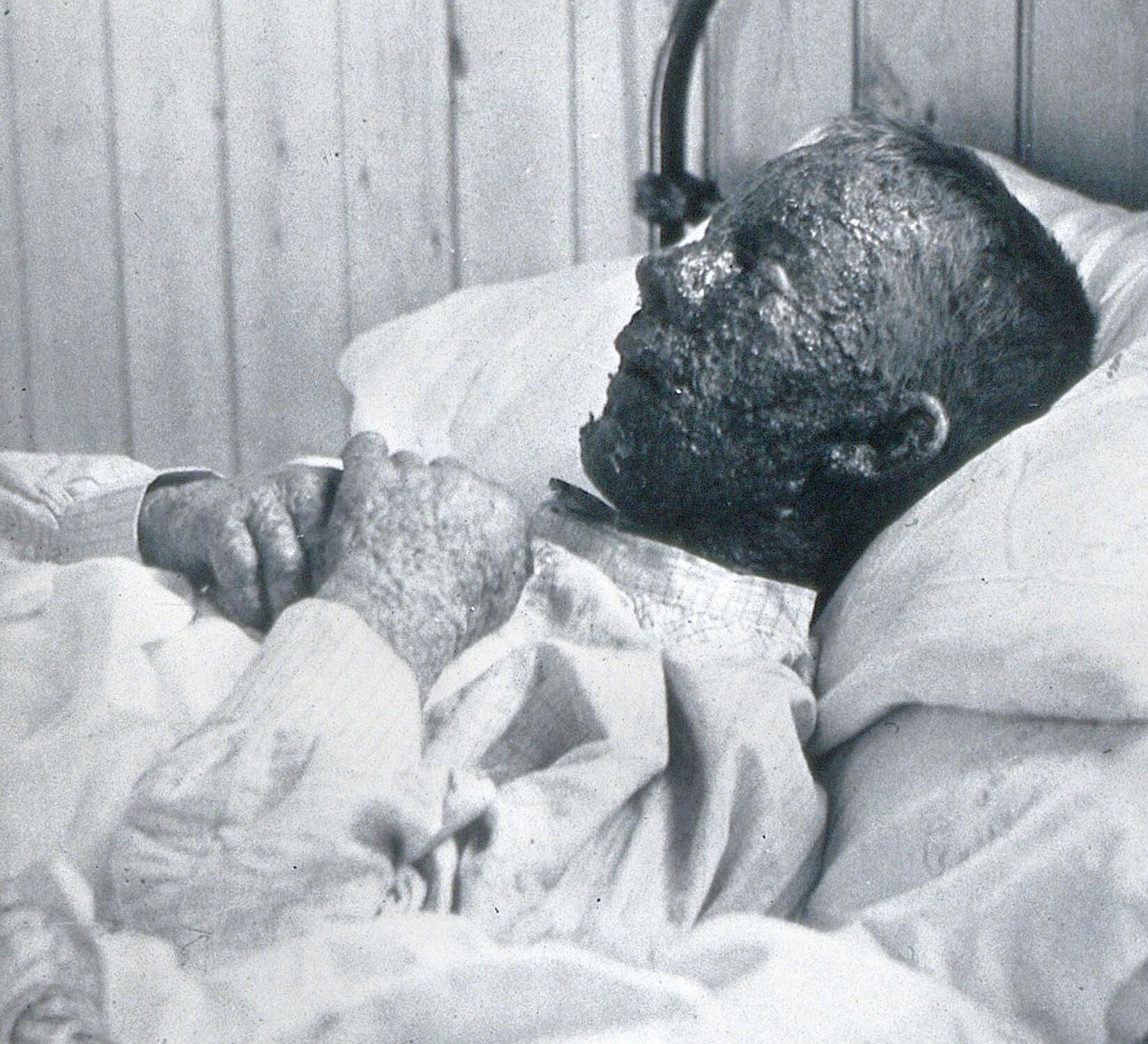
Malignant hemorrhagic smallpox in a baker during an 1896 epidemic in Gloucester, England. Died 8 days after admission.

In malignant-type smallpox (also called flat smallpox) the lesions remained almost flush with the skin at the time when raised vesicles would have formed in the ordinary type. It is unknown why some people developed this type. Historically, it accounted for 5–10% of cases, and most (72%) were children. Malignant smallpox was accompanied by a severe prodromal phase that lasted 3–4 days, prolonged high fever, and severe symptoms of viremia. The prodromal symptoms continued even after the onset of the rash. The rash on the mucous membranes (enanthem) was extensive. Skin lesions matured slowly, were typically confluent or semi-confluent, and by the seventh or eighth day, they were flat and appeared to be buried in the skin. Unlike ordinary-type smallpox, the vesicles contained little fluid, were soft and velvety to the touch, and may have contained hemorrhages. Malignant smallpox was nearly always fatal and death usually occurred between the 8th and 12th day of illness. Often, a day or two before death, the lesions turned ashen gray, which, along with abdominal distension, was a bad prognostic sign. This form is thought to be caused by deficient cell-mediated immunity to smallpox. If the person recovered, the lesions gradually faded and did not form scars or scabs.

=== Hemorrhagic ===
Hemorrhagic smallpox is a severe form accompanied by extensive bleeding into the skin, mucous membranes, gastrointestinal tract, and viscera. This form develops in approximately 2% of infections and occurs mostly in adults. Pustules do not typically form in hemorrhagic smallpox. Instead, bleeding occurs under the skin, making it look charred and black, hence this form of the disease is also referred to as variola nigra or "black pox". Hemorrhagic smallpox has very rarely been caused by variola minor virus. While bleeding may occur in mild cases and not affect outcomes, hemorrhagic smallpox is typically fatal. Vaccination does not appear to provide any immunity to either form of hemorrhagic smallpox and some cases even occurred among people that were revaccinated shortly before. It has two forms.

=== Early ===
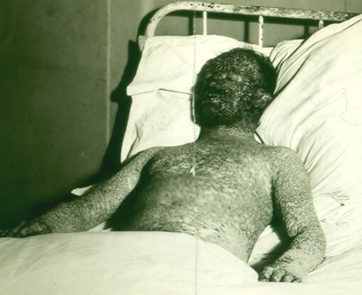
An unvaccinated person with probable hemorrhagic smallpox in a 1925 Milwaukee, Wisconsin, epidemic. He later died of the disease.

The early or fulminant form of hemorrhagic smallpox (referred to as purpura variolosa) begins with a prodromal phase characterized by a high fever, severe headache, and abdominal pain. The skin becomes dusky and erythematous, and this is rapidly followed by the development of petechiae and bleeding in the skin, conjunctiva and mucous membranes. Death often occurs suddenly between the fifth and seventh days of illness, when only a few insignificant skin lesions are present. Some people survive a few days longer, during which time the skin detaches and fluid accumulates under it, rupturing at the slightest injury. People are usually conscious until death or shortly before. Autopsy reveals petechiae and bleeding in the spleen, kidney, serous membranes, skeletal muscles, pericardium, liver, gonads and bladder. Historically, this condition was frequently misdiagnosed, with the correct diagnosis made only at autopsy. This form is more likely to occur in pregnant women than in the general population (approximately 16% of cases in unvaccinated pregnant women were early hemorrhagic smallpox, versus roughly 1% in nonpregnant women and adult males). The case fatality rate of early hemorrhagic smallpox approaches 100%.

=== Late ===
There is also a later form of hemorrhagic smallpox (referred to late hemorrhagic smallpox, or variolosa pustula hemorrhagica). The prodrome is severe and similar to that observed in early hemorrhagic smallpox, and the fever persists throughout the course of the disease. Bleeding appears in the early eruptive period (but later than that seen in purpura variolosa), and the rash is often flat and does not progress beyond the vesicular stage. Hemorrhages in the mucous membranes appear to occur less often than in the early hemorrhagic form. Sometimes the rash forms pustules which bleed at the base and then undergo the same process as in ordinary smallpox. This form of the disease is characterized by a decrease in all of the elements of the coagulation cascade and an increase in circulating antithrombin. This form of smallpox occurs anywhere from 3% to 25% of fatal cases, depending on the virulence of the smallpox strain. Most people with the late-stage form die within eight to 10 days of illness. Among the few who recover, the hemorrhagic lesions gradually disappear after a long period of convalescence. The case fatality rate for late hemorrhagic smallpox is around 90–95%. Pregnant women are slightly more likely to experience this form of the disease, though not as much as early hemorrhagic smallpox.

Case fatality rate and frequency of smallpox by type and vaccination status according to Rao case study
Type of disease	Case fatality rate (%)		Frequency (%)	
Type of disease	Unvac.	Vac.	Unvac.	Vac.
Ordinary discrete	9.3	0.7	42.1	58.4
Ordinary confluent	62	26.3	22.8	4.6
Ordinary semiconfluent	37	8.4	23.9	7
Modified	0	0	2.1	25.3
Malignant aka Flat	96.5	66.7	6.7	1.3
Early hemorrhagic	100	100	0.7	1.4
Late hemorrhagic	96.8	89.8	1.7	2.0

== Signs and symptoms ==
Smallpox (US Army, 1967)

The initial symptoms were similar to other viral diseases that are still extant, such as influenza and the common cold: fever of at least 38.3 °C (101 °F), muscle pain, malaise, headache and fatigue. As the digestive tract was commonly involved, nausea, vomiting, and backache often occurred. The early prodromal stage usually lasted 2–4 days. By days 12–15, the first visible lesions – small reddish spots called enanthem – appeared on mucous membranes of the mouth, tongue, palate, and throat, and the temperature fell to near-normal. These lesions rapidly enlarged and ruptured, releasing large amounts of virus into the saliva.

The variola virus tended to attack skin cells, causing the characteristic pimples, or macules, associated with the disease. A rash developed on the skin 24 to 48 hours after lesions on the mucous membranes appeared. Typically, the macules first appeared on the forehead, then rapidly spread to the whole face, proximal portions of extremities, the trunk, and lastly to the distal portions of extremities. The process took no more than 24 to 36 hours, after which no new lesions appeared. At this point, variola major disease could take several different courses, which resulted in four types of smallpox disease based on the Rao classification: ordinary, modified, malignant (or flat), and hemorrhagic. Historically, ordinary smallpox had an overall fatality rate of about 30%, while the malignant and hemorrhagic forms were usually fatal. The modified form was almost never fatal. In early hemorrhagic cases, hemorrhages occurred before any skin lesions developed. The incubation period between contraction and the first obvious symptoms of the disease was typically 7–14 days.

== Cause ==
Smallpox is caused by infection with the variola virus, which belongs to the family Poxviridae, subfamily Chordopoxvirinae, genus Orthopoxvirus.

=== Evolution ===
The date of the appearance of smallpox is not settled. It is probable that it evolved from a terrestrial African rodent virus between 68,000 and 16,000 years ago. The wide range of dates is due to the different records used to calibrate the molecular clock. One clade included the variola major strains (the more clinically severe form of smallpox), which spread from Asia between 400 and 1,600 years ago. A second clade included both alastrim (a phenotypically mild smallpox) described from the American continents and isolates from West Africa which diverged from an ancestral strain between 1,400 and 6,300 years before present. This clade further diverged into two subclades at least 800 years ago.

A second estimate has placed the separation of the variola virus from Taterapox (an Orthopoxvirus of some African rodents, including gerbils) at 3,000 to 4,000 years ago. This is consistent with archaeological and historical evidence regarding the appearance of smallpox as a human disease which suggests a relatively recent origin. If the mutation rate is assumed to be similar to that of the herpesviruses, the divergence date of the variola virus from Taterapox has been estimated to be 50,000 years ago. A strain that dates from c. 1650 has been shown to be basal to the other presently sequenced strains.

=== Virology ===
The variola virus is large and brick-shaped and is approximately 330 nanometers by 260 nm, with a single linear double stranded DNA genome 186 kilobase pairs (kbp) in size and containing a hairpin loop at each end. It infects only humans in nature. Both enveloped and unenveloped virions are infectious. Infection with either the major or minor strain confers immunity against the other. Variola major, the more common of the two strains, caused the more clinically severe illness and accounted for the great majority of smallpox's historical mortality. The genome of variola major virus is about 186,000 base pairs in length. It is made from linear double stranded DNA and contains the coding sequence for about 200 genes. The center of the genome contains the majority of the essential viral genes, including for structural proteins, DNA replication, transcription, and mRNA synthesis. The ends of the genome vary more across strains and species of orthopoxviruses. These regions contain proteins that modulate the hosts' immune systems, and are primarily responsible for the variability in virulence across the orthopoxvirus family. Gene expression occurs entirely within the cytoplasm of the host cell, and follows a distinct progression during infection. About half of the viral genome is transcribed prior to the replication of viral DNA. The first set of expressed genes are transcribed by pre-existing viral machinery packaged within the infecting virion. These genes encode the factors necessary for viral DNA synthesis and for transcription of the next set of expressed genes. DNA replication in variola virus takes place within the cytoplasm of the infected cell. Recombination of the genome occurs within actively infected cells. The products include transcription factors for transcribing genes for new virions, as well as viral RNA polymerase and other essential enzymes for new viral particles. These proteins are packaged into new infectious virions.

=== Research ===
Two live samples of the variola major virus remain, one in the United States at the CDC in Atlanta, and one at the Vector Institute in Koltsovo, Russia. Research with the remaining virus samples is tightly controlled, and each research proposal must be approved by both the WHO and the World Health Assembly (WHA). Most research on poxviruses is performed using the closely related Vaccinia virus as a model organism. Vaccinia virus, which is used to vaccinate for smallpox, is also under research as a viral vector for vaccines for unrelated diseases.

The genome of the variola major virus was first sequenced in its entirety in the 1990s. The complete coding sequence is publicly available online. The current reference sequence for variola major was sequenced from a strain that circulated in India in 1967. In addition, there are sequences for samples of other strains that were collected during the WHO eradication campaign. A genome browser for a complete database of annotated sequences of variola and other poxviruses is publicly available through the Viral Bioinformatics Resource Center.

==== Genetic engineering ====
The WHO currently bans genetic engineering of the variola virus. However, in 2004, a committee advisory to the WHO voted in favor of allowing editing of the genome of the two remaining samples of variola major to add a marker gene. This gene, called GFP, or green fluorescent protein, would cause live samples of the virus to glow green under fluorescent light. The insertion of this gene, which would not influence the virulence of the virus, would be the only allowed modification of the genome. The committee stated the proposed modification would aid in research of treatments by making it easier to assess whether a potential treatment was effective in killing viral samples. The recommendation could only take effect if approved by the WHA. When the WHA discussed the proposal in 2005, it refrained from taking a formal vote on the proposal, stating that it would review individual research proposals one at a time. Addition of the GFP gene to the Vaccinia genome is routinely performed during research on the closely related vaccinia virus.

==== Controversies ====
The public availability of variola's complete sequence has raised concerns about the possibility of illicit synthesis of the infectious virus. Vaccinia, a cousin of the variola virus, was artificially synthesized in 2002 by NIH scientists. They used a previously established method that involved using a recombinant viral genome to create a self-replicating bacterial plasmid that produced viral particles.

In 2016, another group synthesized the horsepox virus using publicly available sequence data for horsepox. The researchers argued that their work would be beneficial to creating a safer and more effective vaccine for smallpox, although an effective vaccine is already available. The horsepox virus had previously seemed to have gone extinct, raising concerns about a potential revival of variola major, causing other scientists to question their motives. Critics found it especially concerning that the group was able to recreate a viable virus in a short time frame with relatively little cost or effort. Although the WHO bans individual laboratories from synthesizing more than 20% of the genome at a time, and purchases of smallpox genome fragments are monitored and regulated, a group with malicious intentions could compile, from multiple sources, the full synthetic genome necessary to produce a viable virus.

=== Transmission ===
Smallpox was highly contagious, but it generally spread more slowly and less widely than some other viral diseases, most likely due to transmission requiring close contact and occurring after rash onset. The overall rate of infection was also affected by the short duration of the infectious stage. In temperate areas, the number of smallpox infections was highest during the winter and spring. In tropical areas, seasonal variation was less evident and the disease was present throughout the year. Age distribution of smallpox infections depended on acquired immunity. Vaccination immunity declined over time and was probably lost within thirty years. Smallpox was not known to be transmitted by insects or animals and there was no asymptomatic carrier state. Transmission occurred through the inhalation of airborne variola virions, usually droplets expressed from the oral, nasal, or pharyngeal mucosa of an infected person. It was transmitted from one person to another primarily through prolonged face-to-face contact with an infected person.

Some infections of laundry workers with smallpox after handling contaminated bedding suggested that smallpox could be spread through direct contact with contaminated objects (fomites), but this was found to be rare. Additionally, smallpox was rarely spread in the air of enclosed settings such as buildings, buses, and trains. The virus can cross the placenta, but the incidence of congenital smallpox was relatively low. Smallpox was not notably infectious in the prodromal period, and viral shedding was usually delayed until the appearance of the rash, which was often accompanied by lesions in the mouth and pharynx. The virus can be transmitted throughout the course of the illness, but this happened most frequently during the first week of the rash when most of the skin lesions were intact. Infectivity waned in 7 to 10 days when scabs formed over the lesions, but the infected person was considered to still be contagious until the last smallpox scab fell off.

Concerns about the possible use of smallpox for biological warfare led to Donald K. Milton's detailed review in 2002 of existing research on its transmission and of then-current recommendations for controlling its spread. He agreed (citing Rao, Fenner and others) that "careful epidemiologic investigation rarely implicated fomites as a source of infection"; noted that "Current recommendations for control of secondary smallpox infections emphasize transmission 'by expelled droplets to close contacts (those within 6–7 feet)'"; but warned that the "emphasis on spread via large droplets may reduce the vigilance with which more difficult airborne precautions [i.e. against finer droplets capable of traveling longer distances and penetrating deeply into the lower respiratory tract] are maintained".

=== Mechanism ===
Once inhaled, the variola virus would invade the mucous membranes of the mouth, throat, and respiratory tract. From there, it would then migrate to the regional lymph nodes and begin to multiply. In the initial growth phase, the virus appeared to move from cell to cell, but by around the 12th day, widespread lysis of infected cells would occurr and the virus could be found in the bloodstream in large numbers, a condition known as viremia. This often resulted in the second wave of multiplication in the spleen, bone marrow, and lymph nodes.

== Diagnosis ==
The clinical definition of ordinary smallpox is that of an illness with an acute onset of fever, followed by a rash characterized by firm, deep-seated vesicles or pustules in the same stage of development without any other apparent cause. Before the availability of laboratory testing, doctors could diagnose smallpox by touch alone, due to the distinctively hard pustules.

Microscopically, poxviruses produce characteristic cytoplasmic inclusion bodies, the most important of which are known as Guarnieri bodies, and are the sites of viral replication. Guarnieri bodies are readily identified in skin biopsies stained with hematoxylin and eosin, and appear as pink blobs. They are found in virtually all poxvirus infections, but the absence of Guarnieri bodies could not be used to rule out smallpox. The diagnosis of an orthopox virus infection can also be made rapidly by electron microscopic examination of pustular fluid or scabs. All orthopox viruses exhibit identical brick-shaped virions by electron microscopy.

Definitive laboratory identification of variola involved growing the virus on chorioallantoic membrane (part of a chicken embryo) and examining the resulting pock lesions under defined temperature conditions. Strains were characterized by polymerase chain reaction (PCR) and restriction fragment length polymorphism (RFLP) analysis. Serologic tests and enzyme linked immunosorbent assays (ELISA), which measured variola-specific immunoglobulin and antigen were also developed to assist in the diagnosis of infection.

Chickenpox was commonly confused with smallpox in the immediate post-eradication era. Chickenpox and smallpox could be distinguished by several methods. First, unlike smallpox, chickenpox does not usually affect the palms and soles. Additionally, chickenpox pustules tend to vary in size due to variable timings in pustule eruption, while smallpox pustules were nearly the same size due to a more uniform viral progress. A variety of laboratory methods were available for detecting chickenpox in the evaluation of suspected smallpox cases.

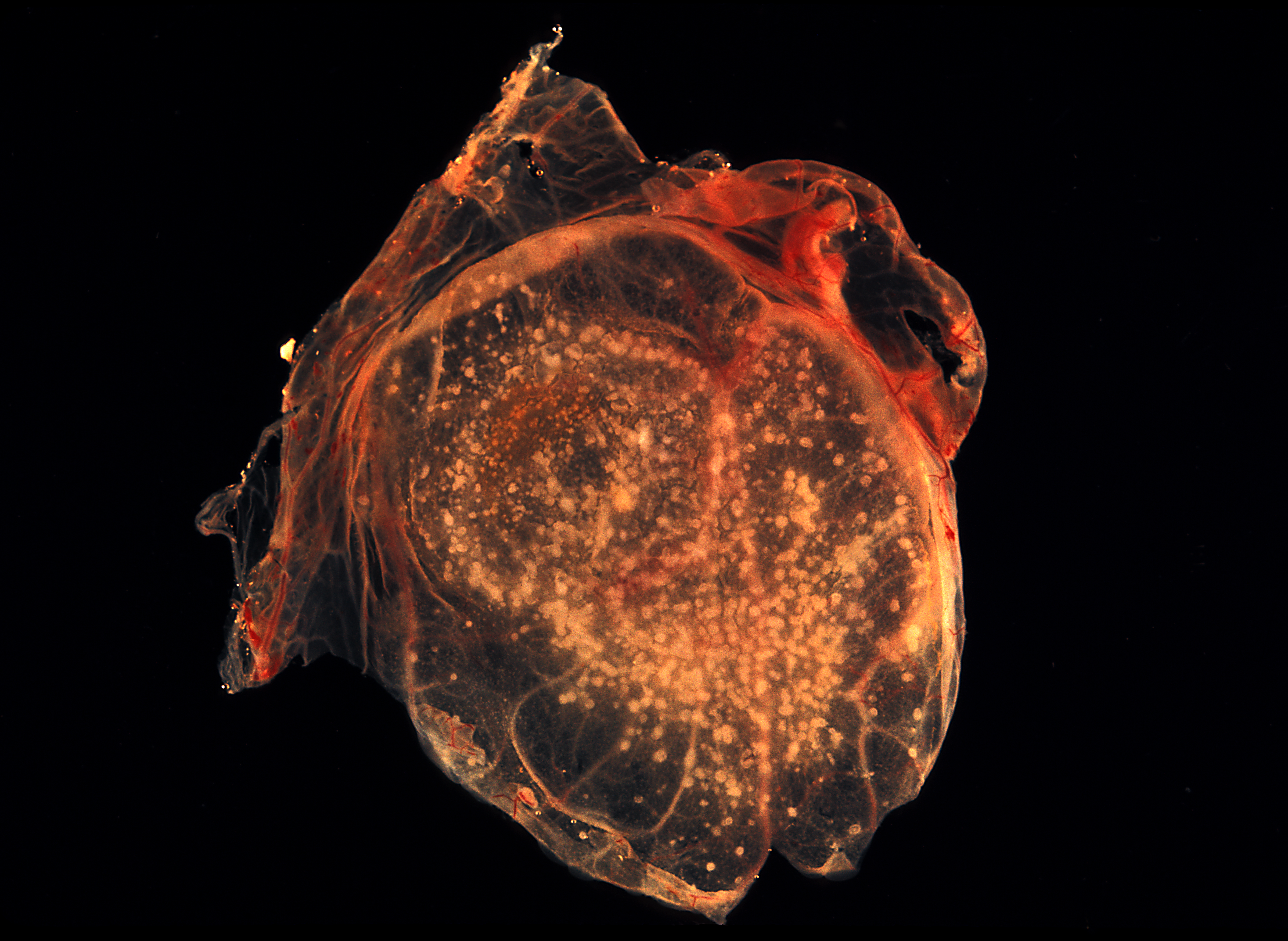
Smallpox virus lesions on the chorioallantoic membrane of a developing chick

In contrast to the rash in smallpox, the rash in chickenpox occurs mostly on the torso, spreading less to the limbs.

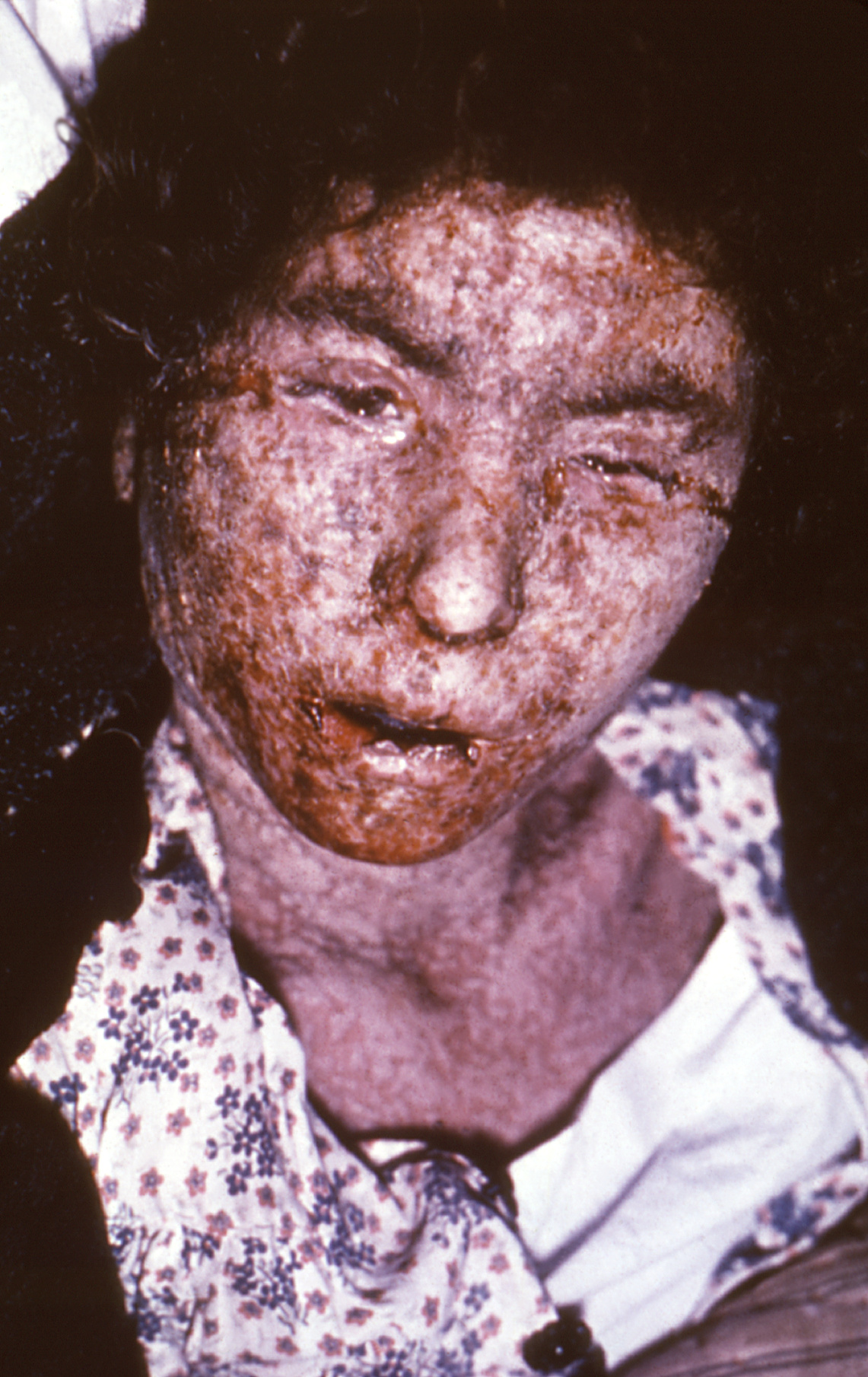
An Italian female smallpox patient whose skin displayed the characteristics of late-stage confluent maculopapular scarring, 1965

== Prevention ==
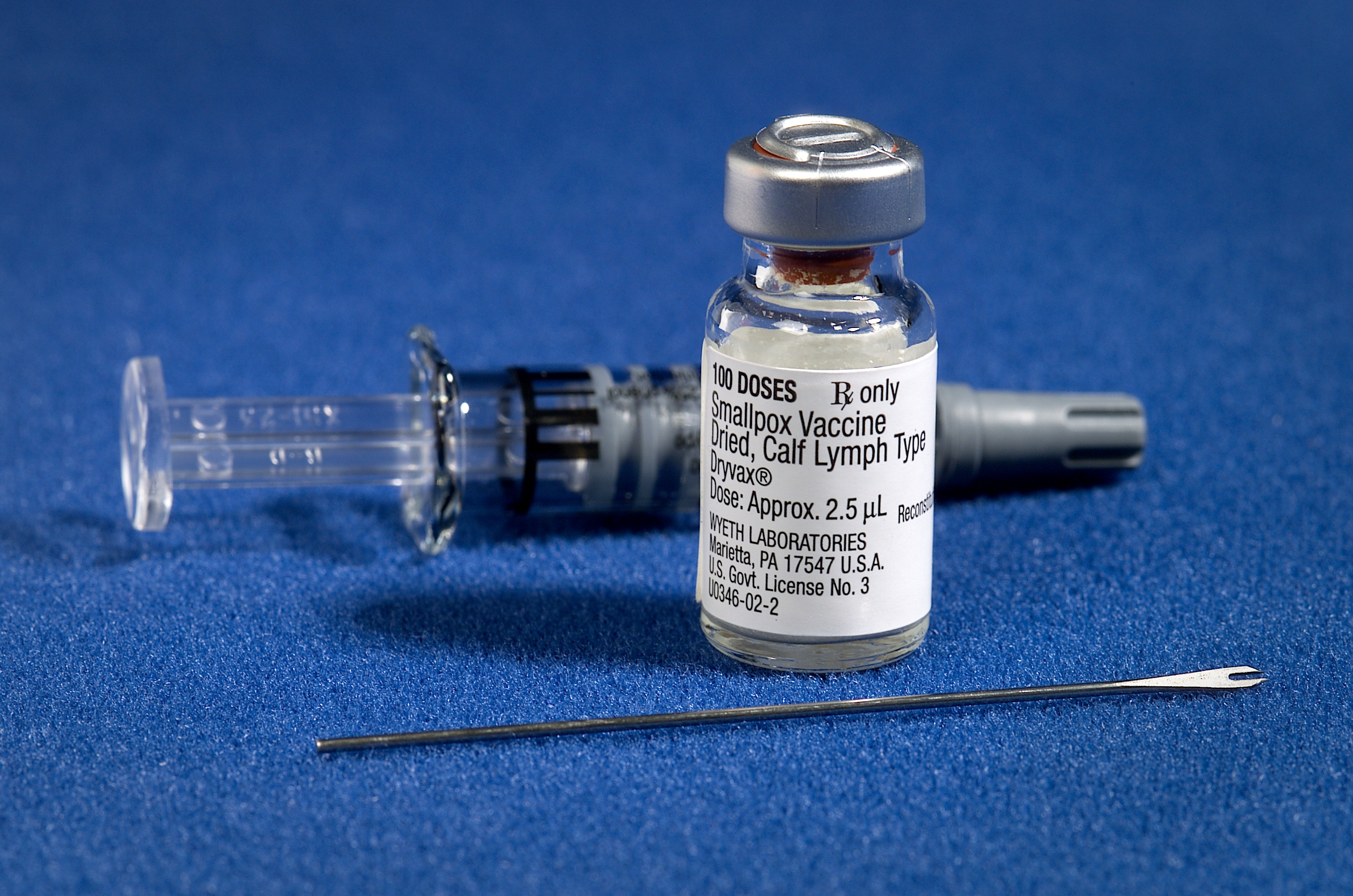
A modern smallpox vaccine

The smallpox vaccine is used to prevent smallpox infection caused by the variola virus. It is the first vaccine to have been developed against a contagious disease. In 1796, British physician Edward Jenner demonstrated that an infection with the relatively mild cowpox virus conferred immunity against the deadly smallpox disease. Cowpox served as a natural vaccine until the modern smallpox vaccine emerged in the 20th century. From 1958 to 1977, the World Health Organization (WHO) conducted a global vaccination campaign that eradicated smallpox, making it the only human disease to be eradicated. Although routine smallpox vaccination is no longer performed on the general public, the vaccine is still being produced for research, and to guard against bioterrorism and biological warfare.

The term vaccine derives from vacca, the Latin word for cow, reflecting the origins of smallpox vaccination. Edward Jenner referred to cowpox as variolae vaccinae (smallpox of the cow). The origins of the smallpox vaccine became murky over time, especially after Louis Pasteur developed laboratory techniques for creating vaccines in the 19th century. Allan Watt Downie demonstrated in 1939 that the modern smallpox vaccine was serologically distinct from cowpox, and vaccinia was subsequently recognized as a separate viral species. Whole-genome sequencing has revealed that vaccinia is most closely related to horsepox, and the cowpox strains found in Great Britain are the least closely related to vaccinia.

The smallpox vaccine has also proven useful in preventing emergent infectious diseases caused by closely-related orthopoxviruses such as Mpox. Three specific smallpox vaccines have been approved in at least one country for Mpox prevention: MVA-BN, LC16m8, and ACAM2000. The Mpox vaccine is on the World Health Organization's List of Essential Medicines.

== Treatment ==
Smallpox vaccination within three days of exposure prevented or significantly lessened the severity of smallpox symptoms in the majority of people. Vaccination four to seven days after exposure can offer some protection from, or modify the severity, of the disease. Other than vaccination, treatment of smallpox was primarily supportive, which included wound care, infection control, fluid therapy, and possible ventilator assistance. Flat and hemorrhagic types of smallpox were treated with the same therapies used to treat shock, such as fluid resuscitation. People with semi-confluent and confluent types of smallpox may have had therapeutic issues similar to patients with extensive skin burns.

Antiviral treatments have improved since the last large smallpox epidemics, and as of 2004, studies suggest that the antiviral drug cidofovir might be useful as a therapeutic agent. The drug must be administered intravenously, and may cause serious kidney toxicity. In July 2018, the Food and Drug Administration approved tecovirimat, the first drug to be approved for treatment of smallpox. However, during treatment, viral mutations causing resistance have been known to occur, especially in its use for the 2022–2023 mpox outbreak, which potentially jeopardizes its effectiveness for smallpox biothreat preparedness.

In June 2021, Brincidofovir was approved for medical use in the United States for the treatment of human smallpox disease caused by the variola virus.

== Prognosis ==
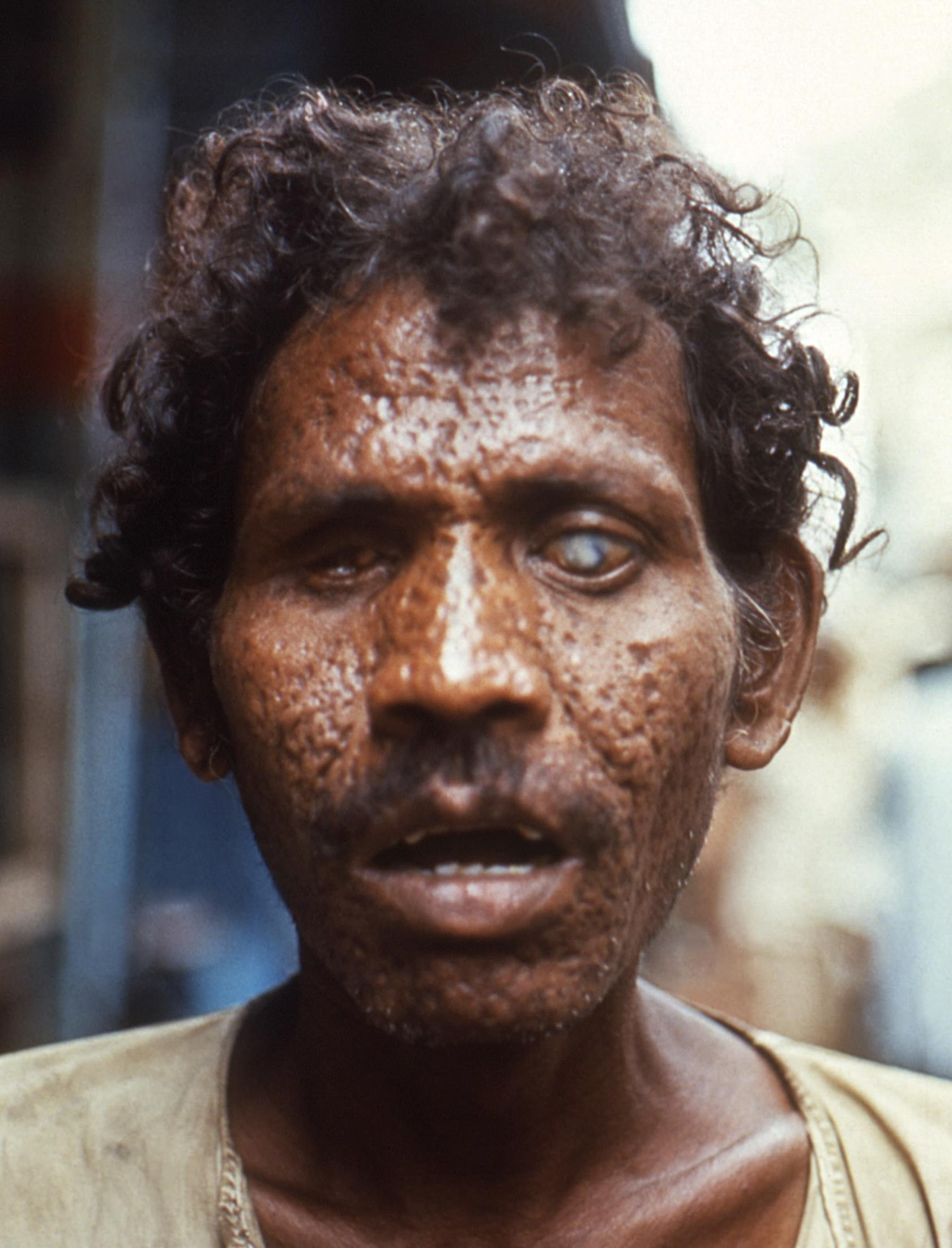
Smallpox survivor with facial scarring, blindness and white corneal scar in his left eye, 1972

Historically, the mortality rate from variola minor was approximately 1%, while the mortality rate from variola major was approximately 30%.

Ordinary type-confluent was fatal about 50–75% of the time, while ordinary-type semi-confluent was fatal about 25–50% of the time-in cases where the rash is discrete, the case-fatality rate is less than 10%. The overall fatality rate for children younger than 1 year of age was 40–50%. Hemorrhagic and flat types had the highest fatality rates reaching 90% or greater, with nearly 100% of cases being fatal in cases of early hemorrhagic smallpox. In contrast, the case-fatality rate for variola minor was 1% or less. There has been no evidence of chronic or recurrent infection with the variola virus. In cases of flat smallpox in vaccinated people, the condition was extremely rare but less lethal, with one case series showing a 67% death rate.

In fatal cases of ordinary smallpox, death usually occurred between days 10–16 of the illness. The cause of death from smallpox was not clear, but the infection is now known to involve multiple organs. Circulating immune complexes, overwhelming viremia, or an uncontrolled immune response may be contributing factors. In early hemorrhagic smallpox, death occurred suddenly about six days after the fever developed. The cause of death in early hemorrhagic cases was commonly due to heart failure and pulmonary edema. In late hemorrhagic cases, high and sustained viremia, severe platelet loss and poor immune response were often cited as causes of death. In flat smallpox, modes of death were similar to those in burns, including a loss of fluid, protein and electrolytes, and fulminating sepsis.

=== Complications ===
Complications of smallpox arose most commonly in the respiratory system, and ranged from simple bronchitis to fatal pneumonia. Respiratory complications tended to develop around the eighth day of the illness, which was either viral or bacterial in origin. Secondary bacterial infection of the skin was a relatively uncommon complication of smallpox. When this occurred, the fever typically remained elevated.

Other complications included encephalitis (1 in 500 patients), which was more common in adults and may have caused temporary disability; permanent pitted scars, most notably on the face; and complications involving the eyes (2% of all cases). Pustules can form on the eyelid, conjunctiva, and cornea, leading to complications such as conjunctivitis, keratitis, corneal ulcer, iritis, iridocyclitis, and atrophy of the optic nerve. Blindness resulted in approximately 35–40% of eyes affected with keratitis and corneal ulcer. Hemorrhagic smallpox had also caused subconjunctival and retinal hemorrhages. In 2–5% of young children with smallpox, virions reached the joints and bone, causing osteomyelitis variolosa. Bony lesions were symmetrical, most common in the elbows, legs, and characteristically caused the separation of the epiphysis and marked periosteal reactions. Swollen joints limited movement, and arthritis may have led to limb deformities, ankylosis, malformed bones, flail joints, and stubby fingers.

Between 65 and 80% of survivors conserve indelible white scars.

== History ==
The history of smallpox extends into pre-history. Genetic evidence suggests that the smallpox virus emerged 3,000 to 4,000 years ago. Prior to that, similar ancestral viruses circulated, but possibly only in other mammals, and possibly with different symptoms. Only a few written reports dating from about 500–1000 CE are considered reliable historical descriptions of smallpox, so understanding of the disease prior to that has relied on genetics and archaeology. However, during the second millennium, especially starting in the 16th century, reliable written reports become more common. The earliest physical evidence of smallpox is found in the Egyptian mummies of people who died some 3,000 years ago. Smallpox has had a major impact on world history, not least because indigenous populations of regions where smallpox was non-native, such as the Americas and Australia, were rapidly and greatly reduced by smallpox (along with other introduced diseases) during periods of initial foreign contact, which helped pave the way for conquest and colonization. During the 18th century, the disease killed an estimated 400,000 Europeans each year, including five reigning monarchs, and was responsible for a third of all blindness. Between 20 and 60% of all those infected—and over 80% of infected children—died from the disease.

During the 20th century, it is estimated that smallpox was responsible for 250–500 million deaths. In the early 1950s, an estimated 50 million cases of smallpox occurred in the world each year. As recently as 1967, the World Health Organization estimated that 15 million people contracted the disease and that two million died in that year. After successful vaccination campaigns throughout the 19th and 20th centuries, the WHO certified the global eradication of smallpox in May 1980. Smallpox is one of two infectious diseases to have been eradicated, the other being rinderpest, which was declared eradicated in 2011. The final known fatal case occurred in 1978 in a laboratory in Birmingham, England.

== Society and culture ==
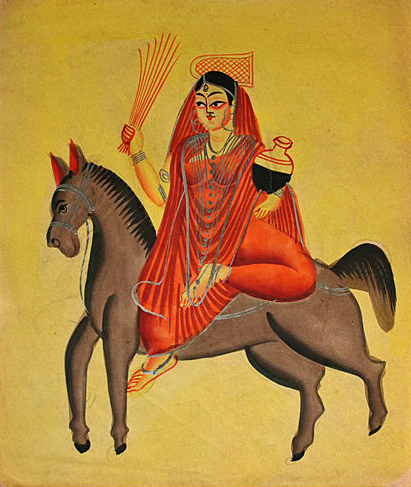
The Hindu goddess Shitala was worshipped to prevent or cure smallpox.

As a dangerous viral disease that caused deaths around the world, smallpox had numerous effects on human societies and cultures. It may have been used as a form of biological warfare during the colonial era, and a smallpox weapons factory was established by the Soviet Union in 1947. The disease affected many famous historical figures, from the ruler of ancient Egypt Ramses V to the Austrian composer Wolfgang Amadeus Mozart and the American president George Washington. Smallpox gods and goddesses have been worshipped in regions - including China and India - in the hope of warding off or curing the disease.

== See also ==
- Jacobson v. Massachusetts
- List of epidemics
- List of epidemics and pandemics § Chronology
- Population history of indigenous peoples of the Americas § Depopulation by Old World diseases
