= Downie bodies =

Histological finding in cowpox

Downie bodies, also known as a type of A-type inclusion, are a type of inclusion body (protein aggregates) associated with cowpox. They are named for Allan Watt Downie.

A Downie body is different from a Downey cell which is a reactive lymphocyte. They are named for Hal Downey.
