= Aldo Ferraresi =

Italian concert violinist (1902 - 1978)

- Born: 14 May 1902; Ferrara, Italy
- Died: 29 June 1978 (aged 76) Sanremo, Italy
- Genre: Classical
- Occupations: violinist, pedagogue
- Instruments: Camillo Camilli; Alessandro Gagliano
- Years active: 1923–1977

Aldo Ferraresi (14 May 1902 – 9 June 1978) was an Italian concert violinist and violin pedagogue.

== Life and career ==
Ferraresi was born in Ferrara, the son of Augusto Ferraresi (1868–1939), an artillery marshal and mandolin player, and Marcella Jesi. His mother was of Jewish origin. At the age of five he began his studies at the Frescobaldi Institute of Music in Ferrara with Federico Barera and Umberto Supino. When he was 12, he was admitted to the Parma Conservatory. His teacher there, Mario Corti, also accompanied him to Rome where he received a degree in violin from the Accademia di Santa Cecilia three years later. Upon suggestions from Jan Kubelik, he went to Eugène Ysaÿe, who considered him one of his best pupils. Starting from 1923 he was leader of "Aldo Ferraresi Chamber Orchestra" where, together with Marcello Cortopassi and professors of the "Rome Augusteo Orchestra", he played at Gran Caffé Margherita in Viareggio (Lucca). He went on to perform in concert halls throughout Europe and the United States including La Scala in Milan, the Royal Festival Hall in London. In addition to his solo concert work, he was also first violin in the Quartet of San Remo and concertmaster at the Symphonic Orchestra of San Remo, as well at the Teatro San Carlo in Naples. As teacher, he held the violin class at Music Conservatory "N.Piccinni" in Bari from October 1967 till 1973, when Nino Rota was the director. Among his pupils we can remember Uto Ughi that studied with him privately in Naples for 7 years. Aldo Ferraresi died in Sanremo on 29 June 1978. In May 2002, the 100th anniversary of his birth was marked by an exhibition and seminars in Ferrara and concerts in his honour in Ferrara at the Teatro Comunale. Ferraresi played on many precious violins, among of them are the "King George" Stradivarius and the "Cannone" Guarneri of Paganini. His favourite instruments were a Camillo Camilli and an Alessandro Gagliano.

== Family ==
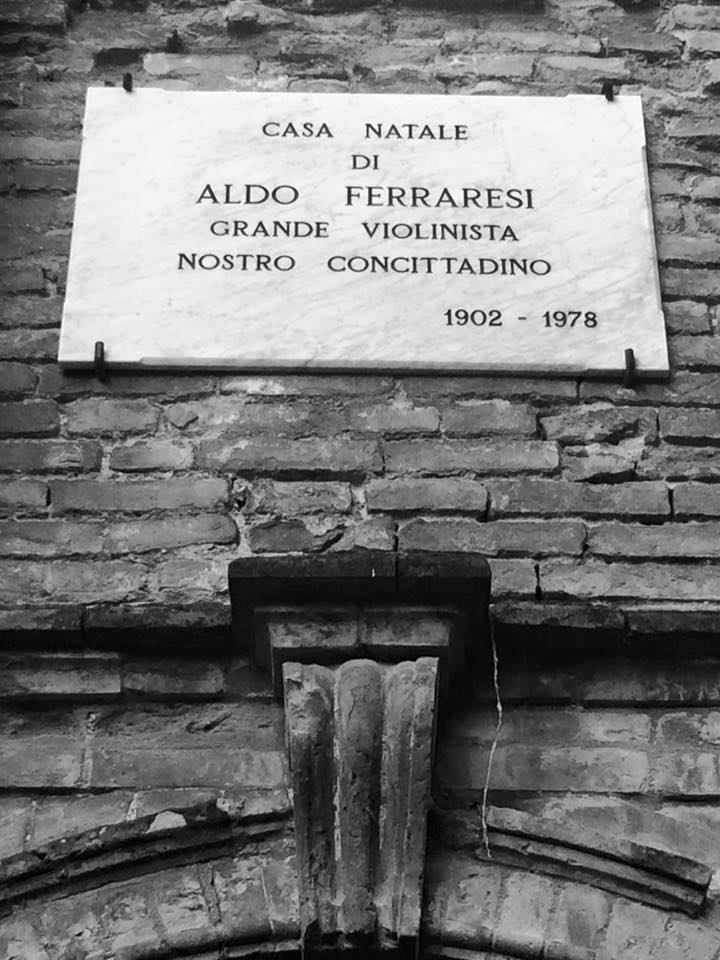
Aldo Ferraresi's native home - Ferrara, Vicolo della gatta marcia n.21

Among the six brothers are Prospero Ferraresi (1908-1972), pianist and his accompanist from the 1920s to the 1940s, Sesto (Sexten) Ferraresi (1915-1984), dealer in musical instruments that lived in Berlin, and the younger, that was also his pupil, Cesare Ferraresi (Ferrara, 12 October 1918 – Milano, 9 January 1981) who was a renowned soloist, concertmaster at RAI Orchestra in Milano and member of "Trio di Milano" (with pianist Bruno Canino and cellist Rocco Filippini). From his marriage with Italia (Ione) Pecori, Aldo Ferraresi had two sons, both musicians, Marcello Ferraresi (San Remo, 20 April 1942 – Naples, 25 December 2006) an appreciated tenor, pupil of Mario del Monaco and the pianist Augusto Ferraresi, that we can see in a RAI video accompanying his father in Paganini recital ("Nel cor più non-mi sento"; "Adagio e Tamburino"; "Le Streghe"; "Sonatina in E minor" (recording: 4 January 1966; broadcast: 28 October 1966 RAI TV1).

== Notable performances ==
″Why do you ask me to play in Italy, when you already have Aldo Ferraresi?″ (David Oistrakh)

- 1950: Genoa, for the 500th anniversary of the birth of Christopher Columbus, he performed Niccolò Paganini Violin Concerto No.1 in D major on Paganini's own violin, the 1742 Guarnieri "Il Cannone".
- 1950: Sanremo, concert in the presence of Prince Philip, Duke of Edinburgh, where, as an encore was demanded by the audience, he performed the Paganini/Wilhelmj Concerto in D major.
- 1955: London, at Royal Festival Hall, he performed William Walton Violin Concerto in B minor under the composer's baton (16 November 1955).
- 1963: Turin, in RAI Auditorium he performed the Aram Kachaturian Violin Concerto in D, conducted by composer himself. Telecast by RAI Italian state television (only audio recording survive).
- 1963: Zurich, he performed the Beethoven Violin Concerto Op.61 -his only survived recording of this piece- (20 May 1963).
- 1965: Vatican, he gave a concert at Auditorium Pio di Via della Conciliazione, in the presence of Pope Paul VI and his Papal Court, playing Jean Sibelius 2 Serious Melodies Op.77. Telecast by RAI Italian state television TV1 (12 June 1965).
- 1971: Nice, he performed Alfredo D'Ambrosio Violin Concerto No.1 in B minor, to commemorate the 100th anniversary of the composer.

== Recordings ==
INSPIRED BY PAGANINI
«In 1950, during the fifth birth centenary of Cristoforo Colombo, the community of Genova selected me among the numerous Italian violinists to perform during the celebrations to jointly commemorate also their great citizen Niccolò Paganini. On that occasion at Palazzo Ducale in Genova, I played Paganini Concerto in D major with the Guarnieri del Gesù, same violin that belonged to Paganini, which he nicknamed "the cannon". Out of my experience, I would say that the spirit of Paganini lingers with a sensible artist. In fact, just a month before the date of my selection, when I was still unaware of the choice, I was feeling uneasy and agitated even though at the time I did not have any reason for concern. During the concert, at Palazzo Ducale, playing the Adagio, I felt like floating in the air. It could be just a mere coincidence or very likely it was the spirit of the great Maestro that did not want to separate from his instrument. This instrument, when you listen to, or hold it, gives always the same emotions, and especially when it has neither audience nor the orchestra, it reopens the dialog with the Genius. In the deep concentration during the performance my hands and mind were in harmony and inspired, being aware that I was rendering the spirit and art of Paganini not mechanically but with my deep soul.» (Aldo Ferraresi, 1963)

- Aldo Ferraresi – il Gigli del violino: The Great Italian Radio Recordings | 9CD box | GLV / RAI Trade ℗ & © 2006 -out of print-
- Aldo Ferraresi – The Gigli of the Violin – Complete recordings 1929-1973 | ‘'The Art of Violin 1 | 18CD box | Rhine Classics RH-001 ℗ & © 2016

== Podcasts ==
- 14/05/2017 | Radio Vaticana | Trasmissione su Wanda Luzzato e Aldo Ferraresi (© 2017 by Keith Goodman)
- 15/06/2017 | Deutschlandfunk | Historische Aufnahmen "Belcanto und virtuoses Feuer | Der Geiger Aldo Ferraresi" (© 2017 by Norbert Hornig)
