= Ostasiatischer Beobachter =

German language monthly magazine

Mitteilungs- und Verordnungsblatt der Landesgruppe Ostasien der NSDAP, issue 7, published on December 1, 1933

Ostasiatischer Beobachter ('East Asian Observer') was a German language monthly magazine published from Shanghai, China from 1933 to the 1940s. It was the official organ of the NSDAP/AO (the Overseas Organization of the National Socialist German Workers Party) in China.

== Early Period ==
On June 8, 1933 the publication began appearing under the title Mitteilungs- und Verordnungsblatt der Landesgruppe Ostasien der NSDAP ('Bulletin and Decree Gazette of the East Asia Country Group of the NSDAP'). It was a four-page hectographic bulletin, printed on poor quality paper in 325 copies. It was the organ of the East Asian Country Group of NSDAP/AO. By the time of its third issue, published on August 15, 1933, the publication was now printed in a professional printing shop. The number of pages was expanded to eight, and it was now printed in 800 copies. As of the fifth issue, published on October 15, 1933, photographs were printed on the cover for the first time (a photo from Germany of convoy of SA men carrying swastika banners). During these initial stages of the publication it was exclusively oriented towards NSDAP party members. Most of the key articles reprinted in the publication were not locally produced in East Asia. By late 1933, the publication had grown to over 30 pages per issue.

== Expansion ==
From its ninth issue, published in February 1934, the publication was renamed as Ostasiatischer Beobachter - a name inspired by the central party organ Völkischer Beobachter. From March 1934 onward the publication was the organ of the China and Japan Country Groups of NSDAP/AO. The publication was now a 35-page monthly magazine, with a claimed circulation of 2,400 copies. Party members were expected to read Ostasiatischer Beobachter and be familiar with contents, per an instruction stated in the opening page of each issue (until the end of 1934). The newspaper carried the subtitle stating that the magazine was to be 'distributed to members and friends of the movement via local branches and support bases'. By this point most readers would be non-party members.

== Finances ==
Subscriptions were cheap, at 0.20 Shilling (later increased to 0.30 Shilling). The cost to produce a professionally printed magazine with multi-coloured covers and photos could not be covered by the subscription payments. Some of the costs were covered by donations and advertisements. But Ostasiatischer Beobachter generally carried less advertisements compared to other Shanghai publications. Advertisers were almost exclusively German companies, including big corporations like Bayer, Siemens, Agfa and Bosch. In the end, most of the finances of the magazine came from subsidies from the NSDAP/AO central organization.

== Mid 1930s ==
From July 1935 onward Ostasiatischer Beobachter was published as the organ of the China Country Group of the NSDAP/AO. Around 1935 Dr. Wilhelm Finkeldey was the editor of Ostasiatischer Beobachter. Finkeldey had become the Director of the Pathological Institute of Tongji University in 1930, and the Warthin–Finkeldey cell would be named after him. The publication now had 40 pages. At the time the publication had a circulation of 3,000 copies. The magazine was distributed in China, Japan, Manchuria, Philippines, Dutch East Indies and Straits Settlements. It was printed at ABC-Press.

== Later period ==
The 1938 Jahrbuch der AO ('Yearbook of AO') highlighted Ostasiatischer Beobachter as one of forty NSDAP/AO organs around the world, affirming that the publication had managed to expand its influence beyond the German expatriate community. As of the late 1930s, NSDAP/AO Country Group Leader Siegfried Lahrmann served as the editor of the publication. By mid-1938 the amount of pages per issue was generally 52, albeit the amount varied. For example, the November 1938 issue had 84 pages. In July 1940 Hans Musshoff became the editor of Ostasiatischer Beobachter. Publishing of Ostasiatischer Beobachter continued until at least 1941, and possibly as late as 1945.
