= Howell-Jolly body-like inclusions =

Howell-Jolly body-like inclusions (HJBLi) are a hematopathological finding of an inclusion arising from detached DNA nuclear fragment in white blood cells caused by dysplastic granulopoiesis. The inclusion is aptly named for its similar appearance of the Howell–Jolly body in erythrocytes. The term was coined in 1989.

They are most often observed in neutrophils, but can also appear in monocytes, lymphocytes, eosinophils.

They may appear in patients on immunosuppression and antiviral therapies with nucleoside analogs, anticancer chemotherapeutic agents, active COVID-19 infections, HIV/AIDS, and myelodysplastic syndrome.
