= Familial encephalopathy with neuroserpin inclusion bodies =

- Specialty: Neurology

Familial encephalopathy with neuroserpin inclusion bodies (FENIB) is a progressive disorder of the nervous system that is characterized by a loss of intellectual functioning (dementia) and seizures. At first, affected individuals may have difficulty sustaining attention and concentrating. Their judgment, insight, and memory become impaired as the condition progresses. Over time, they lose the ability to perform the activities of daily living, and most people with this condition eventually require comprehensive care.

The signs and symptoms of familial encephalopathy with neuroserpin inclusion bodies vary in their severity and age of onset. In severe cases, the condition causes seizures and episodes of sudden, involuntary muscle jerking or twitching (myoclonus) in addition to dementia. These signs can appear as early as a person's teens. Less severe cases are characterized by a progressive decline in intellectual functioning beginning in a person's forties or fifties.

Mutations in the SERPINI1 gene cause familial encephalopathy with neuroserpin inclusion bodies. The SERPINI1 gene provides instructions for making a protein called neuroserpin. This protein is found in nerve cells, where it plays a role in the development and function of the nervous system. Neuroserpin helps control the growth of nerve cells and their connections with one another, which suggests that this protein may be important for learning and memory. Mutations in the gene result in the production of an abnormally shaped, unstable version of neuroserpin. Abnormal neuroserpin proteins can attach to one another and form neuroserpin inclusion bodies or Collins bodies within nerve cells. Collins bodies form in cortical and subcortical neurons where they disrupt the cells' normal functioning and ultimately lead to cell death. Progressive dementia results from this gradual loss of nerve cells in certain parts of the brain. Researchers believe that a buildup of related, potentially toxic substances in nerve cells may also contribute to the signs and symptoms of this condition.

This condition is inherited in an autosomal dominant pattern, which means one copy of the altered gene in each cell is sufficient to cause the disorder. In many cases, an affected person has a parent with the condition.
