= Reactive lymphocyte =

Lymphocytes that become large as a result of antigen stimulation

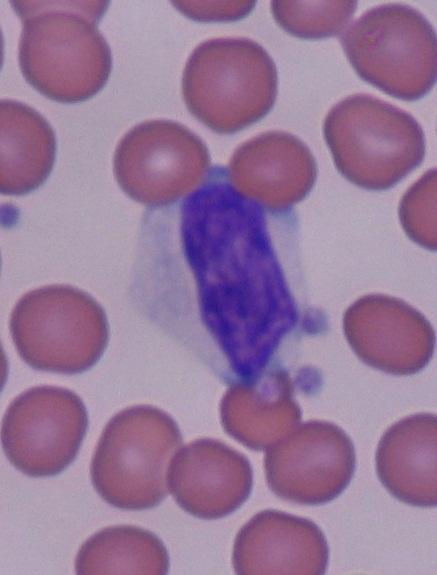
Reactive lymphocyte surrounded by red blood cells

In immunology, reactive lymphocytes, variant lymphocytes, atypical lymphocytes, Downey cells or Türk cells are cytotoxic (CD8^{+}) lymphocytes that become large as a result of antigen stimulation. Typically, they can be more than 30 μm in diameter with varying size and shape.

== Discovery ==
Reactive lymphocytes were originally described by W. Türk in 1907 in the peripheral blood of patients with infectious mononucleosis. Later in 1923 the features of the reactive lymphocytes were characterized in greater detail by Hal Downey and C.A. McKinlay, who also discovered the association with EBV and CMV.

== Morphology ==
Downey and McKinlay first described the atypical lymphocytes seen in cases of infectious mononucleosis. They further categorized the atypical lymphocytes of different etiologies under three subtypes:

1. Type I as highly differentiated "leukocytoid lymphocyte", round-to-lobulated nucleus, mature clumped chromatin with or without nucleoli and with varying degree of basophilia in the cytoplasm.
2. Type II as larger cells with round-to-lobulated nucleus, chromatin resembling that of plasma cells, moderate amount of cytoplasm with mild basophilia.
3. Type III cells are large cells with a round to slightly indented nucleus, chromatin mostly immature with diffuse sieve-like arrangements and nucleoli.

Morphological features and typical appearances of reactive/atypical lymphocytes.
Morphological feature	Atypical lymphocyte — Downey's categorization —		
Morphological feature	Type I (monocyte-like)	Type II (plasma cell-like)	Type III (lymphoblast-like)
Size	≥16 µm	≥16 µm	≥16 µm
Nuclear features	Kidney-shaped or segmented	Fine nucleus; Nucleolus (±)	Agglutinated chromatin; Nucleolus (±)
Cytoplasm	Strongly basophilic; Vacuoles (±)	Strongly basophilic	Strongly basophilic
Intracytoplasmic granules	—	Azurophilic granules (±)	—
Typical morphology	Type I (monocyte-like) atypical lymphocyte	Type II (plasma cell-like) atypical lymphocyte	Type III (lymphoblast-like) atypical lymphocyte

Downey type II cell is the most common type of reactive lymphocyte. In general, those cells may vary in morphologic detail as well as surface marker characteristics since this is the result of a polyclonal immune response to antigenic stimulation. All three types of Downey cells were observed along with some other variants such as larger cells with deeply convoluted nucleus, cells with crystalline rods and granules in the cytoplasm, flame cells, Mott cells, and some intermediate forms. Flame cells are plasma cells characterized by a pink fringe of cytoplasm, often observed in the bone marrow of cats, especially in conditions such as multiple myeloma and chronic infections.

The common features of reactive lymphocytes:

- larger than normal size, sometimes with a diameter of more than 30 microns;
- nucleus can be round, elliptic, indented, cleft, or folded;
- the cytoplasm is often abundant and can be basophilic – most often, the cytoplasm is gray, pale blue, or deep blue in color;
- vacuoles and/or azurophilic granules are also sometimes present;
- histochemistry shows increased concentrations of acid phosphatase, phosphorylase, and non-specific esterase;
- prominent clusters and rosettes of free ribosome;
- presence of small vacuoles near the edge of the cytoplasm as well as invaginations in the cell surface.

=== Molecular markers ===
Atypical lymphocyte population often express features of activated CD8+ T cells, such as CD29, CD38, HLA-DR, CD45RO and CD95. Expression of CD25 was on the other hand decreased.

Expressed molecular markers may vary depending on many factors. For example, CD57 expression seems to be significantly decreased only in patients with EBV infections.

== Function ==
The atypical lymphocytes have been best studied from blood of patients with infectious mononucleosis. Early studies suspect that atypical lymphocytes could have both T or B cells features; now it is more suggested that reactive lymphocytes are activated T-lymphocytes produced in response to infected B-lymphocytes.

Reactive lymphocytes have been found to accumulate in areas of inflammation like the liver and pharynx of individuals with infectious mononucleosis and skin window preparations. In infectious mononucleosis, the atypical lymphocytes are one component of a normal immune system that helps to control potentially fatal Epstein-Barr virus-induced B-cell lymphoma in human.

== Causes ==
Reactive lymphocytes are usually associated with viral illnesses, but they can also be present as a result of drug reactions (such as phenytoin), immunizations, radiation, and hormonal causes (such as stress and Addison's disease), as well as some autoimmune disorders (such as rheumatoid arthritis).

Some pathogen-related causes include:

- Epstein–Barr virus
- Cytomegalovirus
- Toxoplasma gondii
- Treponema pallidum (syphilis)
- Streptococcus agalactiae (group B streptococci)
- Hepatitis C
- Hantavirus

=== Association with COVID-19 ===
The presence of Downey cells were observed in many COVID-19 cases, together with the atypical plasmacytoid lymphocytes (which could be one of the less usual atypical lymphocyte types).

Some observations even suggest that the presence of particular reactive lymphocytes in some of the infected patients could be an indicator of a better prognosis of the disease.

== See also ==
- T cell
- Infectious mononucleosis
