= Owl's eye appearance =

Pattern in medical radiology and histopathology

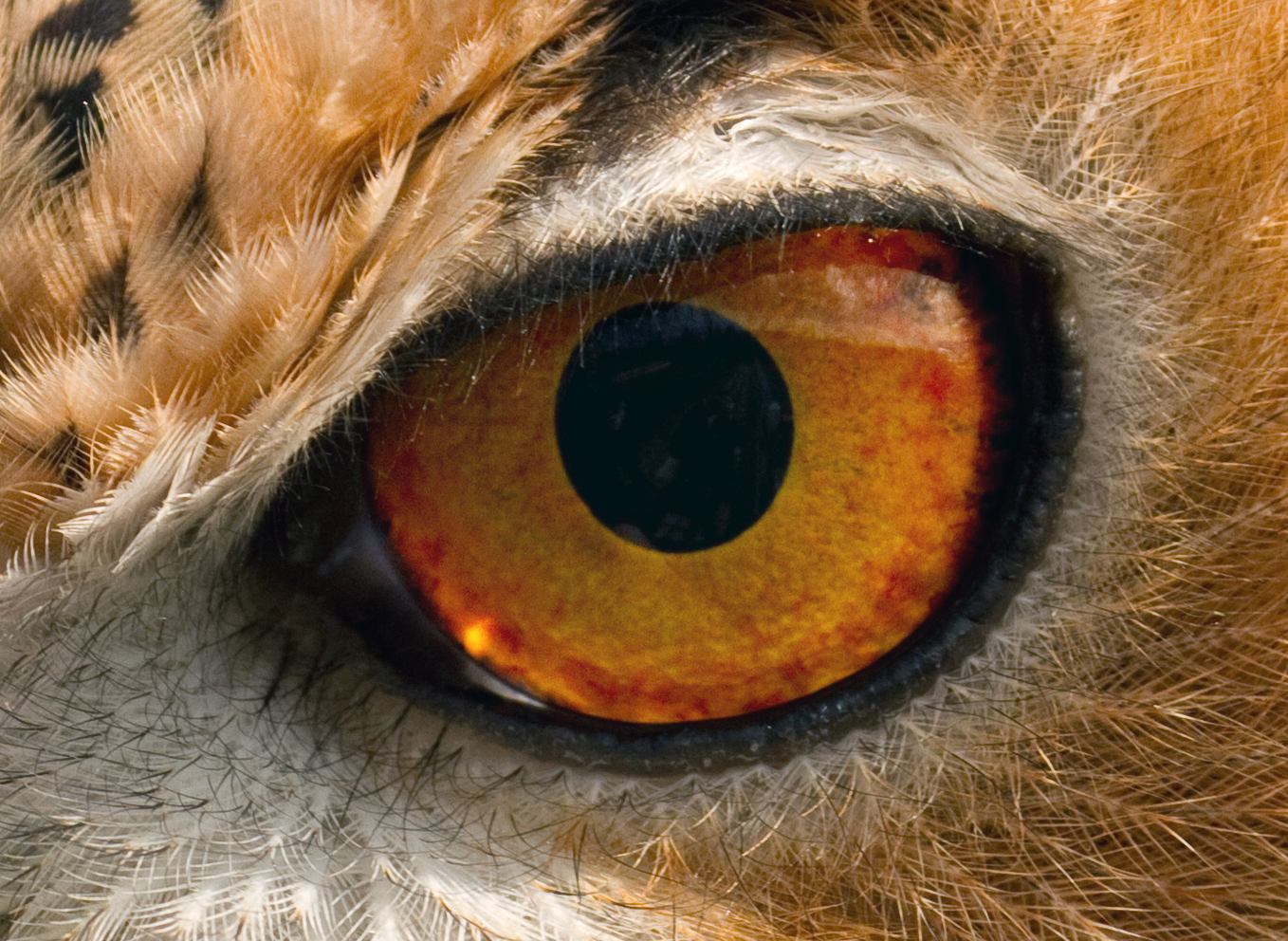
The eye of an owl

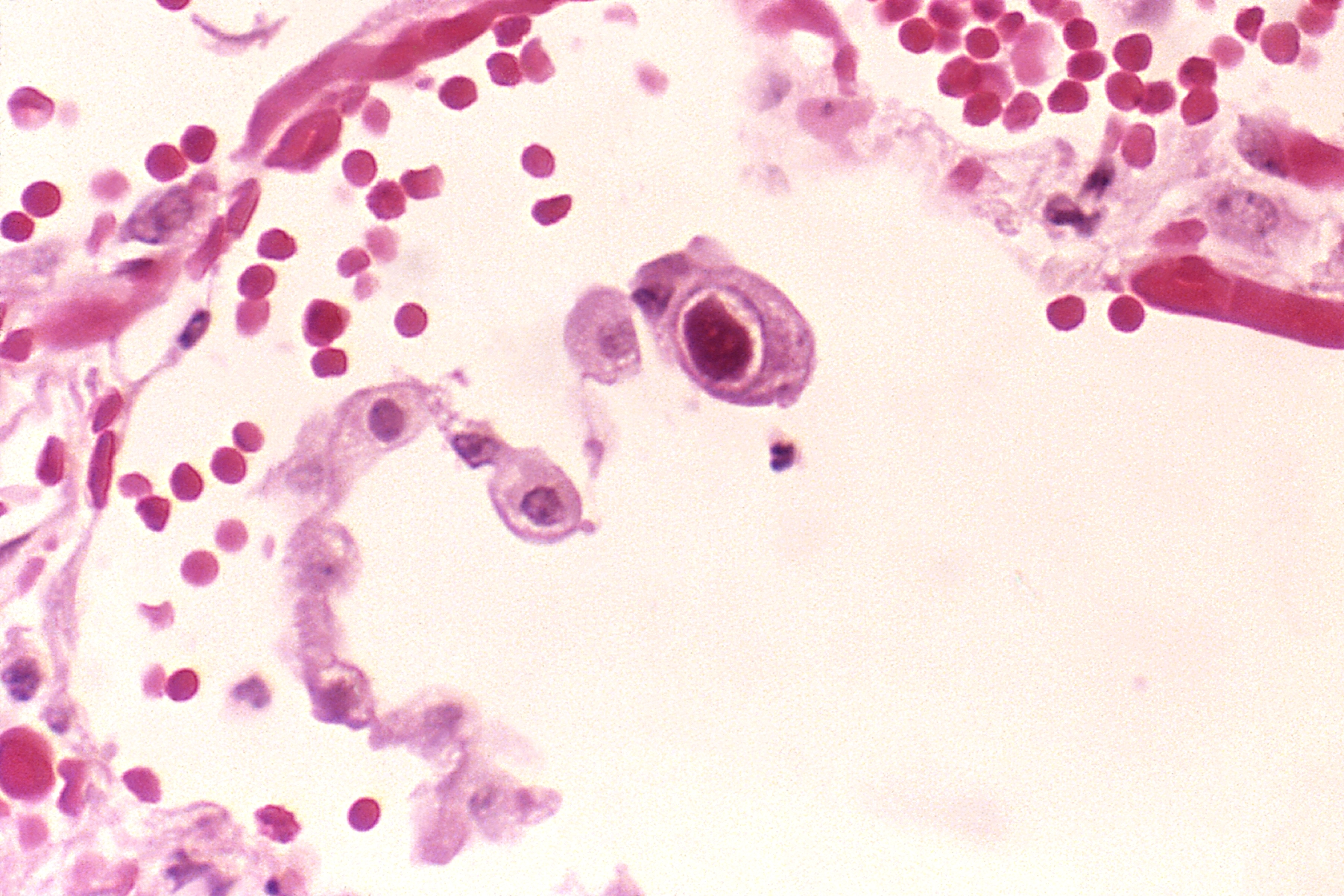
Cytomegalovirus infection of a lung pneumocyte, showing owl's eye appearance of a large cell at center

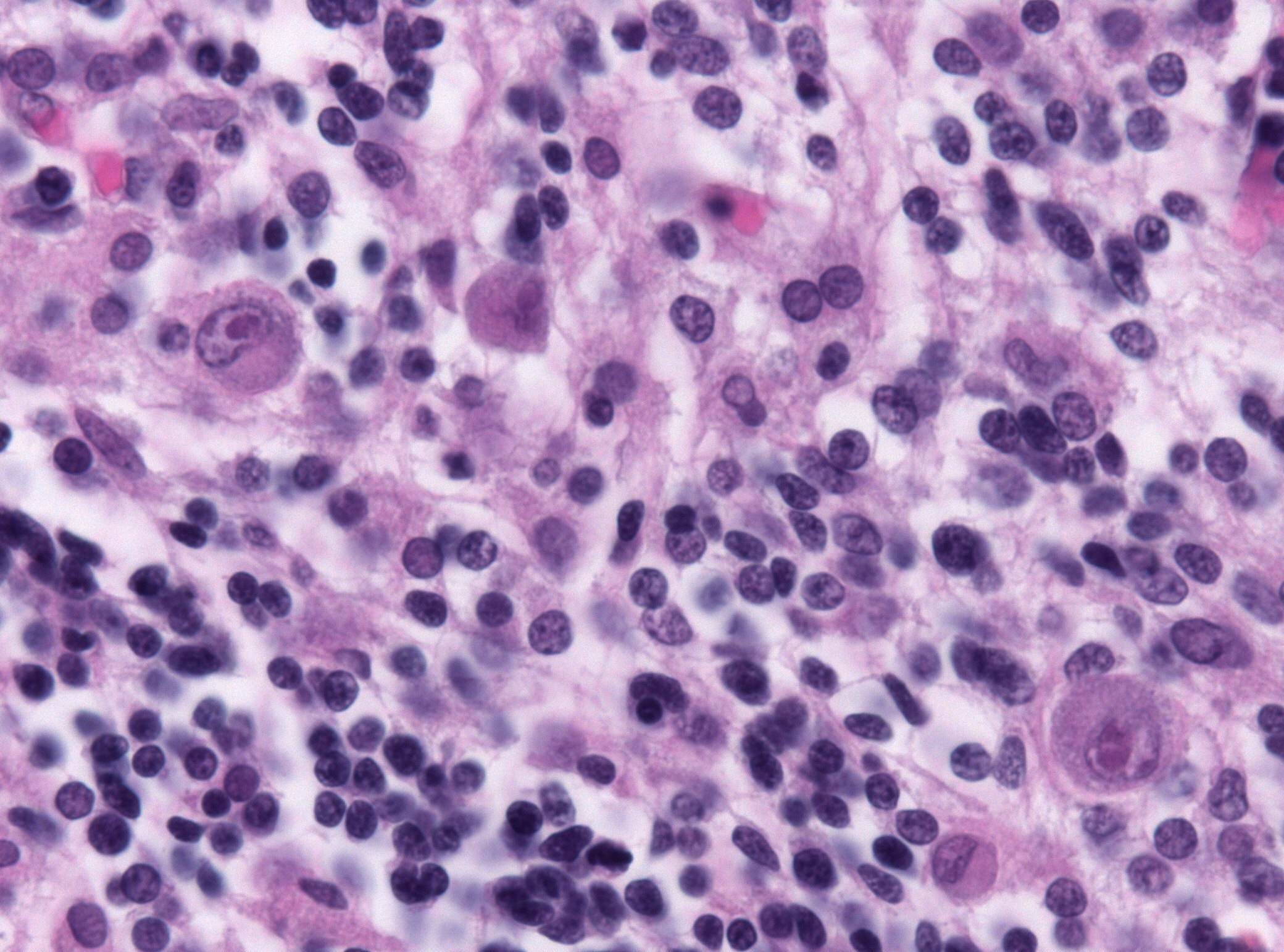
Cytomegalovirus neuronal inclusions showing the owl's eye sign

Owl's eye appearance, also known as owl's eye sign, is a pattern used in the medical field to describe cells (or cell attributes) that resemble the shape of an actual owl's eye. Using the techniques of histology and radiology, microscopes and other medical imaging are used to locate this pattern of "owl's eye" shaped cells. The term may be applied to the appearance of the cells themselves, or to aspects of their morphology, such as reference to an "owl eye nucleus". The presence of "owl's eye" cells has been linked to a variety of conditions, such as in the pathology of Hodgkin's lymphoma, a form of cancer. In particular, owl's eye appearance has been used to indicate the presence of cytomegalovirus (CMV), a genus of virus found in humans and other primates.

The description "owl's eye" may refer to:

- Cells with perinuclear vacuolization around centrally located pyknotic nuclei, such as typically seen in flat warts.
- The appearance of inclusion bodies within the cell, which is highly specific for cytomegalovirus infection (CMV).
- The appearance of the entire nucleus, as found in Reed–Sternberg cells in individuals with Hodgkin's lymphoma.

== Use in pathology ==
The owl's eye appearance has a relationship with Reed–Sternberg cells in regard to cytomegalovirus infection. Owl's eye appearance was used as an indication of the presence of the cytomegalovirus for the following case studies.

In 1982, a textbook wrote a chapter on cytomegalovirus and elaborated on its further relevance to owl's eye appearances. It was stated that the owl's eye had a characteristic of a clear halo that extended towards the cell membrane's nucleus. The cellular structure was found to be relevant to pneumonia which was caused by cytomegalovirus.

In a 1986 case study, a journal wrote that an owl's eye appearance was found in a total of 10 out of 10 patients. This was apparently due to the cytomegalovirus found in the patients that were also found to be diagnosed with AIDS. This case study involved CT scans that were used as a proposal as a way to detect the cytomegalovirus; however, the case study found that the cytomegalovirus had little relevance to the ability of CT scans.

In 1987, a 33-year-old man diagnosed with AIDS was discovered with the cytomegalovirus in his eyes. The presence of an owl's eye appearance indicated the hospital that this patient was infected with the cytomegalovirus.

In 1990, a case study journal found that the owl's eye appearance correlated with the appearance of HIV infection. This was where the case study involved the study of hospital cases and concluding that HIV plays a role in certain symptoms such as diarrhea. In another case study journal, the owl's eye appearances were found within the four patients that were observed. These patients were diagnosed with AIDS, and the presence of the owl's eye appearances proved the presence of cytomegalovirus. The confirmation of this virus was by the use of immunohistochemistry.

In a 2000 case study, it was discovered that the owl's eye appearance as a cell body was key for the histopathological understanding of the cytomegalovirus. The study found a strong relationship with a positive CMV PCR (p < 0.001). The discovery led to a result that owl's eye appearances were a strong sign for finding cytomegalovirus inside organs.

In 2006, a case study journal wrote that owls' eye signs were found in patients with compromised immune system. The purpose of this case study was to identify the features of the cytomegalovirus itself and the appearance of owl's eyes in relevance.

In 2009, a case study journal found a 44-year-old male patient to be infected with the cytomegalovirus. The presence of an eye's owl appearance found within the infected area, gave the necessary clues to confirm cytomegalovirus infection. A different case study found the appearance of an owl's eye in eighteen patients who were induced with drugs with a syndrome. The case study concluded that the cytomegalovirus disease was present, as the syndrome caused these patients to compromise their immune system. The case also found that the significant decrease of white blood cells was a factor in the preliminary stage of cytomegalovirus infection.

In 2011, a second edition textbook found that an owl's eye appearance was found inside a dead retina. It was found due to the cause of the cytomegalovirus that had been residing inside an eye causing it to transition from healthy to dead.

In 2012, a journal was written on patients with cytomegalovirus infection and was used in mapping out the owl's eye cells using their microscopic technology. The patients were two elderly men at ages 75 and 77 years old. The image of the owl's eye appearance was created using the microscope via lasers, and two-dimensional images were created using computer software. The conclusion made by the journal was that the owl's eye had relevance to cytomegalovirus infection.

In 2019, a four-year-old boy was found with acute flaccid paralysis and was found to have an owl's eye appearance. The case also spoke on the presence of enterovirus. The boy was also found to have a compromised immune system, which the enterovirus came through in infection. This case is unique due to the owl's eye appearance in relevance to the enterovirus.

== Histological cases ==
Owl's eye appearances were also found within tissues and organs and are tied with histopathological cases. Most of these cases are also relevant to the pathology cases. However, these cases focused more on the specifics of a singular organ or tissue where the owl's eye appeared. These cases also have moderate relevance to the cytomegalovirus.

In 1983, a journal wrote on a case study that found owl's eye appearance within the human eyes with the presence of potential cytomegalovirus with a deficient immune system. This was from the symptoms of inflammation that gave the diagnosis of an immune system to be deficient.

In 1985, a journal wrote that the appearance of owl's eye signs was due to the presence of inflammatory bowel disease. This finding created a suspicion that the patient, in this case, was, infected with the cytomegalovirus infection. However, further investigations showed that the patient was leading to a weak immune system. The patient was also identified as an 80-year-old man with a short-term case of diarrhea of blood and mucus, which was not contained and resulted in his death. The autopsy found the presence of cytomegalovirus this way.

In 2002, a rare case study journal wrote that a range of cytomegalovirus could infect patients diagnosed with AIDS and compromised immune systems. However, it was rare to involve the patient's skin. The skin at the cellular level was found to have owl's eye appearance and was concluded after several tests to be the cytomegalovirus infection.

In 2007, a journal wrote about the presence of owls' eye appearance as cells found in a transplant to a patient. The owl's eye appearance was considered rare for cytomegalovirus infection in the transplant, but was considered concerning. The cytomegalovirus infection was found of relevance towards compromised immune patients, as previous cases show that immune problems for patients have a similar case of cytomegalovirus infection.

In 2015, a review journal wrote on herpes infection. It made a finding that owl's eye appearance was found in most organs through the investigation of a liver transplant. This provides evidence that the appearance of an owl's eye allowed the doctors to diagnose that cytomegalovirus infection from the liver transplant can be detected through detection tools.

In 2019, a case study was conducted on a series of patients that were infected with cytomegalovirus, and found the presence of the owl's eye appearance due to the presence of the virus. These owl's eye appearances were able to conclude that high-risk patients had a higher risk of cytomegalovirus.

=== Special cases ===
Another particular case in 1957 found that an owl's eye appearance was found by two cells mirroring each other, producing the pattern inside the histological case study of tumors. This is essentially what an owl's eye appearance is, however, the symptom did not occur from the presence of cytomegalovirus but from a unique case.

In another particular case in 1999, a case study was conducted by investigating a series of babies and found a baby with the presence of an owl's sign which was also found to be known as an eye mask. This had to do with the presence of a rash, not the reality of cytomegalovirus.

In a particular case in 2011, the owl's eye appearance was found within the cellular structure of the spinal ganglia.

== Radiology cases ==
Owl's eye appearance is also found within radiology images from X-rays and CT scans. They appear as an indication of a clue to be used for analyzing the problem. These scans so far do not indicate that the owl's eye appearance found within radiology has any relevance towards the cytomegalovirus infection within patients. An example of the appearance of an owl's eye appearing within an image is of a skeleton within the bone structure, especially in the spinal cord.

In 2009, a journal wrote on the presence of an owl's eye appearance that was found within the skeletal structure from the magnetic resonance imaging (MRI) scan in regards to compression of the spinal cord. The owl's eye sign indicated that the spinal issues may be similar to other spinal cord cases and can be used to identify future cases.

In 2012, a case study journal article was written on a 10-year-old boy and discovered the owl's eye appeared inside the brain from an MRI scan. In the findings, it was found that the owl eye's sign was seen when doing neuroradiology images. The owl's eye sign was also detected from the spinal cord in spine MRI scans conducted post-treatment for the boy.

In 2015, a case study on owl's eye sign was found in a neuroimaging via MRI, which was rare due to the patient's diagnosis. The patient was found with Flailing Arm Syndrome.

In June 2016, a journal article was written on a central pontine myelinolysis presence. And from doing radiology scans within the brain, they were able to find observations of owl's eye signs that also resembled similar to monkey signs. The owl's eye appearance was also used as a sign in the MRI scans conducted in the scanning of the brain to show its relevance to the patient's diagnosed profile. In September 2016, a journal article examined MRI scans relevant to spinal cord conditions. These tests found owls' eye appearance as they were relevant to spinal cords in past cases. The journal concluded that the owl's eyes were not a main characteristic of tissue death.

A textbook has stated that within radiology, the appearance of an owl's eye can be seen from the cells and neurological disorders. This textbook is a clinical review textbook and has provided relevance between owl's eye signs and neurological imaging.

=== Special cases ===
It was found that a 1986 case study found that CT scans were of little effect when trying to find cytomegalovirus in the presence of owl's eye appearance.
