= Allan Watt Downie =

Scottish microbiologist

Allan Watt Downie FRS (5 September 1901 – 26 January 1988) was a Scottish microbiologist involved in the eradication of smallpox. He was elected a Fellow of the Royal Society in March 1955.

Downie bodies are named for him.

== See also ==
- Hal Downey
