= Guarnieri =

Guarnieri is an Italian surname. Notable people with the surname include:

- Adriano Guarnieri (skier) (1914–1983), Italian alpine skier
- Adriano Guarnieri (composer) (born 1947), Italian classical composer
- Albert Guarnieri (1899–1980), American football player
- Albina Guarnieri (born 1953), Italian-born Canadian politician
- Anna Maria Guarnieri (born 1933), Italian actress
- Antonio Guarnieri (1880–1952), Italian classical cellist and conductor
- Camargo Guarnieri (1907–1993), Brazilian composer
- Danilo Caro Guarnieri (born 1965), Colombian trap shooter
- Ennio Guarnieri (1930–2019), Italian cinematographer
- Gianfrancesco Guarnieri (1934–2006), Brazilian actor, lyricist, poet and playwright
- Giuseppe Guarnieri (1856–1918), Italian physician
- Jacopo Guarnieri (born 1987), Italian cyclist
- Johnny Guarnieri (1917–1985), American musician
- Luiz Carlos Guarnieri (born 1971), Brazilian footballer
- Rodolfo Guarnieri (1927–2019), Argentine former sports shooter
- Umberto Guarnieri (1919–1973), Italian footballer

== See also ==
- Guarneri, family of luthiers from Cremona
