= Neuroserpin =

Protein-coding gene in the species Homo sapiens

SERPINI1
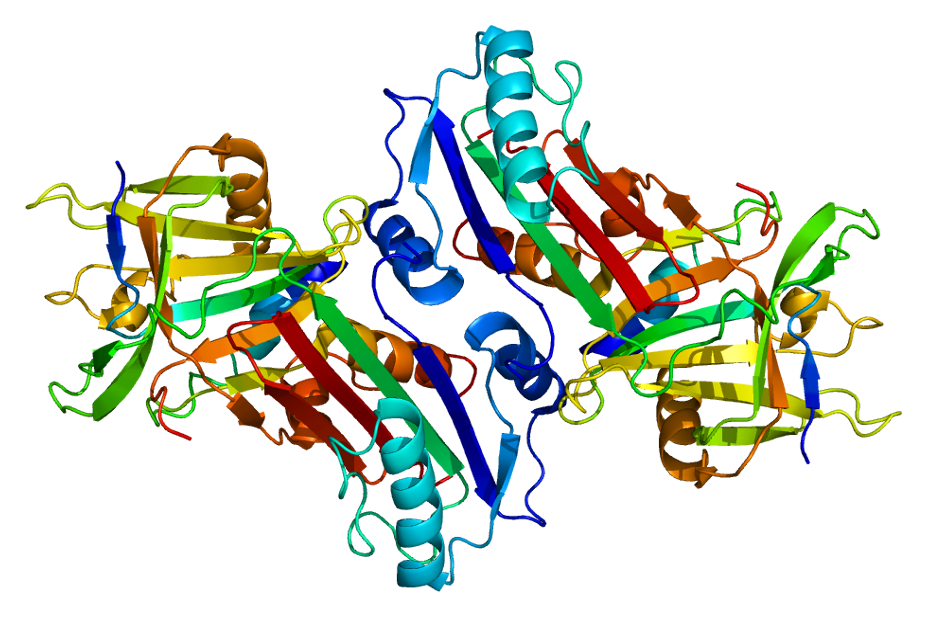

Identifiers
- Aliases: SERPINI1, PI12, neuroserpin, serpin family I member 1, HNS-S2, HNS-S1
- External IDs: OMIM: 602445; MGI: 1194506; GeneCards: SERPINI1
Available structures
PDB	Ortholog search: PDBe RCSB
PDB	List of PDB id codes 3F02, 3F5N, 3FGQ

Gene location (Human)
Chr.	Chromosome 3 (human)
Band	3q26.1	Start	167,735,243 bp
Band	3q26.1	End	167,825,569 bp

Gene location (Mouse)
Chr.	Chromosome 3 (mouse)
Band	3|3 E3	Start	75,464,854 bp
Band	3|3 E3	End	75,550,802 bp
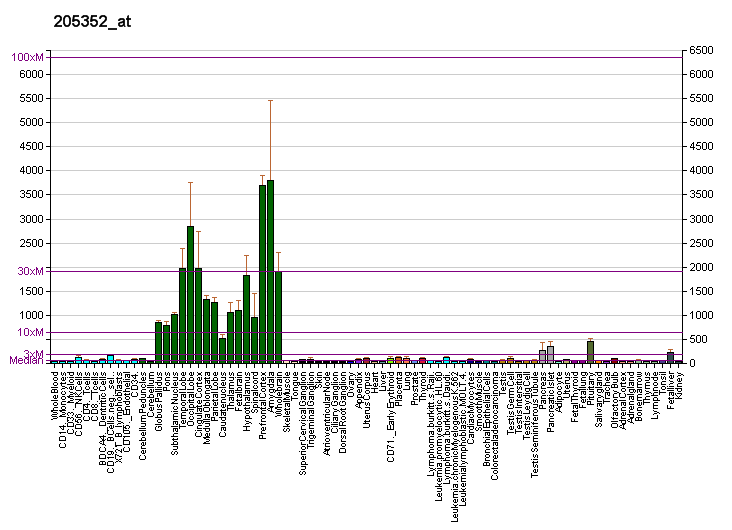
RNA expression pattern
Bgee	Human / Mouse (ortholog); Top expressed in: frontal pole; orbitofrontal cortex; Brodmann area 10; middle temporal gyrus; superior frontal gyrus; Brodmann area 23; postcentral gyrus; dorsolateral prefrontal cortex; endothelial cell; Brodmann area 46 / Top expressed in: Region I of hippocampus proper; mammillary body; prefrontal cortex; primary motor cortex; subiculum; perirhinal cortex; piriform cortex; CA3 field; ventral tegmental area; dorsal tegmental nucleus; More reference expression data
BioGPS	More reference expression data
Gene ontology
Molecular function	peptidase inhibitor activity; serine-type endopeptidase inhibitor activity
Cellular component	extracellular region; extracellular exosome; secretory granule lumen; soma; cytoplasmic vesicle lumen; extracellular space; cytoplasmic vesicle; perikaryon
Biological process	central nervous system development; negative regulation of peptidase activity; regulation of cell adhesion; peripheral nervous system development; negative regulation of endopeptidase activity; positive regulation of neuron projection development
Sources:Amigo / QuickGO
Orthologs
Databases	NCBI: entry; OMA: entry
Species	Human	Mouse
Entrez	5274	20713
Ensembl	ENSG00000163536	ENSMUSG00000027834
UniProt	Q99574	O35684
RefSeq (mRNA)	NM_005025; NM_001122752	NM_009250; NM_001357514
RefSeq (protein)	NP_001116224; NP_005016	NP_033276; NP_001344443
Location (UCSC)	Chr 3: 167.74 – 167.83 Mb	Chr 3: 75.46 – 75.55 Mb
PubMed search
- Wikidata
View/Edit Human	View/Edit Mouse

Neuroserpin is a protein that in humans is encoded by the SERPINI1 gene.

It is associated with Familial encephalopathy with neuroserpin inclusion bodies.

Serine protease inhibitors of the serpin superfamily are involved in many cellular processes. Neuroserpin was first identified as a protein secreted from the axons of dorsal root ganglion neurons (Stoeckli et al., 1989). It is expressed in the late stages of neurogenesis during the process of synapse formation.[supplied by OMIM]

== Interactions ==
SERPINI1 has been shown to interact with Tissue plasminogen activator.
