= Russell bodies =

Cellular inclusion body

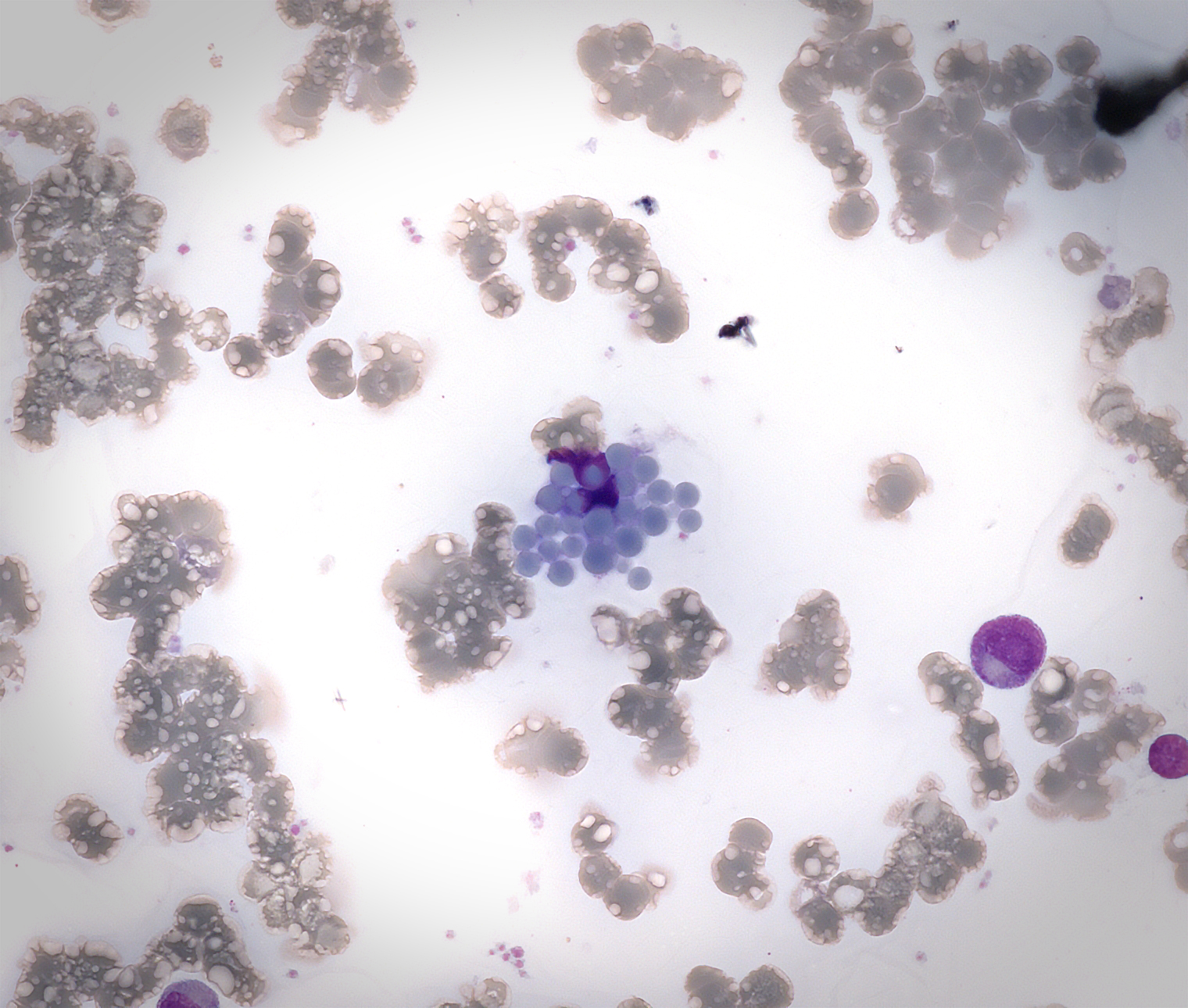
Mott cells with Russell bodies.

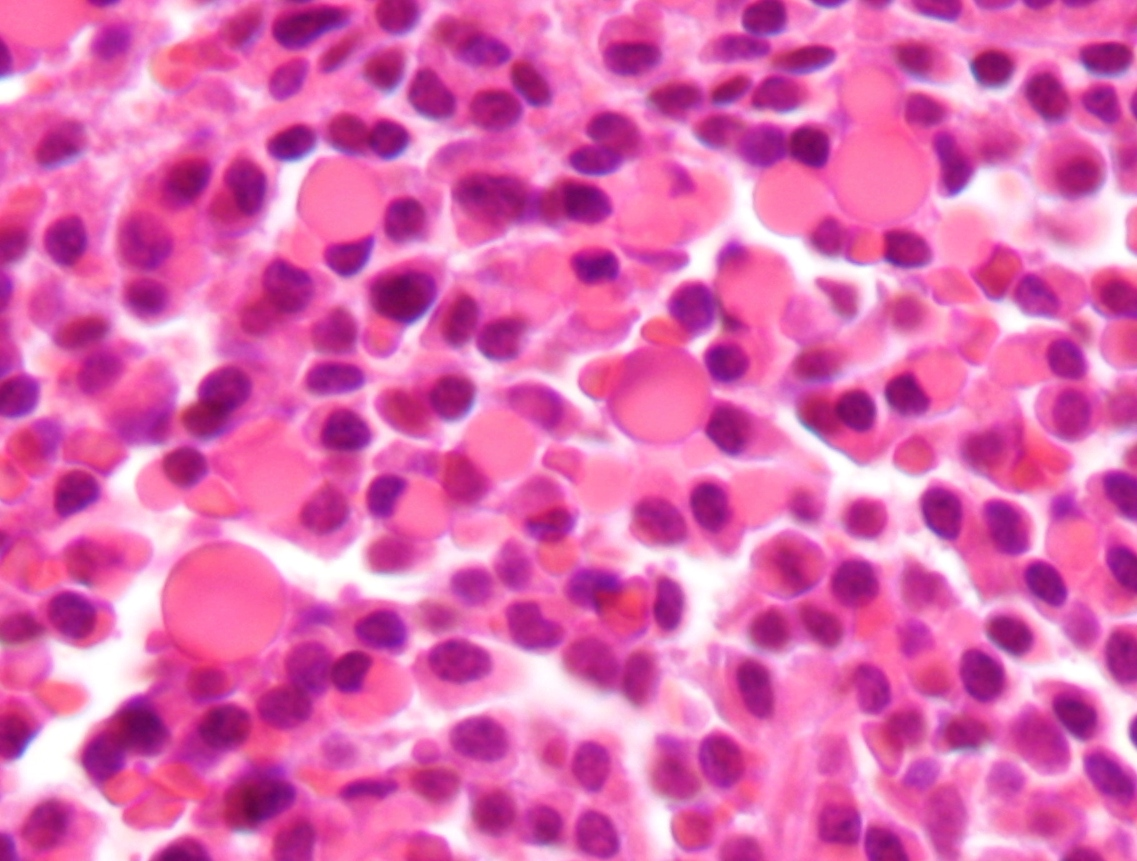
Plasmacytoma with abundant Russell bodies. H&E stain.

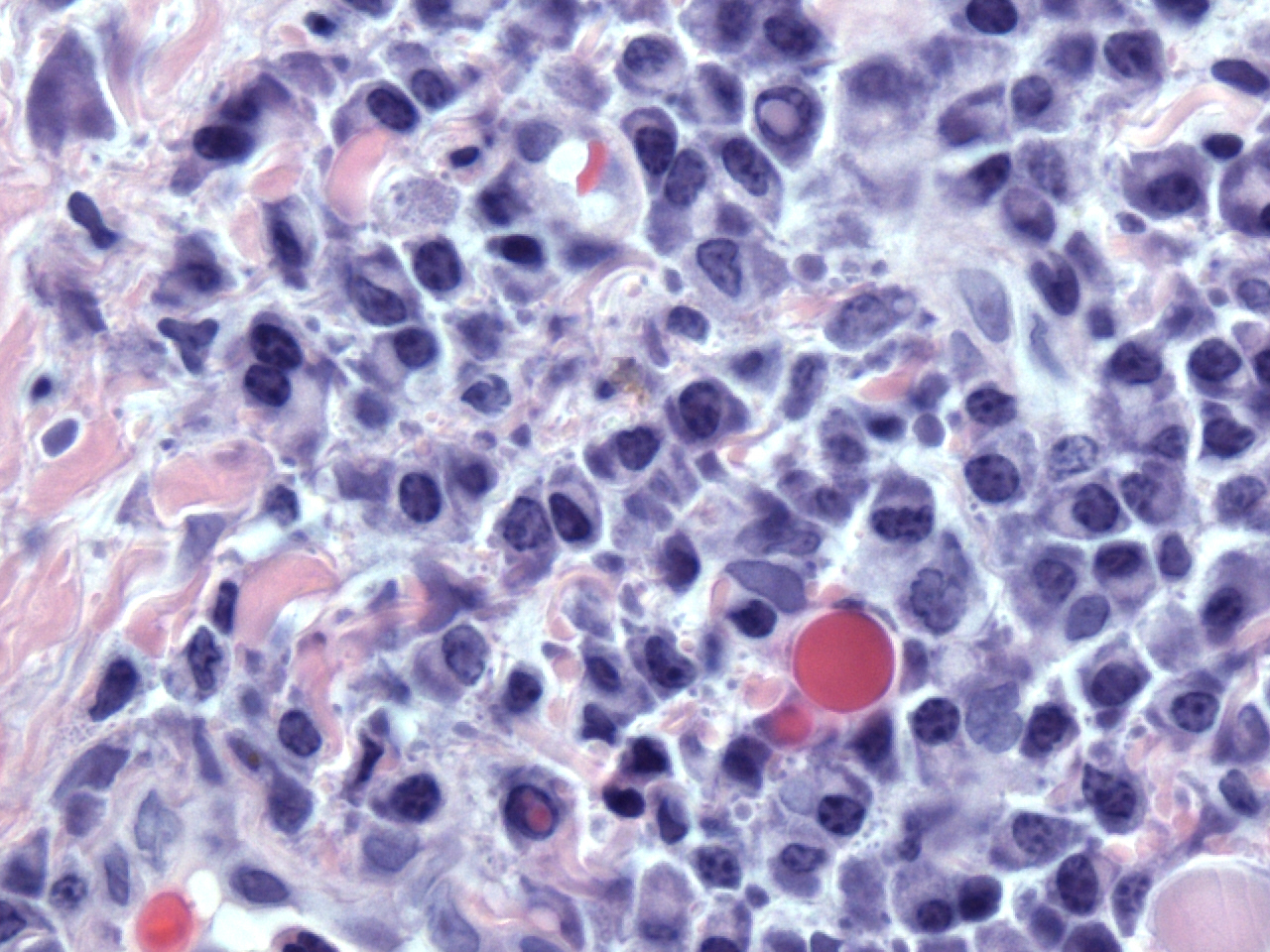
Dutcher and Russell bodies. H&E stain.

Russell bodies are inclusion bodies usually found in atypical plasma cells that become known as Mott cells. Russell bodies are eosinophilic, homogeneous immunoglobulin (Ig)-containing inclusions usually found in cells undergoing excessive synthesis of Ig; the Russell body is characteristic of the distended endoplasmic reticulum. Russell bodies are large and globular of varying size, and become packed into the cell's cytoplasm pushing the nucleus to the edge of the cell, and are found in the peripheral areas of tumors. Russell bodies are thought to have originated as abnormal proteins that have not been secreted. The excess immunoglobulin builds up and forms intracytoplasmic globules, which is thought to be a result of insufficient protein transport within the cell. This causes the proteins to neither be degraded or secreted and stay stored in dilated cisternae. In 1949, Pearse discovered that Russell bodies also contain mucoproteins that are secreted by plasma cells. Russell bodies are not tissue specific; during research they were induced in rat glioma cells. Russell bodies were found to have positive reactions to PAS stain, CD 38 and CD 138 stains. Plasma cells that contain Russell bodies and are stained with H&E stain are found to be autofluorescent, while those without Russell bodies are not. Russell bodies tend to be found in places with chronic inflammation.

This is one cell variation found in multiple myeloma.

Similar inclusion bodies that tend to overlie the nucleus or invaginate into it are known as Dutcher bodies.

They are named for William Russell (1852–1940), a Scottish physician.
