= Giuseppe Guarnieri =

Italian physician

- Born: 20 April 1856; Offida, Italy
- Died: 15 August 1918 (aged 62); Offida, Italy
- Known for: Discovering Guarnieri bodies

Giuseppe Guarnieri (20 April 1856 – 15 August 1918) was an Italian physician.

Dr. Guarnieri made his most famous discovery in 1892 while examining thin tissue cells damaged by smallpox. He discovered small bodies of protein clusters that he mistook for bacteria, but were actually clusters of viral proteins crucial in the replication of pox viruses. He named these protein masses Cytorrhyctes variolae ("the cell destroyer of smallpox") but they were eventually properly identified and named Guarnieri bodies.
