= Critical green inclusion =

Abnormal white blood cell inclusion

Critical green inclusions
- Other names: Green neutrophilic inclusions, death crystals, crystals of death
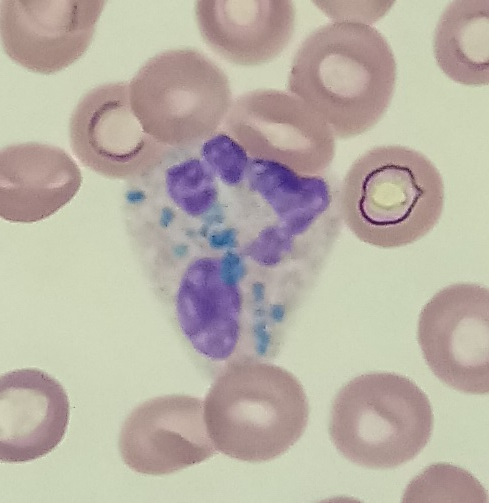
- Critical green inclusions in a neutrophil
- Specialty: Hematology

Critical green inclusions, also known as green neutrophilic inclusions and informally, death crystals or crystals of death, are amorphous blue-green cytoplasmic inclusions found in neutrophils and occasionally in monocytes. They appear brightly coloured and refractile when stained with Wright-Giemsa stain. These inclusions are most commonly found in critically ill patients, particularly those with acute liver failure. Their presence on the peripheral blood smear is associated with a high short-term mortality rate.

== Clinical significance ==
Critical green inclusions are a rare finding, and when found they are suggestive of a poor prognosis, hence the colloquial term death crystals. A 2018 review found that 56% of patients died shortly after the inclusions were first identified (usually within two weeks). However, critical green inclusions are of limited utility for predicting mortality because they are usually found in severely ill patients whose poor prognosis is already evident for other reasons by the time the crystals are detected.

The inclusions were once hypothesized to be bile products phagocytized during fulminant hepatic injury, due to the high incidence of critical green inclusions observed in cases of acute hypoxic and ischaemic hepatitis. However, recent studies have highlighted that the inclusions stain positive for Oil Red O as opposed to bile stains, suggesting high lipid content. Additionally, some cases with critical green inclusions were not associated with notable hepatic injury. Currently, it is suggested that critical green inclusions are more likely to be phagocytized products of lysosomal degradation related to tissue injury.

== Composition ==
The composition of the inclusions is not well understood, but transmission electron microscopy has shown that they are rich in lipids and possibly related to lipofuscin. Microscopic examination of liver tissue in patients with critical green inclusions has demonstrated prominent deposition of lipofuscin, suggesting that the white blood cell inclusions represent phagocytosis of this substance following severe injury to the liver.
