= Viral Bioinformatics Resource Center =

Online resource providing genomes and tools

The Viral Bioinformatics Resource Center (VBRC) is an online resource providing access to a database of curated viral genomes and a variety of tools for bioinformatic genome analysis. This resource was one of eight BRCs (Bioinformatics Resource Centers) funded by NIAID with the goal of promoting research against emerging and re-emerging pathogens, particularly those seen as potential bioterrorism threats. The VBRC is now supported by Dr. Chris Upton at the University of Victoria.

The curated VBRC database contains all publicly available genomic sequences for poxviruses and African Swine Fever Viruses (ASFV). A unique aspect of this resource relative to other genomic databases is its grouping of all annotated genes into ortholog groups (i.e. protein families) based on pre-run BLASTP sequence similarity searches.

The curated database is accessed through VOCS (Viral Orthologous Clusters), a downloadable Java-based user interface, and acts as the central information source for other programs of the VBRC workbench. These programs serve a variety of bioinformatic analysis functions (whole- or subgenome alignments, genome display, and several types of gene/protein sequence analysis). The majority of these tools are programmed to take user-supplied input as well.

== Virus families covered in the VBRC database ==
The VBRC covers the following viruses:

- Poxviridae
- Asfarviridae

== Organization of the VBRC database ==
The VBRC database stores viral bioinformatic data on three levels:

1. Whole genomes. This level contains information about the virus species or isolate and its entire genomic sequence.
2. Annotated genes. This level contains all the predicted ORFs (open reading frames) in a particular virus genome, together with their DNA and (translated) protein sequences.
3. Ortholog groups (families). This level is a distinguishing feature of the VBRC database. Each annotated gene, after it has been entered into the database, is subjected to BLASTP searching against all other genes already in the database. Based on the search results, it is either assigned to a pre-existing ortholog group or placed in a newly created ortholog group of its own. The goal of this level is to "allow for quick comparison of similar genes across a given virus family."

== Central Tools Provided by VBRC ==
VBRC provides researchers with a wide variety of database-linked tools. Of these, the central four programs are VOCs, VGO, BBB, and JDotter.

1. VOCs (Viral Orthologous Clusters)
  VOCs is the main database access interface. Users can search the available data by a number of criteria related to genome, gene, or ortholog group characteristics. Search results are displayed in table format; from here the user may obtain further information about a particular database entry, or launch a VOCs-linked tool (see below) for analysis of selected data. Additional analysis tools such as BLAST searches, genome maps, genome or gene alignment, phylogenetic trees, etc. are provided.
2. VGO (Viral Genome Organizer)
  VGO is a Java-based interface used for viewing and searching viral genome sequences. Together with a graphical representation of the selected VBRC (or user-supplied) genome, the program displays information relevant to a genome of interest, including its genes, ORFs and start/stop codons. Tools are provided allowing the user to perform regular expression, a fuzzy motif, and masslist searches. VGO can also be used to identify related genes across multiple sequences.
3. BBB (Base-by-Base)
  Base-By-Base is a platform-independent (Java-based), whole-genome pairwise and multiple alignment editor. The program highlights differences between consecutive pairs of sequences within an alignment, thus allowing the user to survey a large alignment at a single-residue level. Annotations from the VBRC database or user-supplied files are displayed alongside each sequence.
  Although Base-By-Base was intended as an editor and viewer for alignments of highly similar sequences, it also generates multiple alignments using Clustal Omega, T-Coffee and MUSCLE. Edit functions are provided to allow users to fine-tune such alignments manually; users may also annotate genomes with comments or primer sequences.
4. JDotter
  JDotter is a Java-based user interface providing VBRC-linked access to the Linux version of Dotter. JDotter can both access pre-processed dotplots of the genome and gene (DNA or protein) sequences available in the VBRC database, and take user input for generation of new dotplots. JDotter also interfaces with the curated database or the user-supplied file to display supplementary feature data such as gene annotations.

== Other Tools Provided by VBRC ==
VBRC provides a number of additional Java-based analysis tools on its website. The tools in this category are each designed to perform a very specific task (e.g. regular expression searches, DNA skew plotting) and, though they can be accessed as stand-alone programs with user-supplied input, most have increased utility when launched from the central VOCS application with VBRC-supplied data.

These additional tools are as follows:

- Sequence Searcher performs regular expression and fuzzy motif searches of DNA or protein sequences, and is built into VOCS.
- GFS (Genome Fingerprint Scanning) maps peptide mass fingerprint data to genomic sequences. It is built into VOCS.
- NAP (Nucleotide Amino Acid Alignment) is a Java interface to napC, a program designed to align a nucleotide and protein sequence, taking terminal gaps and insertion/deletion mutations into account. It can be accessed from VOCS.
- GraphDNA provides DNA skews and walks (a Cartesian plane-based representation of nucleotide content) from a VBRC database- or user-supplied DNA sequence. It is integrated into VOCS.
- Hydrophobicity Plotter generates a hydrophobicity graph for a VBRC database- or user-supplied protein sequence. Three hydrophobicity scales (Kyte-Doolittle, Hopp-Woods, and Parker-Guo-Hodges) are supported; the graphing procedure is based on a sliding window of user-determined length. It can be accessed from VOCS.
- GATU (Genome Annotation Transfer Utility) allows a user to annotate a newly sequenced genome based on the annotations present in a reference genome; it can also predict new genes in the query genome.

== See also ==
- Bioinformatics Resource Centers
- National Institute of Allergy and Infectious Diseases
- Bioinformatics
