= Hal Downey =

American hematologist (1877–1959)

Hal Downey (October 4, 1877 in State College, Pennsylvania–1959) was an American hematologist.

In 1923, he contributed to the characterization of reactive lymphocytes, which are sometimes called "Downey cells".

== See also ==
- Allan Watt Downie
