= Orthopoxvirus inclusion bodies =

Orthopoxvirus inclusion bodies are aggregates of stable protein produced by poxvirus virions in the cell nuclei and/or cytoplasm of epithelial cells in humans. They are important as sites of viral replication.

== Morphology ==
Morphologically, there are two types of Orthopoxvirus inclusion bodies: Type-A inclusion bodies and Guarnieri bodies. Type-A inclusion bodies are found only in certain poxviruses like cowpox. Guarnieri bodies are found in all poxvirus infections and their presence is diagnostic. The diagnosis of an orthopoxvirus infection can also be made rapidly by electron microscopic examination of pustular fluid or scabs. However, all orthopoxviruses exhibit identical brick-shaped virions by electron microscopy.

Guarnieri bodies are named for Giuseppe Guarnieri (1856–1918), an Italian physician who first described them.
