= Warthin–Finkeldey cell =

Type of giant multinucleate cell

A Warthin–Finkeldey cell is a type of giant multinucleate cell found in hyperplastic lymph nodes early in the course of measles and also in HIV-infected individuals, as well as in Kimura disease, and more rarely in a number of neoplastic (e.g. lymphoma) and non-neoplastic lymph node disorders. Their origin is uncertain, but they have previously been shown to stain with markers similar to those of follicular dendritic cells, including CD21. Under the light microscope, these cells consist of a large, grape-like cluster of nuclei.
