= Romanowsky stain =

Family of related stains for examination of blood

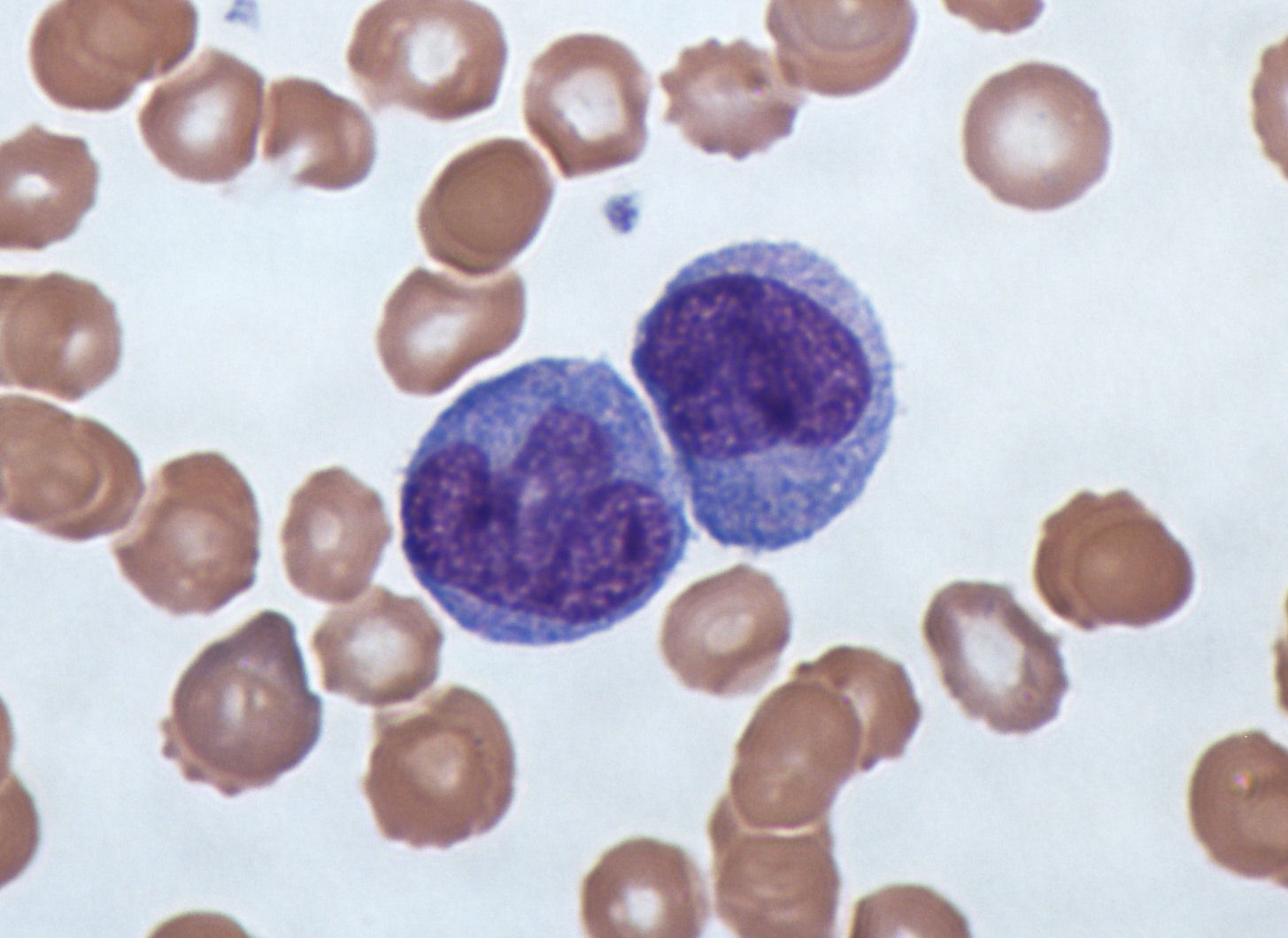
Blood film with Giemsa stain. Monocytes surrounded by erythrocytes.

Romanowsky staining is a prototypical staining technique that was the forerunner of several distinct but similar stains widely used in hematology (the study of blood) and cytopathology (the study of diseased cells). Romanowsky-type stains are used to differentiate cells for microscopic examination in pathological specimens, especially blood and bone marrow films, and to detect parasites such as malaria within the blood.

The staining technique is named after the Russian physician Dmitri Leonidovich Romanowsky (1861–1921), who was one of the first to recognize its potential for use as a blood stain.

Stains that are related to or derived from the Romanowsky-type stains include Giemsa, Jenner, Wright, Field, May–Grünwald, Pappenheim and Leishman stains. They differ in protocols and additives and their names are often confused with one another in practice.

== Mechanism ==
The value of Romanowsky staining lies in its ability to produce a wide range of hues, allowing cellular components to be easily differentiated. This phenomenon is referred to as the Romanowsky effect, or more generally as metachromasia.

Eosin part of the stain is responsible for pink-orange hue of erythrocytes and granules inside cytoplasms of eosinophilic leukocytes.

=== Romanowsky effect ===
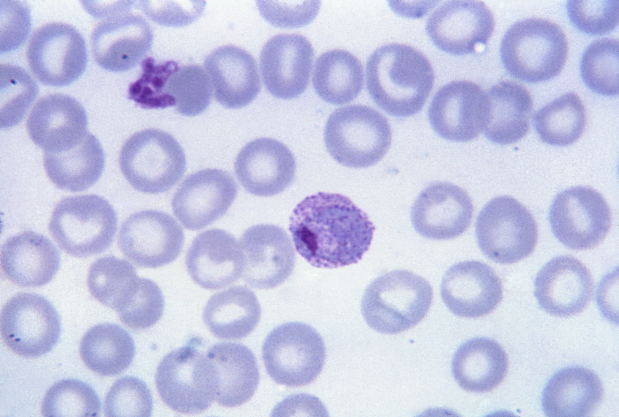
Blood film stained with Giemsa showing Plasmodium (center of image), the parasite that causes malaria infections.

In 1891 Romanowsky developed a stain using a mixture of eosin (typically eosin Y) and aged solutions of methylene blue that formed hues unattributable to the staining components alone: distinctive shades of purple in the chromatin of the cell nucleus and within granules in the cytoplasm of some leukocytes. This became known as the Romanowsky effect. Eosin and pure methylene blue alone (or in combination) do not produce the Romanowsky effect, and the active stains which produce the effect are now considered to be azure B and eosin.

=== Polychromed methylene blue ===
Romanowsky-type stains can be made from either a combination of pure dyes, or from methylene blue that has been subject to oxidative demethylation, which results in the breakdown of methylene blue into multiple other stains, some of which are necessary to produce the Romanowsky effect. Methylene blue that has undergone this oxidative process is known as "polychromed methylene blue". Polychromed methylene blue may contain up to 11 dyes, including methylene blue, azure A, azure B, azure C, thionine, methylene violet Bernthesen, methyl thionoline and thionoline. The exact composition of polychromed methylene blue depends on the method used, and even batches of the stain from the same manufacturer may vary in composition.

Common method of rapid oxidation uses increasing pH of the solution with potassium carbonate and boiling it, which introduces atmospheric oxygen. Other methods have been employed, as well, such as oxidation in acidic medium with dichromate anion.

Although azure B and eosin have been shown to be the required components to produce the Romanowsky effect, these stains in their pure forms have not always been used in the formulation of the staining solutions. The original sources of azure B (one of the oxidation products of methylene blue) were from polychromed methylene blue solutions, which were treated with oxidizing agents or allowed to naturally age in the case of Romanowsky. Ernst Malachowsky in 1891 was the first to purposely polychrome methylene blue for use in a Romanowsky-type stain.

== Types ==
=== Wright stain ===
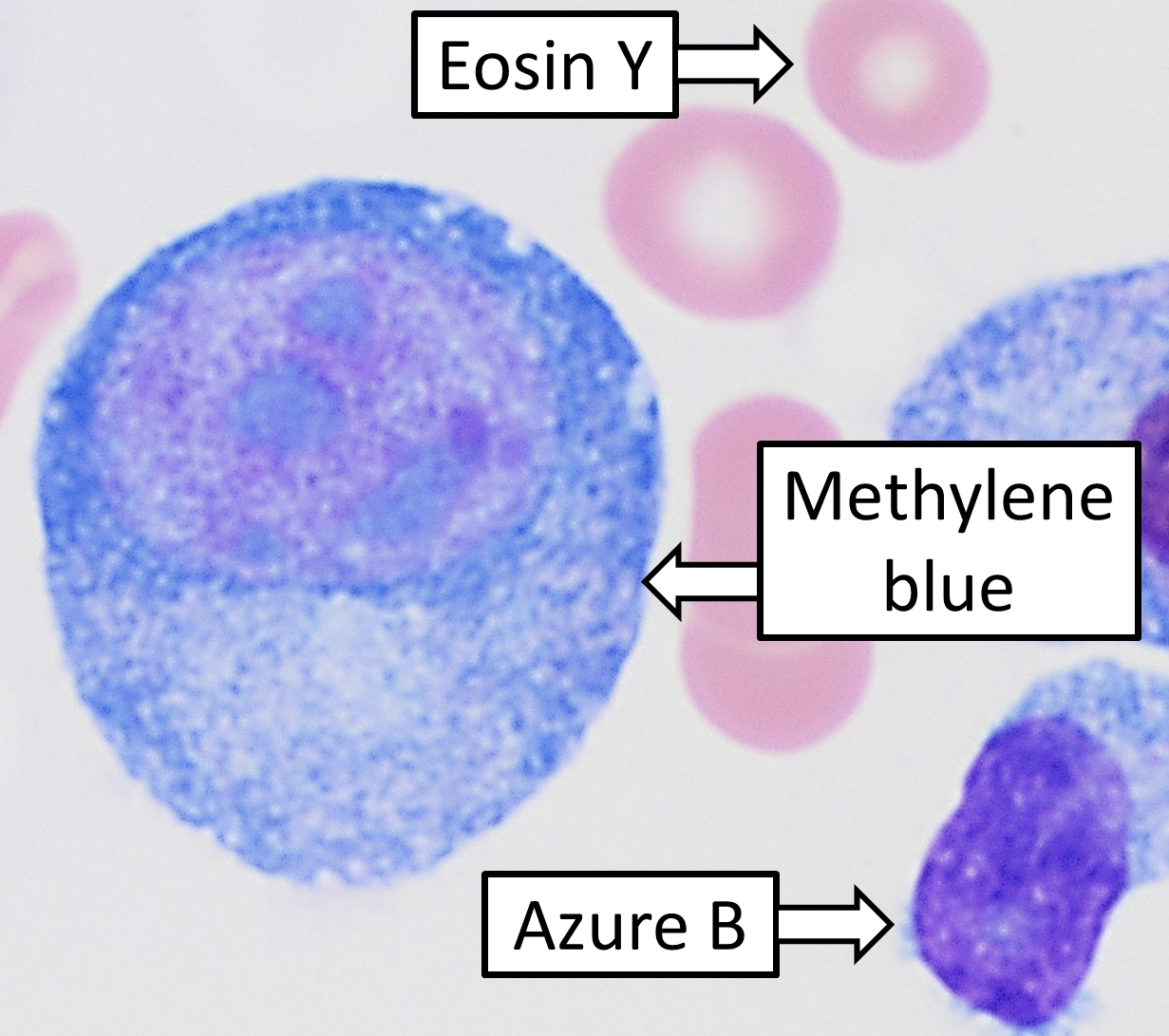
Wright's stain, with red blood cells taking up eosin Y, azure B giving nuclei a purple color, and methylene blue coloring the cytoplasm of this plasmablast.

Wright's stain can be used alone or in combination with the Giemsa stain, which is known as the Wright-Giemsa stain. Wright's stain is named after James Homer Wright who in 1902 published a method using heat to produce polychromed methylene blue, which is combined with eosin Y. The polychromed methylene blue is combined with eosin and allowed to precipitate, forming an eosinate which is redissolved in methanol. The addition of Giemsa to Wright's stain increases the brightness of the "reddish-purple" color of the cytoplasmic granules. The Wright's and Wright-Giemsa stains are two of the Romanowsky-type stains in common use in the United States and are mainly used for the staining of blood and bone marrow films.

=== Jenner stain ===
Jenner's stain is used in microscopy for staining blood smears. The stain is dark blue and results in very observable clearly stained nucleus.

=== Giemsa stain ===
Giemsa stain is composed of "Azure II" and eosin Y with methanol and glycerol as the solvent. "Azure II" is thought to be a mixture of azure B (which Giemsa called "azure I") and methylene blue, although the exact composition of "azure I" is considered a trade secret. Comparable formulations using known dyes have been published and are commercially available. Giemsa stain is considered to be the standard stain for detection and identification of the malaria parasite.

=== May-Grünwald stain ===
The May-Grünwald-Giemsa is used for the staining of slides obtained by fine-needle aspiration in a histopathology lab for the diagnosis of tumorous cells.

=== Pappenheim stain ===
This method is a combination of May-Grünwald and Giemsa staining.

=== Leishman stain ===
In 1901 William Leishman developed a stain that was similar to Louis Jenner's but with the replacement of pure methylene blue with polychromed methylene blue. Leishman's stain is prepared from the eosinate of polychromed methylene blue and eosin Y using methanol as the solvent.

=== Field's stain ===
Field stain is used for staining thick blood films in order to discover malarial parasites.

== Clinical importances ==
=== Blood and bone marrow pathology ===
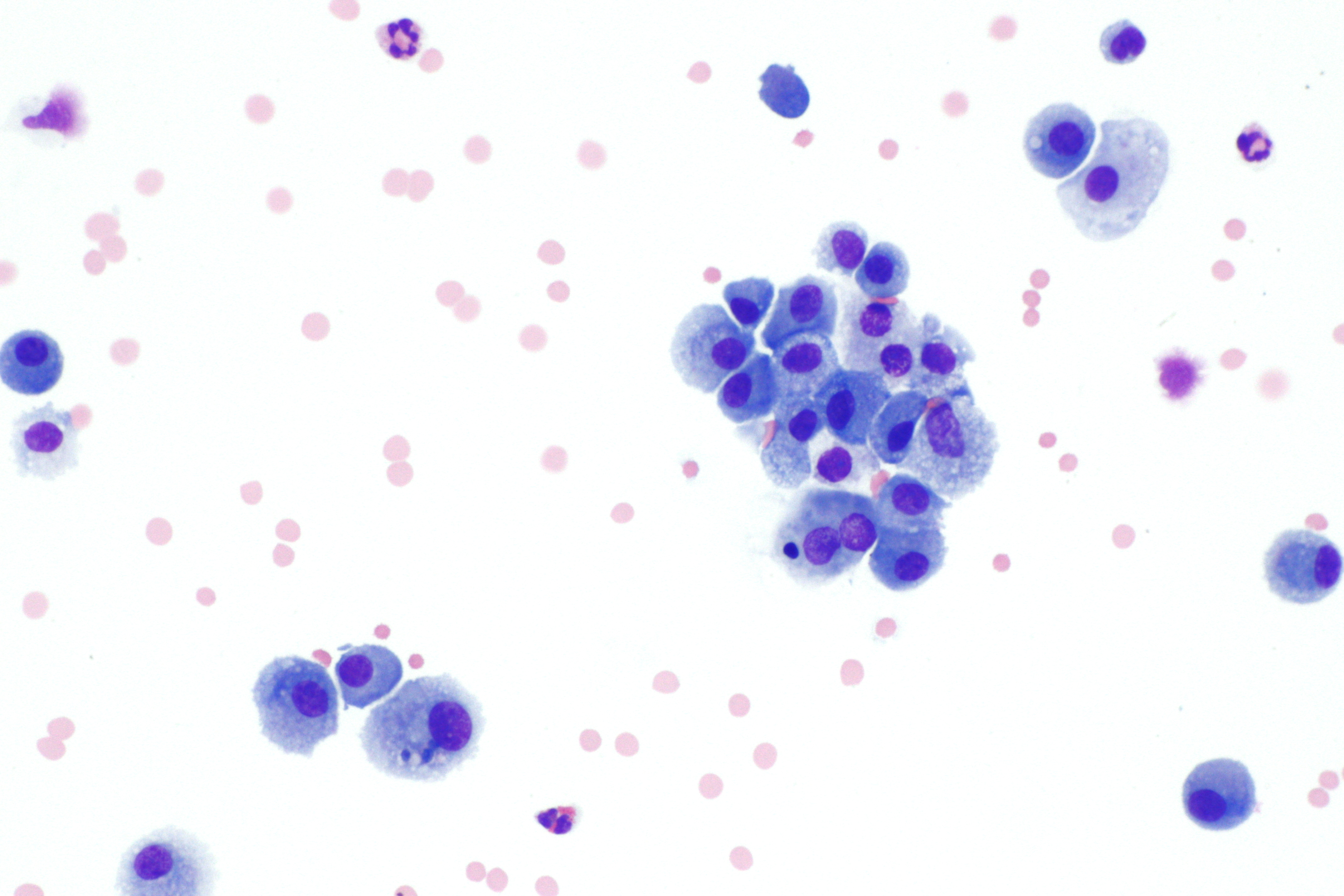
Bronchoalveolar lavage specimen stained with Diff-Quik, a commercial Romanowsky stain variant widely used in cytopathology

Romanowsky-type stains are widely used in the examination of blood, in the form of blood films, and in the microscopic examination of bone marrow biopsies and aspirate smears. Examination of both blood and bone marrow can be of importance in the diagnosis of a variety of blood diseases. In the United States the Wright and Wright-Giemsa variants of the Romanowsky-type stains are widely used, while in Europe Giemsa stain is commonly employed.

=== Detection of malaria and other parasites ===
Of the Romanowsky-type stains, the Giemsa stain is especially important in the detection and identification of malaria parasites in blood samples. Malaria antigen detection tests are an alternative to the staining and microscopic examination of blood films for the detection of malaria.

=== Use in cytopathology ===
Romanowsky-type stains are also used for the staining of cytopathologic specimens such as those produced from fine-needle aspirates and cerebrospinal fluid from lumbar punctures.

== History ==
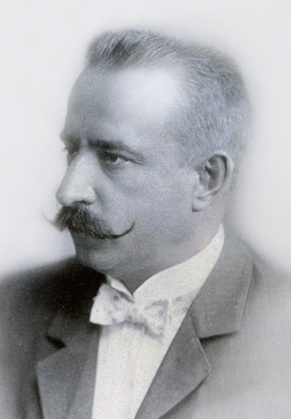
Dmitri Leonidovich Romanowsky (1861-1921)

Although debate exists as to who deserves credit for this general staining method, popular usage has attributed it to Dmitri Leonidovich Romanowsky.

In the 1870s Paul Ehrlich used a mixture of acidic and basic dyes including acid fuchsin (acid dye) and methylene blue (basic dye) to examine blood films. In 1888 Cheslav Ivanovich Chenzinsky used methylene blue, but substituted the acid fuchsin used by Ehrlich with eosin. Chenzinsky's stain combination was able to stain the malaria parasite (a member of the genus Plasmodium). Neither Ehrlich's or Chenzinsky's stains produced the Romanowsky effect as the methylene blue they used was not polychromed.

Dmitri Romanowsky in 1890 published preliminary findings of his blood stain (a combination of aged methylene blue and eosin), including the results when applied to malaria infected blood. This use of polychromed methylene blue differentiated Romanowsky's stain (and the subsequent formulations) from those of Ehrlich and Chenzinsky, which lacked the purple hue associated with the Romanowsky effect. Romanowsky's 1890 publication did not include a description of how he modified his methylene blue solution, but in his 1891 doctoral thesis he described methylene blue best as used after mold began forming on the surface. Other than the use of an aged methylene blue solution, Romanowsky's stain was based on Chenzinsky's stain technique. Romanowsky's use of his method to study the malaria parasite has been attributed to the continued interest in his staining method.

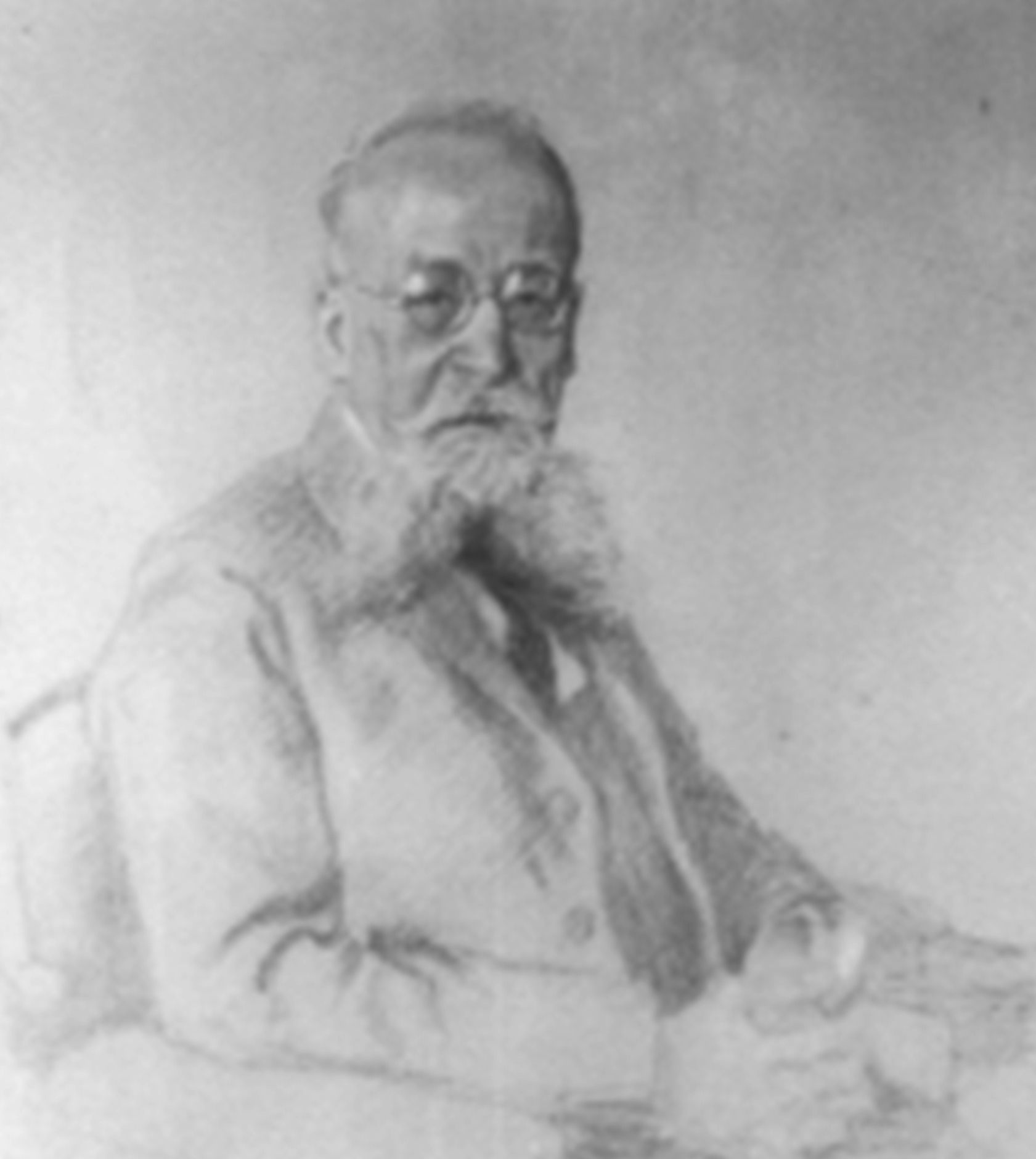
Ernst Malachowsky

Ernst Malachowsky has been credited with independently observing the same stain combination as Dmitri Romanowsky in 1891, although he has also been credited with being the first to do so. Malachowsky was the first to use a deliberately polychromed methylene blue solution, which Malachowsky accomplished by the addition of borax to the staining mixture. Malachowsky is reported to have demonstrated the stain on June 15, 1890, and in the same year to have published a paper "describing his public demonstration". Both the Romanowsky and Malachowsky methods were able to stain the nucleus and cytoplasm of the malaria parasite, when until this point the stains used had only colored the cytoplasm.

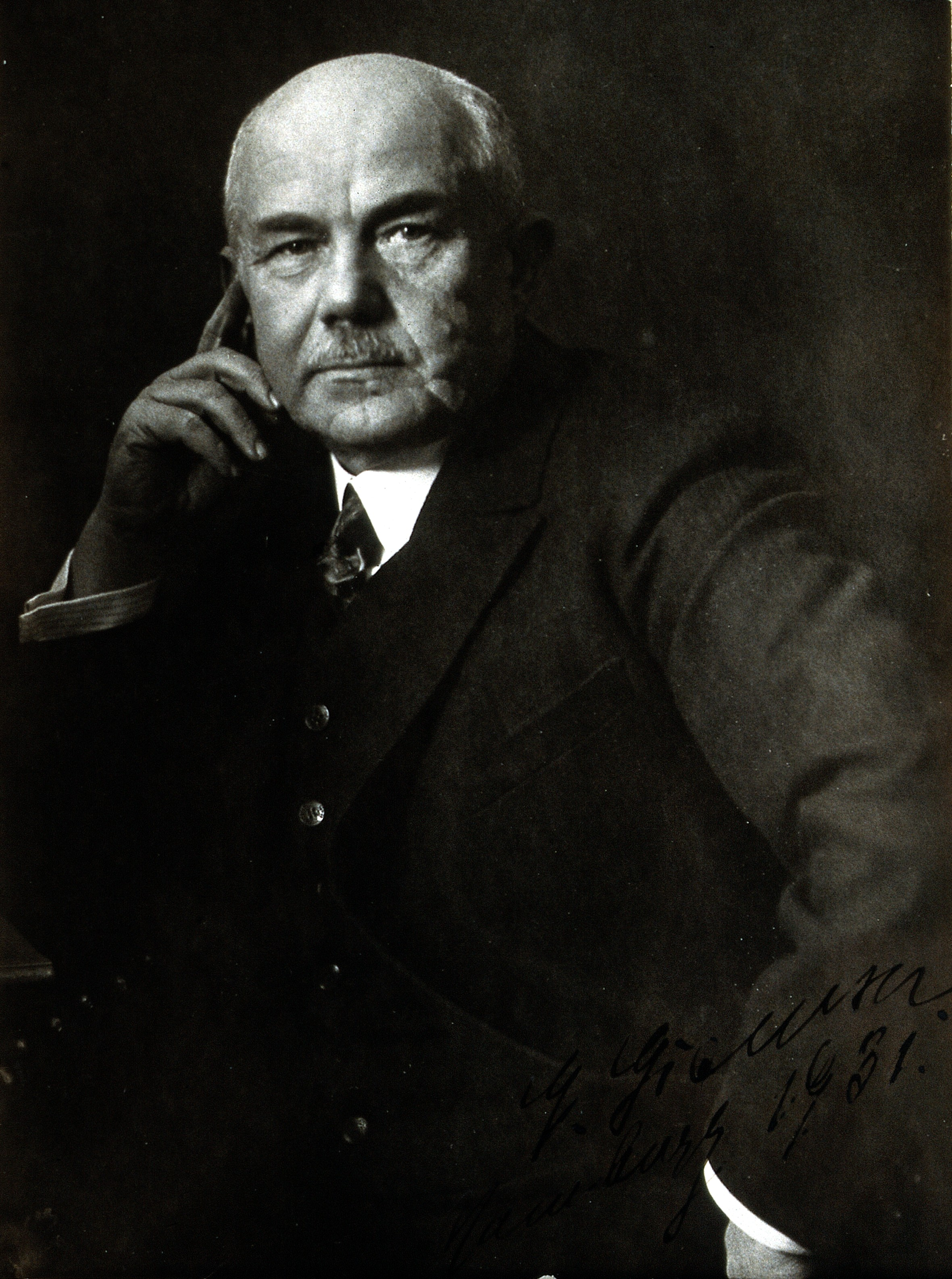
Gustav Giemsa

In 1899, Louis Leopold Jenner developed a more stable version of the methylene blue and eosin stain by collecting the precipitate that forms in water-based mixtures and redissolving it in methanol. Romanowsky-type stains prepared from the collected precipitates are sometimes known as eosinates. Besides increasing the stability of the stain, the use of methanol in Jenner's stain had the effect of fixing the blood samples, although Jenner's version of the stain does not produce the Romanowsky effect.

Richard May and Ludwig Grünwald in 1892 published a version of the stain (now known as the May–Grünwald stain) which is similar to the version proposed by Jenner in 1899, and likewise does not produce the Romanowsky effect.

In 1901, both Karl Reuter and William Leishman developed stains that combined Louis Jenner's use of alcohol as the solvent and Malachowsky's use of polychromed methylene blue. Reuter's stain differed from Jenner's in using ethyl alcohol instead of methanol, and Leishman's differed from Jenner's by using eosin B instead of eosin Y.

James Homer Wright in 1902 published a method using heat to polychrome the methylene blue, which he combined with eosin Y. This technique is known as Wright's stain.

Gustav Giemsa's name has also become associated with the stain as he is credited with publishing a useful formulation and protocol in 1902. Giemsa attempted to use combinations of pure dyes rather than polychromed methylene blue solutions which are highly variable in composition. Giemsa sold the rights to produce his stain, but never fully published details on how he produced it, although it is thought that he used a combination of azure B and methylene blue. Giemsa published a number of modifications of his stains between 1902 and 1934. In 1904 he suggested adding glycerin to his stain, along with the methanol, to increase its stability.

Giemsa stain powders produced in Germany were widely used in the United States until the interruption of the supply during World War I, which caused increased utilization of James Homer Wright's method for polychroming methylene blue.

== See also ==
- Liu's stain
- Malaria antigen detection tests
- Papanicolaou stain
- Staining (biology)
