= Jaswant Singh–Bhattacharji stain =

Rapid staining method for detection of malaria

Jaswant Singh–Bhattacharji stain, commonly referred to as JSB stain, is a rapid staining method for detection of malaria. It is useful for the diagnosis of malaria in thick smear samples of blood. The JSB stain is commonly used throughout India, but rarely used in other countries.

== Composition ==
The JSB stain consists of two solutions which are used in sequence to stain various parts of the sample. The first solution consists of methylene blue, potassium dichromate, and sulfuric acid diluted in water. This solution is heated for several hours to oxidize the methylene blue. The second solution is eosin dissolved in water.

== See also ==
- Giemsa stain
- Wright stain
