= Leishman stain =

Diagnostic technique

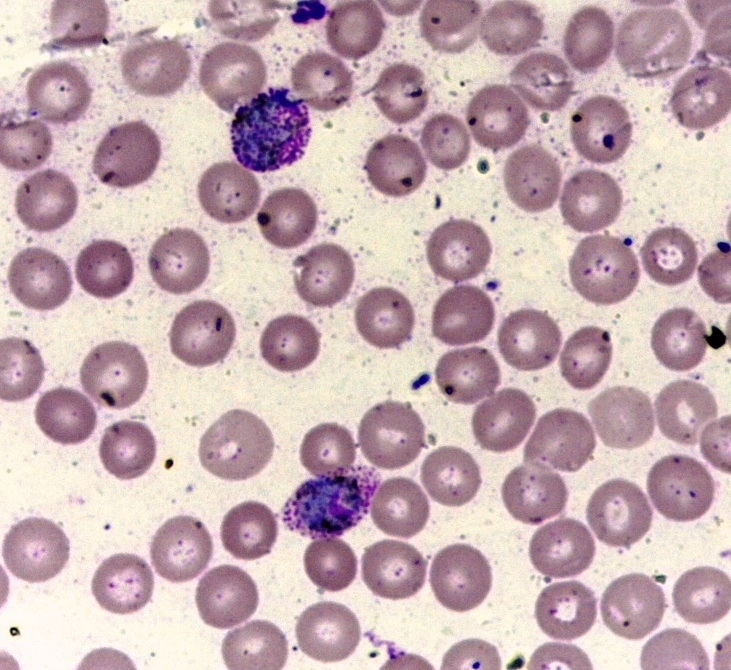
A Leishman stain showing the schizont stage of Plasmodium vivax malaria parasite

Leishman stain, also known as Leishman's stain, is used in microscopy for staining blood smears. It is generally used to differentiate between and identify white blood cells, malaria parasites, and trypanosomas. It is based on a methanolic mixture of "polychromed" methylene blue (i.e. demethylated into various azures) and eosin. The methanolic stock solution is stable and also serves the purpose of directly fixing the smear eliminating a prefixing step. If a working solution is made by dilution with an aqueous buffer, the resulting mixture is very unstable and cannot be used for long. Leishman stain is named after its inventor, the Scottish pathologist William Boog Leishman. It is a version of the Romanowsky stain, and is thus similar to and partially replaceable by Giemsa stain, Jenner's stain, and Wright's stain.

== Preparation and storage ==
Many companies sell Leishman Stain in the form of a dry powder, which is later reconstituted with methanol. Heat and bright light oxidize the stain, and cause the precipitation of insoluble precipitates, such as methylene violet (Bernthsen) or Azure-Eosinate salts.

== Advantages and disadvantages ==
=== Advantages ===
According to Sir John Vivian Dacie's textbook, Practical Haematology, "Amongst the Romanowsky stains now in use, Jenner's is the simplest and Giemsa's the most complex. Leishman's stain, which occupies an intermediate position, is still widely used in the routine staining."

The WHO protocol mentions:

There are a number of different combinations of these dyes which vary in their staining characteristics. May-Grunwald-Giemsa is a good method for routine work. Wright's stain is a simpler method, whilst Leishman's is also a simple method which is especially suitable when a stained blood film is required urgently or the routine stain is not available (e.g. at night). Field's stain is a rapid stain used primarily on thin films for malarial parasites. Whichever method is used, it is important to select dyes that are not contaminated with other dyes or metallic salts.

Sir William Boog Leishman of London and Karl Reuter of Germany independently discovered in 1901 what is considered "Perhaps the most practical modifications of Malachowski’s stain" They adopted the best aspects of the stains developed by Malachowski and Jenner, i.e., they used both polychromed methylene blue (accidentally done by Romanowsky who got the name, systematically done by Ernst Malachowski even before Romanowsky, and rediscovered by Bernhard Nocht, but unknown to Jenner, May, Grunwald and many others who used simple methylene blue) and filtering the Azure Eosinate precipitate from the aqueous mixture and redissolving in an alcoholic solvent (Jenner's wisdom). Differences between Leishman's and Reuter's methods were: Leishman used methanol (like Jenner) and substituted Eosin B for Eosin Y, whereas Reuter used ethyl alcohol and rightly stressed the importance of using an absolutely pure solvent. Both methods produced a stable stain and the desired purple color.

==== Good contrast ====
Leishman stain generally shows the brilliant violet color of the nucleus and the neutrophil granules for which differential count becomes convenient and makes the quality of staining better than the stains that are simple methylene blue and Eosin based which do not produce enough contrast between the cytoplasm and the nucleus. Since Leishman, like other Romanowsky stains, stain cytoplasmic details and granules better, hematologists generally prefer them (however see below about cytologists). Compared to the costly and toxic pure synthetic Azure B and Eosin Y based reagents used by the ICSH reference methods which are also not free from the disadvantage of getting oxidized and eventually giving grey tone instead of the optimal blue colors for cytoplasm, Leishman is a cheap easily available and easy to do technique which gives a fairly acceptable contrast.

==== Good sensitivity for malaria parasite ====
It has been documented that Leishman staining is more sensitive than Field's stain and as good as fluorescent stains for detection of malaria parasite.

=== Disadvantages ===
==== Difficulty controlling molar ratio ====
Composition of polychromed methylene blue mixed with Eosin is never as good as the directly weighed and mixed proportions in Giemsa type stains. Albert Plehn in 1890 had figured out that the molar ratio of basic to acidic dyes had to be increased from 2:1 to 3:1, however from Jenners time (1899) the use of the Azure Eosinate crystals brought the ratio back to the unsatisfactory 2:1 and the depth of color became less. It was only the work by Gustav Giemsa and the likes who again manually controlled the proportion of these two components that brought the depth of staining back. However Giemsa and others who artificially controlled the proportion sometimes went to the other extreme (a large molar excess of Azure up to a ratio of 16.1) which was probably unnecessary. per ICSH the optimal ratio is 6.5 to 7.3.

==== Instability ====
The Leishman stain if reconstituted with buffer becomes very unstable (in contrast with Giemsa which is relatively more stable due to Glycerol, or the ICSH reference stains which use methanol+DMSO in 6:4 v/v ratio) and starts precipitating and needs repeated filtering. If not carefully supervised, water absorption, methanol evaporation from an opened container and the repeated filtering changes the composition and required frequent changing and makes this method wasteful. If not filtered, the precipitate deposits on the smear may be confused with platelets. It is important not to shake the bottle of stain before use, else settled precipitates would be resuspended and will deposit on films during staining and cause numerous artifacts and make microscopy very difficult.

==== Cytoplasmic contrast good but nuclear contrast not as good as H&E ====
Like all other Malachowski-Romanowsky-Giemsa methods, it fades with time and cannot be stably archived for long. Also its above counterparts it stains the nuclei dark purple and the nuclear feature details are not as clear as Hematoxylene and Eosin, which are thus preferred by some cytopathologists. But that way it is a complementary method (since it stains cytoplasmic details granules etc. better than H&E stain).
