= Wright's stain =

Hematologic stain that facilitates the visual differentiation of blood cell types

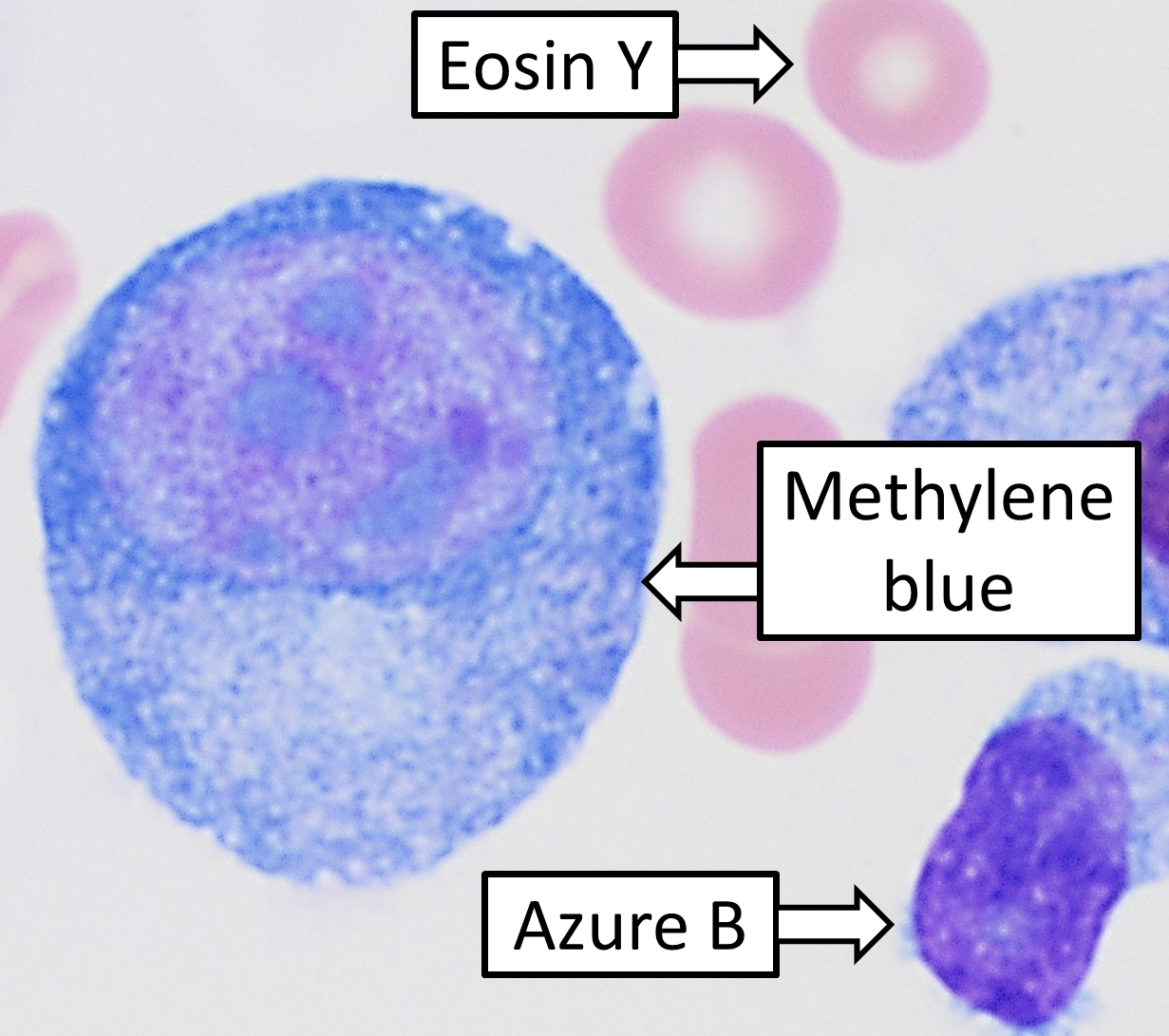
Wright's stain, with red blood cells taking up eosin Y, azure B giving nuclei a purple color, and methylene blue coloring the cytoplasm of this plasmablast.

Wright's stain is a hematologic stain that facilitates the differentiation of blood cell types. It is classically a mixture of eosin (red) and methylene blue dyes. It is used primarily to stain peripheral blood smears, urine samples, and bone marrow aspirates, which are examined under a light microscope. In cytogenetics, it is used to stain chromosomes to facilitate diagnosis of syndromes and diseases.

It is named for James Homer Wright, who devised the stain, a modification of the Romanowsky stain, in 1902. Because it distinguishes easily between blood cells, it became widely used for performing differential white blood cell counts, which are routinely ordered when conditions such as infection or leukemia are suspected.

The related stains are known as the buffered Wright stain, the Wright-Giemsa stain (a combination of Wright and Giemsa stains), and the buffered Wright-Giemsa stain, and specific instructions depend on the solutions being used, which may include eosin Y, azure B, and methylene blue (some commercial preparations combine solutions to simplify staining). The May–Grünwald stain, which produces a more intense coloration, also takes a longer time to perform.

Urine samples stained with Wright's stain will identify eosinophils, which can indicate interstitial nephritis or urinary tract infection.

White blood cells stained with Wright's stain:

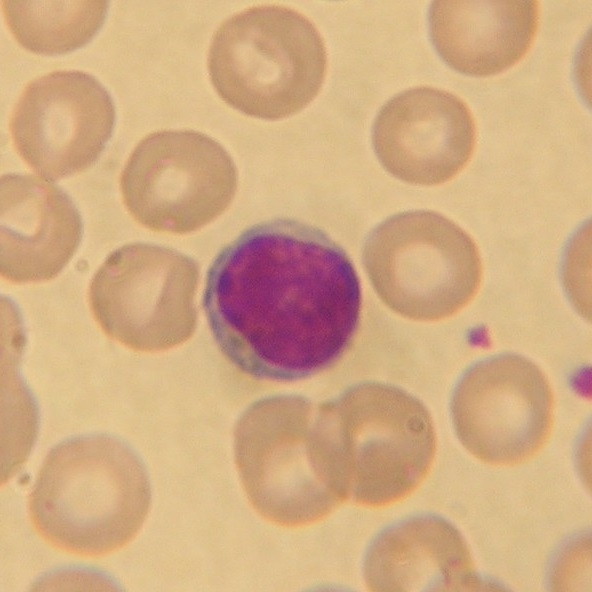
Lymphocyte

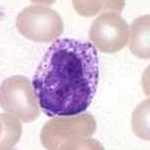
Basophil

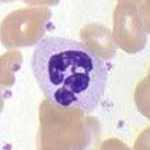
Neutrophil

== See also ==
- Diff-Quik
- Leishman stain
- List of histologic stains that aid in diagnosis of cutaneous conditions
- Romanowsky stain
- Staining (biology)
