= Diff-Quik =

Commercial Romanowsky stain variant

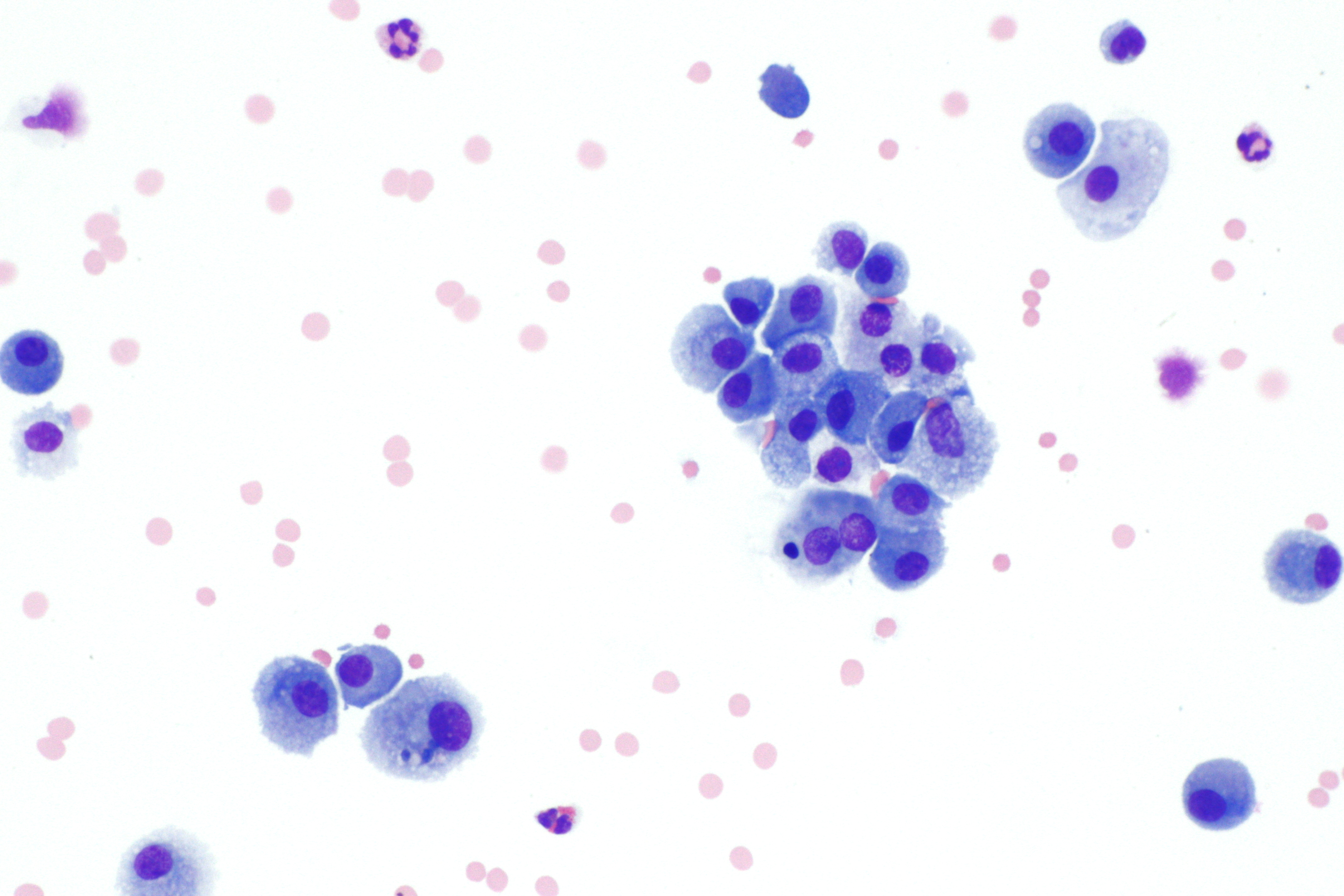
Bronchoalveolar lavage specimen stained with Diff-Quik

Diff-Quik is a commercial Romanowsky stain variant used to rapidly stain and differentiate a variety of pathology specimens. It is most frequently used for blood films and cytopathological smears, including fine needle aspirates. The Diff-Quik procedure is based on a modification of the Wright-Giemsa stain pioneered by Harleco in the 1970s, and has advantages over the routine Wright-Giemsa staining technique in that it reduces the 4-minute process into a much shorter operation and allows for selective increased eosinophilic or basophilic staining depending upon the time the smear is left in the staining solutions.

There are generic brands of such stain, and the trade name is sometimes used loosely to refer to any such stain (much as "Coke" or "Band-Aid" are sometimes used imprecisely).

== Usage ==
Diff-Quik may be utilized on material which is air-dried prior to alcohol fixation rather than immersed immediately (i.e. "wet-fixed"), although immediate alcohol fixation results in improved microscopic detail.

The primary use of Romanowsky-type stains in cytopathology is for cytoplasmic detail, while Papanicolaou stain is used for nuclear detail. Diff-Quik stain highlights cytoplasmic elements such as mucins, fat droplets and neurosecretory granules. Extracellular substances, such as free mucin, colloid, and ground substance, are also easily stained, and appear metachromatic. Major applications include blood smears, bone marrow aspirates, semen analysis and cytology of various body fluids including urine and cerebrospinal fluid. Microbiologic agents, such as bacteria and fungi, also appear more easily in Diff-Quik. This is useful for the detection of for example Helicobacter pylori from gastric and pyloric specimens.

Due to its short staining time, Diff-Quik stain is often used for initial screening of cytopathology specimens. This staining technique allows the cytotechnologist or pathologist to quickly assess the adequacy of the specimen, identify possible neoplastic or inflammatory changes, and decide whether or not additional staining is required.

== Components ==
The Diff-Quik stain consists of 3 solutions:

- Diff-Quik fixative reagent
  - Triarylmethane dye
  - Methanol
- Diff-Quik solution I (eosinophilic)
  - Xanthene dye (Eosin Y)
  - pH buffer
- Diff-Quik solution II (basophilic thiazine dyes)
  - Methylene blue
  - Azure A
  - pH buffer

== Results ==
Structure	Colour
Erythrocytes	Pink/yellowish red
Platelets	Violet/purple granules
Neutrophils	Blue nucleus, pink cytoplasm, violet granules
Eosinophils	Blue nucleus, blue cytoplasm, red granules
Basophils	Purple/dark blue nucleus, violet granules
Monocyte	Violet nucleus, light blue cytoplasm
Bacteria and fungi	Dark blue
Cytoplasm, collagen and muscle	Various shades of pink, orange, yellow and blue
Spermatozoa	Light blue acrosomal region, dark blue post-acrosomal region

== Alternatives ==
- Wright Giemsa stain
- Papanicolaou stain
