= Dmitri Leonidovich Romanowsky =

Russian physician

- Дмитрий Леонидович Романовский
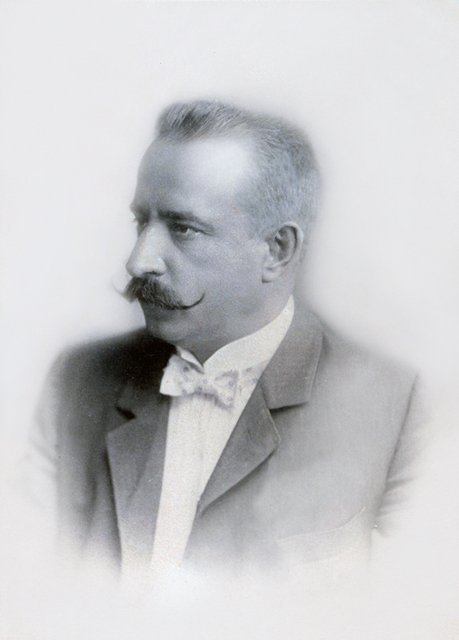
- Born: 1861; Pskov Governorate, Russia
- Died: 1921 (aged 59–60); Kislovodsk
- Education: St. Petersburg University
- Known for: Romanowsky stain
- Scientific career
- Fields: Medicine; Histochemistry
- Workplaces: Ivangorod military hospital Revel local infirmary Saint Petersburg Nikolaevsky military hospital
- Thesis: On the question of parasitology and therapy of malaria (1891)

Dmitri Leonidovich Romanowsky (sometimes spelled Dmitry and Romanowski, Russian: Дмитрий Леонидович Романовский; 1861–1921) was a Russian physician who is best known for his invention of an eponymous histological stain called Romanowsky stain. It paved the way for the discovery and diagnosis of microscopic pathogens, such as malarial parasites, and later developments of new histological stains that became fundamental to microbiology and physiology.

While working on his doctoral research, Romanowsky developed the first effective staining method for malarial parasite in 1890. Using a specific mixture of mouldy methylene blue and eosin, he found that malarial parasites could be distinctively identified from other blood cell and within the red blood cells. The chemical reaction of such staining is known in chemistry as "Romanowsky effect". The method became the gold standard in malaria detection by microscopy and general immunohistochemistry. British zoologist and science historian, Francis Edmund Gabriel Cox remarked the discovery as a serendipitous case that became "one of the most significant technical advances in the history of parasitology."

== Biography ==
Romanowsky was born in 1861 in Pskov Governorate, Russia. He attended the 6th Saint Petersburg Gymnasium. In 1880, he enrolled at the St. Petersburg University. He enrolled for two courses: natural science (physics and mathematics) and medicine. He concentrated on medicine in 1882 for a preparatory course to the Military Medical Academy. He graduated with honors in 1886. On 30 November 1886, he was appointed as a junior resident of the Ivangorod military hospital. After one month, he was transferred to the Revel local infirmary as an associate doctor. In 1889, he was attached to the Saint Petersburg Nikolaevsky Military hospital. He initially worked at the clinical department, and from May 1890, he was the head of the eye department. He obtained his medical degree in 1891 on the thesis "On the question of parasitology and therapy of malaria."

Romanowsky died in 1921 in Kislovodsk in North Caucasus.

== Invention of histological stain ==
=== Background ===
Romanowsky's research for his medical degree in 1880s was mainly on the identification of malarial parasite (Plasmodium). Until that time malarial infection was difficult to confirm as the parasites were hard to distinguish from blood cells or cell organelles. Pigmented blood cells were often linked to malarial infection, but the pigments are not always visible. When French physician Charles Louis Alphonse Laveran discovered and described the malarial protozoan (later called Plasmodium falciparum) in 1880, it was not accepted as no protozoan had ever been seen in blood cells or associated with malaria.

In 1871, German chemist Adolf von Baeyer synthesised a red dye called eosin (Greek word for "morning red"), which in 1876 was found to be useful for staining tissues. Another German chemist Heinrich Caro synthesised a blue dye named methylene blue in 1876, which was first used as a cell stain by Robert Koch. In 1882, using methylene blue Koch discovered the causative bacterium of tuberculosis, tubercle bacillus (now Mycobacterium tuberculosis). The two stains remain among the fundamental stains used in general cell and tissue staining, as well as in clinical diagnosis.

=== Romanowsky stain ===
Romanowsky was the first to realise the differences in the staining abilities of eosin and methylene blue. The individual stains (monochromatic staining) were good only for general colouring of tissue or cell, but not for contrasting the different components. By mixing specific amount of eosin and methylene blue, Romanowsky found that the mixture gave images of contrasting clarity that helped to visualise different parts and components of cells. This mixture method, polychromatic staining or polychromy, with various modifications became the most efficient way of staining cells for identifying cellular components. The chemical phenomenon by which a mixture of stains produces vibrant cell images is known as "Romanowsky effect".

In December 1890, Romanowsky published his invention as a preliminary report of his major work for his doctoral thesis in the journal Vrach as "On the question of the structure of malaria parasites" (as translated in English). Incorrectly, it is more often recorded in books and journals that Romanowsky published his findings in 1891, which led to a controversy on priority that Ernst Malachowsky independently developed the technique as the latter published his research in August 1891.

Romanowsky discovered that instead of fresh methylene blue, an aged and mouldy solution gave the best result, while eosin should be free of any contamination. He described:

For staining [blood sample having malarial infection] the following mixture is used, as discovered by me, which is best when freshly prepared: 2 volumes of a filtered saturated aqueous solution of methylene blue plus 5 volumes of a 1% aqueous eosin solution... In my preparations I always obtain the following picture. Red cells are stained in a pink color. Cytoplasm in eosinophils is saturated-pink, whilst that in the malaria parasite and lymphocytes is light blue. Blood platelets and the nuclei of white cell are dark-violet, whilst the nuclei of malaria parasites are purple-violet. The cytoplasm of leukocytes is pale-violet, with transitional colors between the light blue protoplasm of lymphocytes to violet leukocytes. Within red cells the malaria parasite may be hardly noticeable or may occupy the whole cell. In any event, the violet nucleus, surrounded by a colorless rim, is always clearly distinguishable.

Romanowsky gave an elaborate description of the new technique in his thesis submitted in June 1891. The staining method remains the "gold standard" for visualising blood samples, especially for malarial infection, and in immunohistochemical studies.
