= Liu's stain =

Staining technique for blood smear and cytological smear

Liu's stain (劉氏染色法) is a staining technique used to stain animal cells. It is an improved staining based on Romanowsky stain, and was introduced by professor Chen-Hui Liu (劉禎輝), faculty of National Taiwan University, in 1953. The method sees a wide variety of usage in Taiwan. Comparing to other staining methods, Liu's stain is relatively fast, taking no more than 3 minutes to complete the process. In pathology, Liu's stain is primarily used to distinguish blood cells, but it can also apply on vaginal discharge, sputum, and pus as a simple stain.

== Components ==
Liu's stain is composed of two dyes, Liu A and Liu B. Liu A is the anionic dye, contains, eosin Y to stain cytoplasm as well as hemoglobin into red. Liu B, on the other hand, is the cationic dye, contains azur I and methylene azure, to stain nucleus and basophilic granules into blue. To apply the stain on a fixed smear, first add Liu A for some 45 seconds, then add Liu B for some 90 seconds. Then, wash off the excessive dye by gently flushing the back of the smear. The staining is done after the water on the smear dried up.

Component of Liu's stain
Dye	Ingredients				
Liu A	Eosin Y	Methanol or Ethanol (for fixation)	Methylene azure (trace amount)		
Liu B	Azur I	Methylene azure	Disodium phosphate	Monopotassium phosphate	Water

== See also ==
- Romanowsky stain
