= Field stain =

Method for staining of blood smears

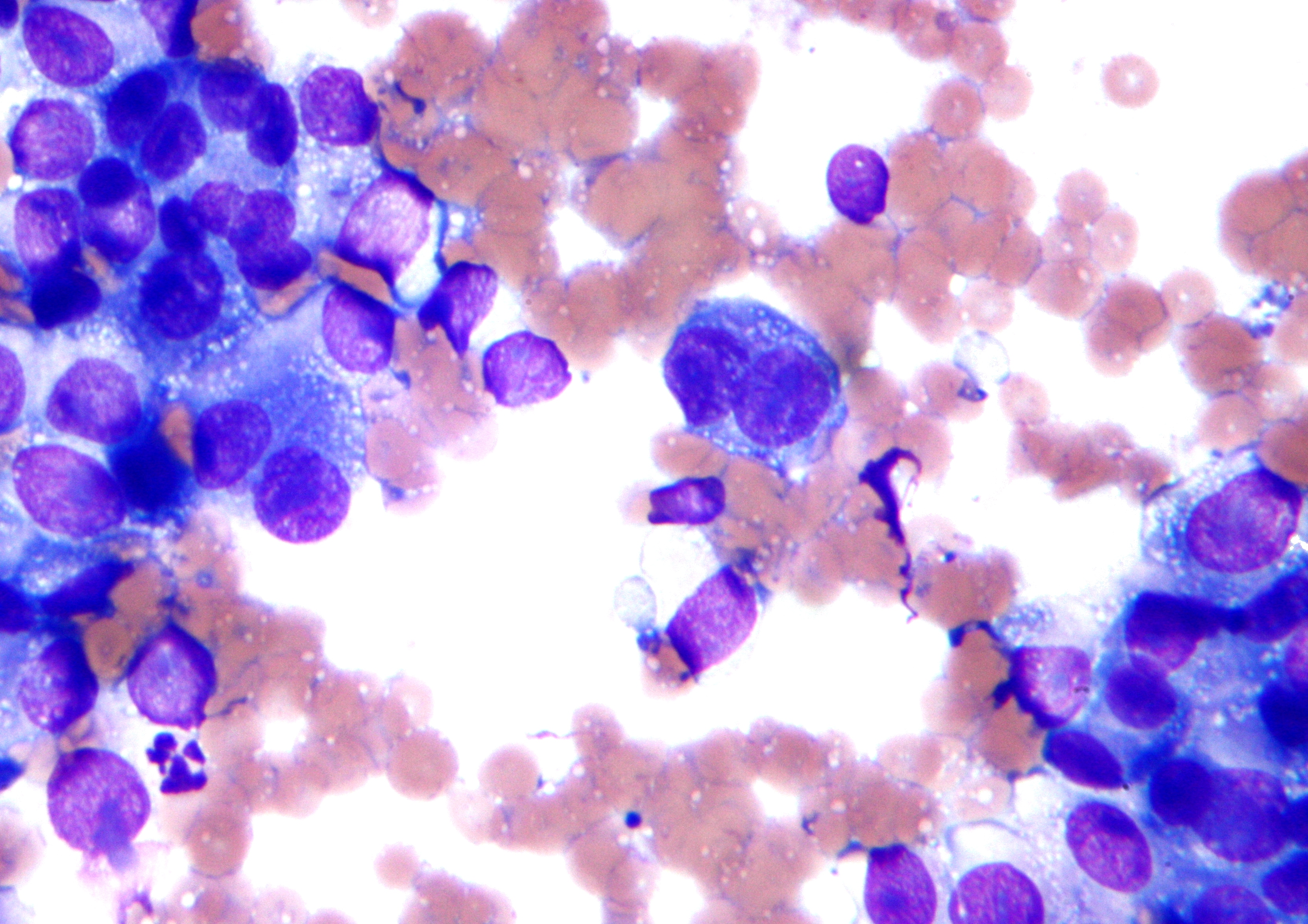
Micrograph of a Field stain showing melanoma.

Field stain is a histological method for staining of blood smears. It is used for staining thick blood films in order to discover malarial parasites. Field's stain is a version of a Romanowsky stain, used for rapid processing of the specimens.

Field's stain consists of two parts - Field's stain A is methylene blue and Azure 1 dissolved in phosphate buffer solution; Field's stain B is Eosin Y in buffer solution. Field stain is named after physician John William Field, who developed it in 1941.

== Additional images ==
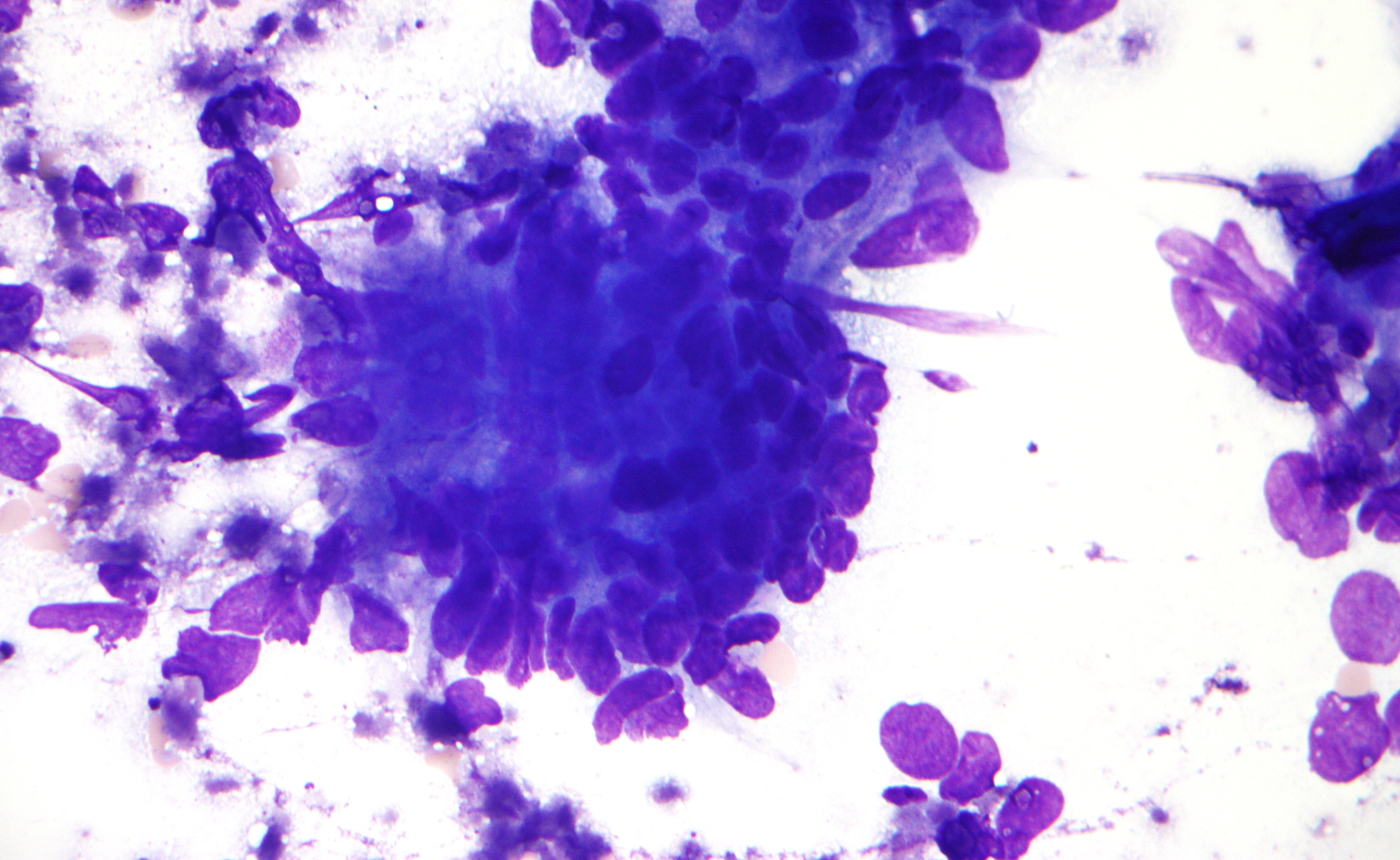
Colorectal adenocarcinoma. Field stain.

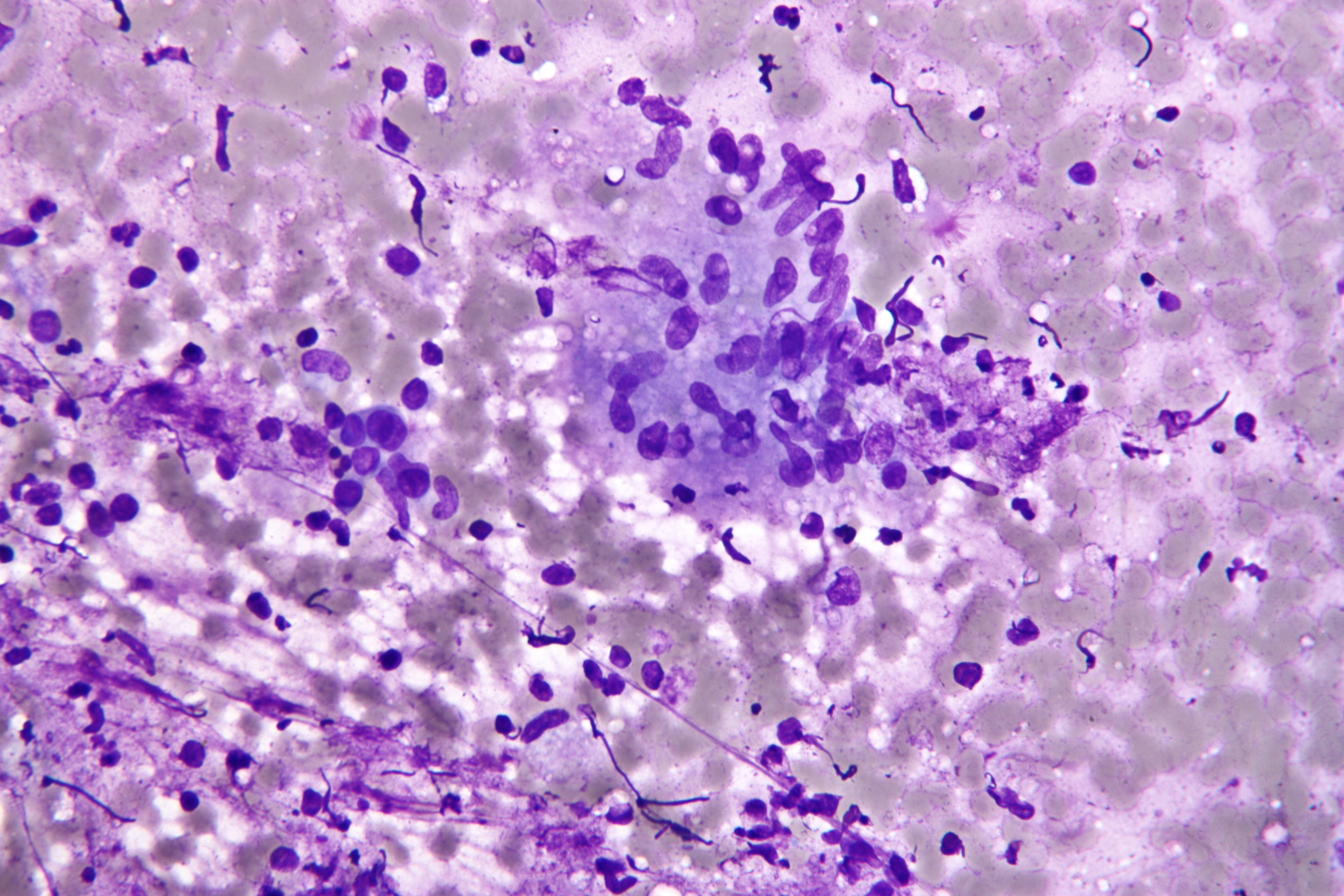
Granuloma. Field stain.
