= William Boog Leishman =

Scottish pathologist and medical officer (1865–1926)

Lieutenant-General Sir William Boog Leishman KCB KCMG FRS FRCP
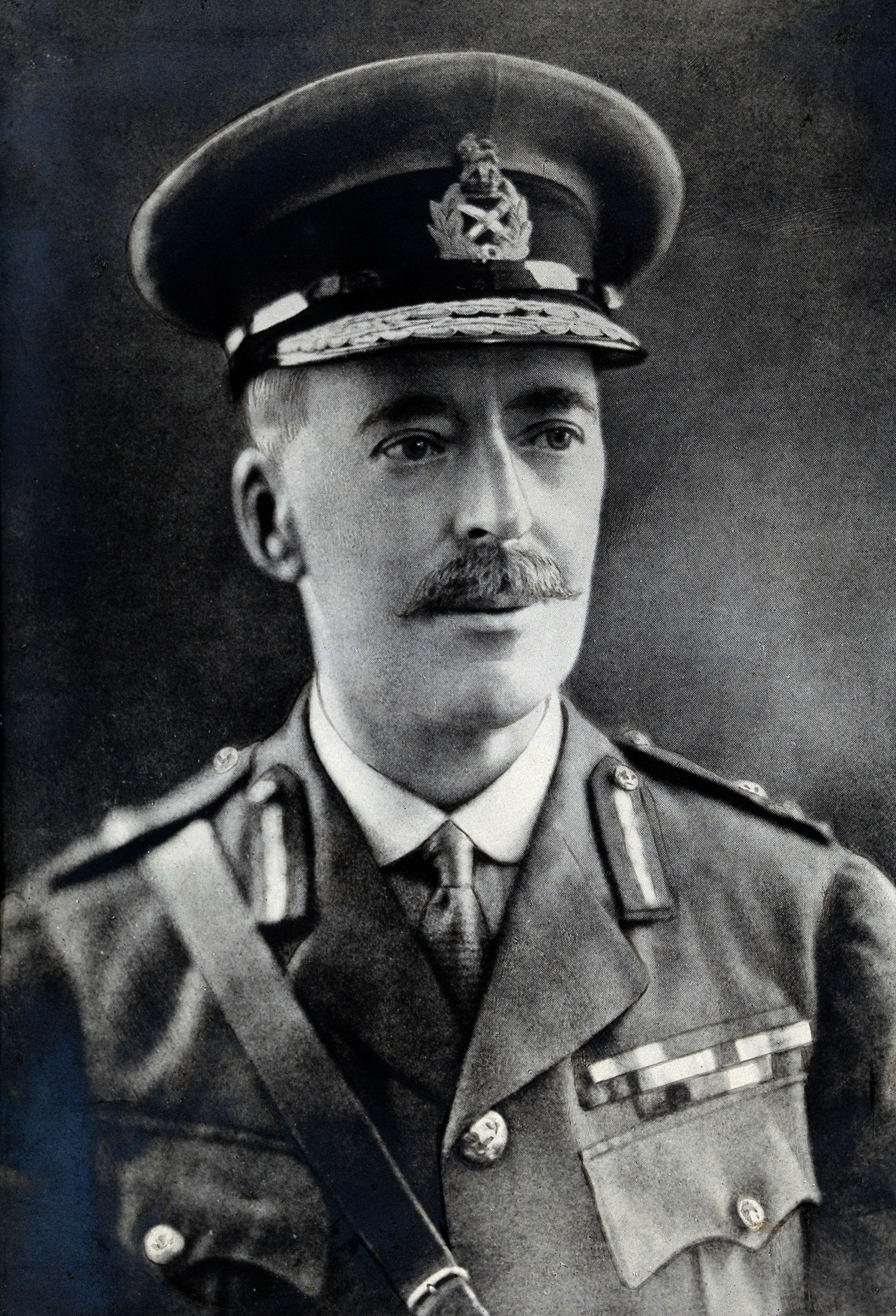
- Born: 6 November 1865; Glasgow, Scotland
- Died: 2 June 1926 (aged 60); London, England
- Burial place: Highgate Cemetery
- Military career
- Allegiance: United Kingdom
- Branch: British Army
- Service years: 1887–1926
- Rank: Lieutenant-General
- Commands: Director General Army Medical Services
- Conflicts: North-West Frontier; First World War
- Awards: Knight Commander of the Order of the Bath; Knight Commander of the Order of St Michael and St George; Knight Bachelor; Mentioned in Despatches (3); Legion of Honour (France); Army Distinguished Service Medal (United States)

Lieutenant-General Sir William Boog Leishman, KCB, KCMG, FRS, FRCP (/ˈliːʃmən/ LEESH-mən; 6 November 1865 – 2 June 1926) was a Scottish pathologist and British Army medical officer. He was Director-General of Army Medical Services from 1923 to 1926.

== Biography ==
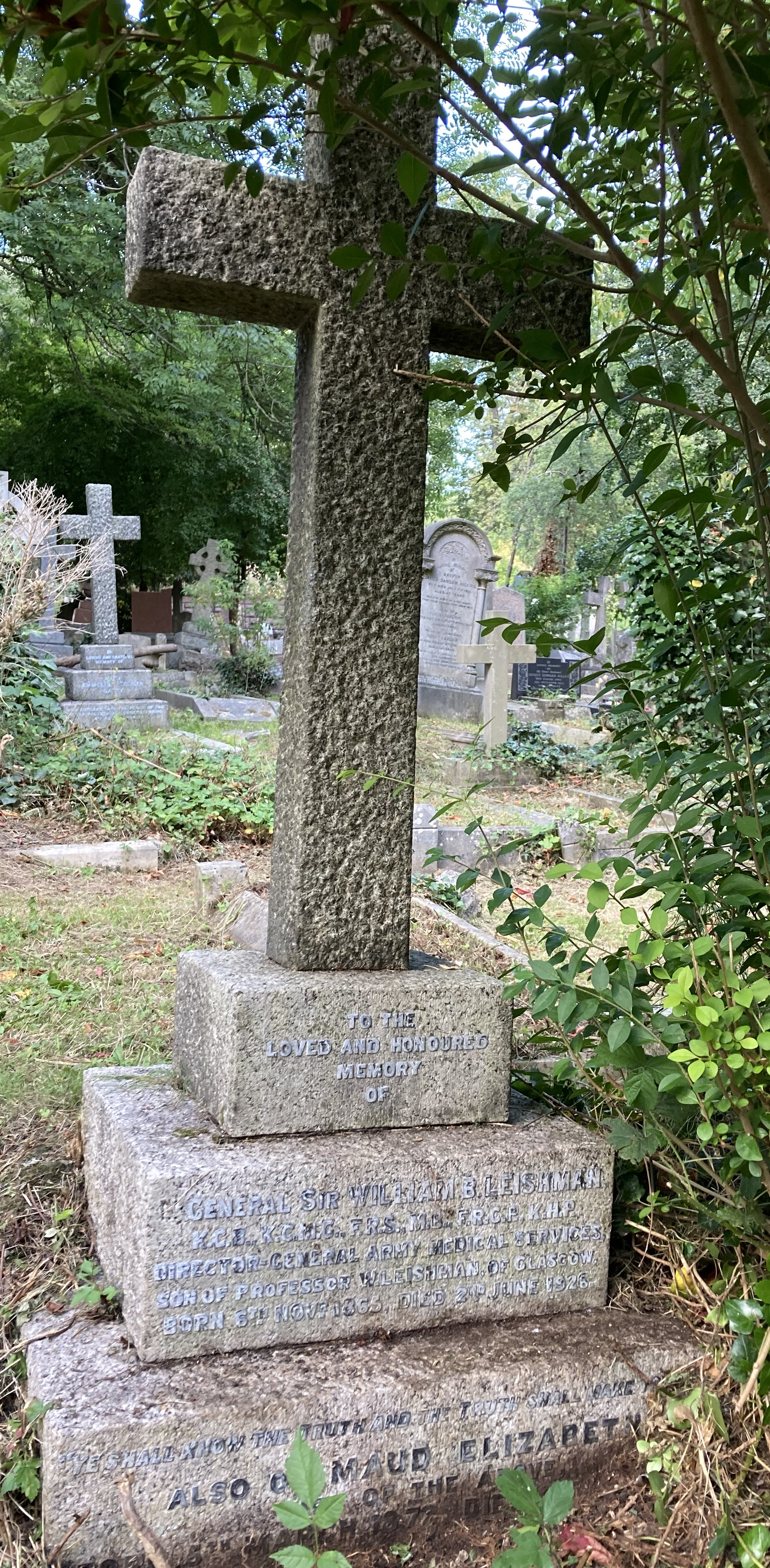
Grave of Sir William Leishman in Highgate Cemetery

Leishman was born in Glasgow and attended Westminster School and the University of Glasgow and entered the Royal Army Medical Corps. He served in India, where he did research on enteric fever and kala-azar. He returned to the United Kingdom and was stationed at the Victoria Hospital in Netley in 1897. In 1900 he was made assistant professor of pathology in the Army Medical School, and described a method of staining blood for malaria and other parasites—a modification and simplification of the existing Romanowsky method using a compound of methylene blue and eosin, which became known as Leishman's stain.

In 1901, while examining pathologic specimens of a spleen from a patient who had died of kala azar (now called "visceral leishmaniasis"), he observed oval bodies and published his account of them in 1903. Charles Donovan of the Indian Medical Service independently found such bodies in other kala azar patients, and they are now known as Leishman–Donovan bodies (not to be confused with Donovan bodies, which are found in Granuloma inguinale, which is caused by Klebsiella granulomatis) and recognized as the protozoan that causes kala azar, Leishmania donovani.

Leishman's name was engraved into the history of parasitology by Sir Ronald Ross, who was impressed by Leishman's work and classified the etiologic agent of kala azar into the separate genus Leishmania. The parasitic organisms from this genus were described earlier by Peter Borovsky in 1892.

Leishman also helped elucidate the life cycle of Spirochaeta duttoni, which causes African tick fever, and, with Almroth Wright, helped develop an effective anti-typhoid inoculation.

He was president of the Royal Society of Tropical Medicine and Hygiene in 1911–1912 and Director General of the Army Medical Services from 1923 to 1926. He was promoted to lieutenant general in July 1923.

He is buried on the eastern side of Highgate Cemetery.

== Recognition ==
Leishman's name features on the frieze of the London School of Hygiene & Tropical Medicine. Twenty-three names of public health and tropical medicine pioneers were chosen to feature on the School building in Keppel Street when it was constructed in 1926.

A memorial fund was instituted by subscriptions raised in memory of him and the Leishman Memorial Prize is now awarded annually for work in any branch of medicine, surgery, allied sciences or general duties of the RAMC or RADC.

== See also ==
- Leishman stain, a solution used for staining blood smears
- Leishmaniasis, a disease
- Romanowsky stain
