= James Homer Wright =

American pathologist

- Born: April 8, 1869; Pittsburgh, Pennsylvania
- Died: January 3, 1928 (aged 58)
- Known for: neuroblastoma
- Scientific career
- Fields: pathologist
- Workplaces: Massachusetts General Hospital

James Homer Wright (April 8, 1869 – January 3, 1928) was an early and influential American pathologist, who was chief of pathology at Massachusetts General Hospital from 1896 to 1926. Wright was born in Pittsburgh, Pennsylvania.

In 1915, he joined with Richard C. Cabot to begin publication of the Case Records of the Massachusetts General Hospital. These began regular publication as the Boston Medical and Surgical Journal which later became the New England Journal of Medicine.

In 1924, Wright, along with Frank B. Mallory, published Pathological Technique: A Practical Manual for the Pathological Laboratory. The book saw eight editions and for many years was the standard textbook in the field.

He is the Wright in Wright's stain, and the Homer Wright rosettes associated with neuroblastoma.

== See also ==
- Romanowsky stain
