= Gustav Giemsa =

German scientist (1867–1948)

Coordinates: 53°32′49″N 9°57′54″E

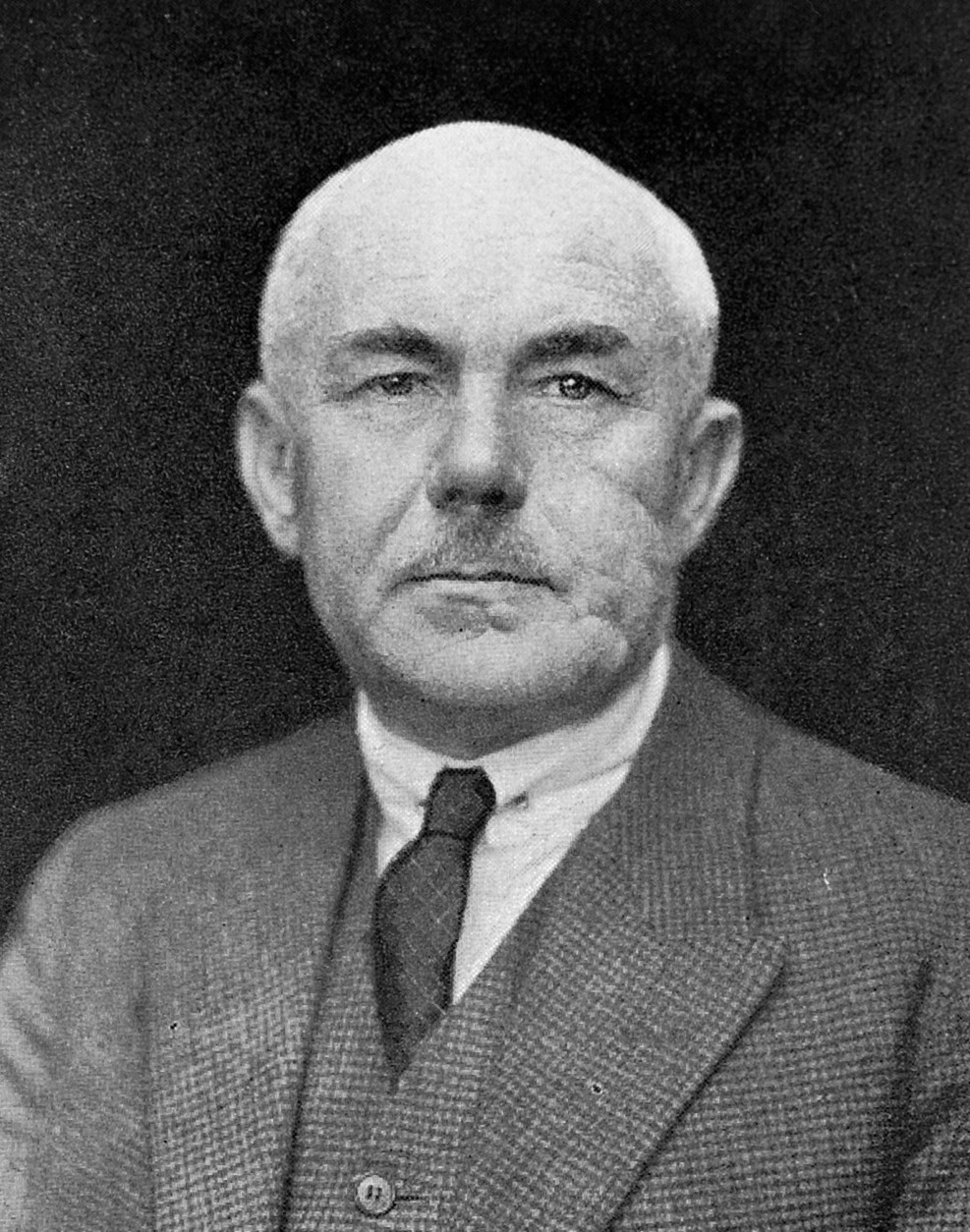
Gustav Giemsa

Berthold Carl Gustav Giemsa (German: [ˈɡiːmzaː]; November 20, 1867 – June 10, 1948) was a German chemist and bacteriologist who was a native of Medar-Blechhammer (now part of the city Kędzierzyn-Koźle). He is best known for creating a dye solution commonly known as "Giemsa stain" which is used in staining for use in the histopathological diagnosis of malaria and parasites such as Plasmodium, Trypanosoma, and Chlamydia.

== Life and work ==
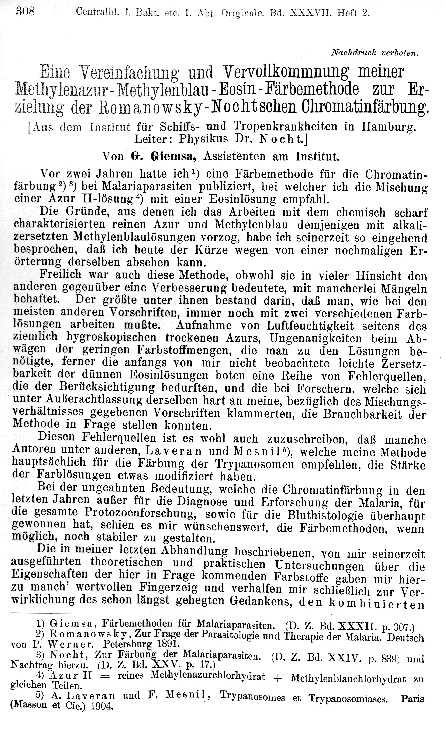
The most influential 1904 work

Giemsa was born in Blechhammer (now Blachownia Śląska, a district within the city of Kędzierzyn-Koźle) to Gustav, a mining official and Franziska. He studied pharmacy and mineralogy at the University of Leipzig (1892–94), and then worked between 1895 and 1898 as a pharmacist at the government hospital in Dar es Salaam, German East Africa. He returned in 1898 and studied chemistry and bacteriology at the University of Berlin and then became an assistant to Bernhard Nocht at the Institut für Tropenmedizin in Hamburg, and in 1900 became head of the Department of Chemistry.

In 1904 Giemsa published an essay on the staining procedure for flagellates, blood cells, and bacteria. Giemsa improved the Romanowsky stain (Eosin Y and Methylene Blue) by stabilizing this dye solution with glycerol. This allowed for reproducible staining of cells for microscopy purposes. This method made rapid malaria screening feasible and is still used in laboratories today.

In 1933 Giemsa signed the Vow of allegiance of the Professors of the German Universities and High-Schools to Adolf Hitler and the National Socialistic State. He also joined the NSDAP.

== Other sources ==
- Ernst Klee: Das Personenlexikon zum Dritten Reich. Wer war was vor und nach 1945. Fischer Taschenbuch Verlag, Zweite aktualisierte Auflage, Frankfurt am Main 2005, S. 182.
- Fleischer B. Editorial: 100 years ago: Giemsa's solution for staining of plasmodia. Trop Med Int Health. 2004 Jul;9(7):755-6.
