= Giemsa stain =

Stain used for diagnosis of malaria

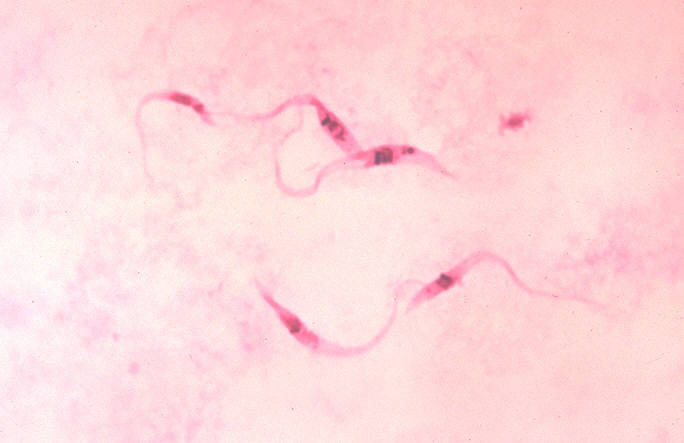
Giemsa stained Trypanosoma parasites (Chagas disease pathogen)

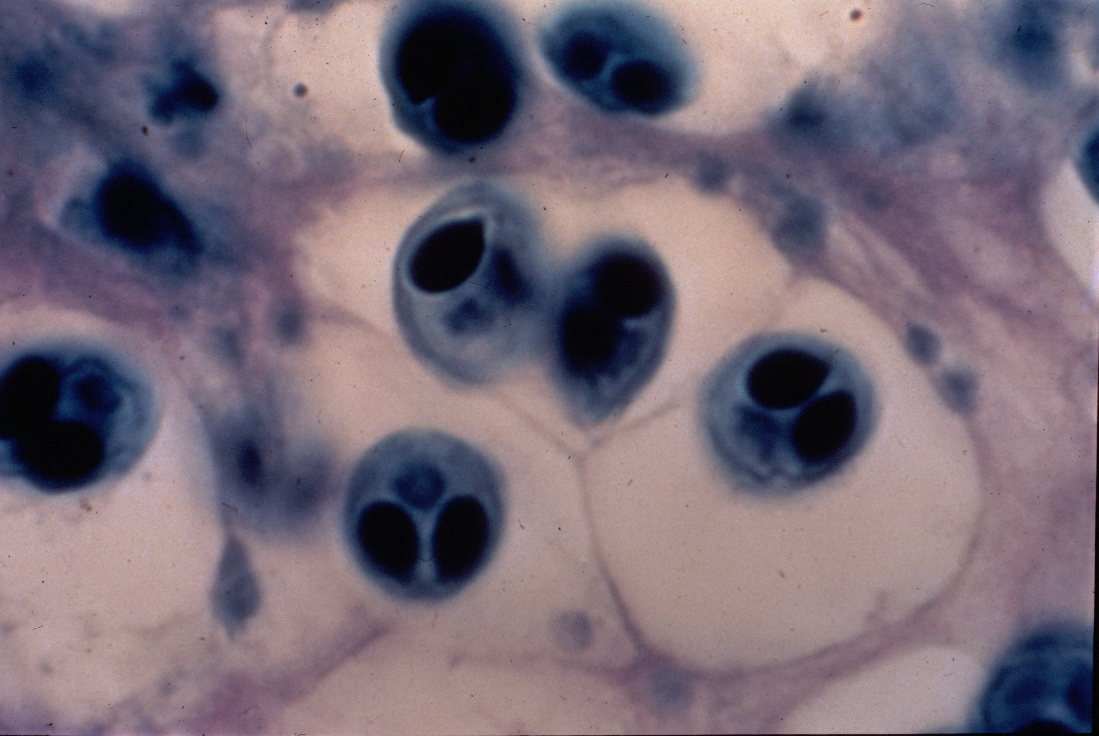
Whirling disease section stained with Giemsa stain

Giemsa stain (/ˈɡiːmzə/), named after German chemist and bacteriologist Gustav Giemsa, is a nucleic acid stain used in cytogenetics and for the histopathological diagnosis of malaria and other parasites.

== Uses ==
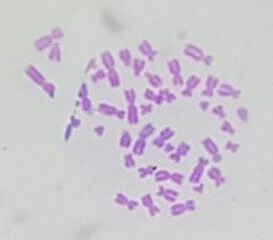
Karyotyping of human male chromosomes using Giemsa staining

It is specific for the phosphate groups of DNA and attaches itself to regions of DNA where there are high amounts of adenine-thymine bonding. Giemsa stain is used in Giemsa banding, commonly called G-banding, to stain chromosomes and often used to create a karyogram (chromosome map). It can identify chromosomal aberrations such as translocations and rearrangements.

It stains the trophozoite Trichomonas vaginalis, the parasite responsible for the sexually transmitted disease trichomoniasis, which presents with greenish discharge and motile cells on wet prep.

Giemsa stain is also a differential stain, such as when it is combined with Wright stain to form Wright–Giemsa stain. It can be used to study the adherence of pathogenic bacteria to human cells. It differentially stains human and bacterial cells purple and pink respectively. It can be used for histopathological diagnosis of the Plasmodium species that cause malaria and some other spirochete and protozoan blood parasites. It is also used to stain Wolbachia cells in host tissue.

Giemsa stain is a classic blood film stain for peripheral blood smears and bone marrow specimens. Erythrocytes stain pink, platelets show a light pale pink, lymphocyte cytoplasm stains sky blue, monocyte cytoplasm stains pale blue, and leukocyte nuclear chromatin stains magenta. It is also used to visualize the classic "safety pin" shape in Yersinia pestis.

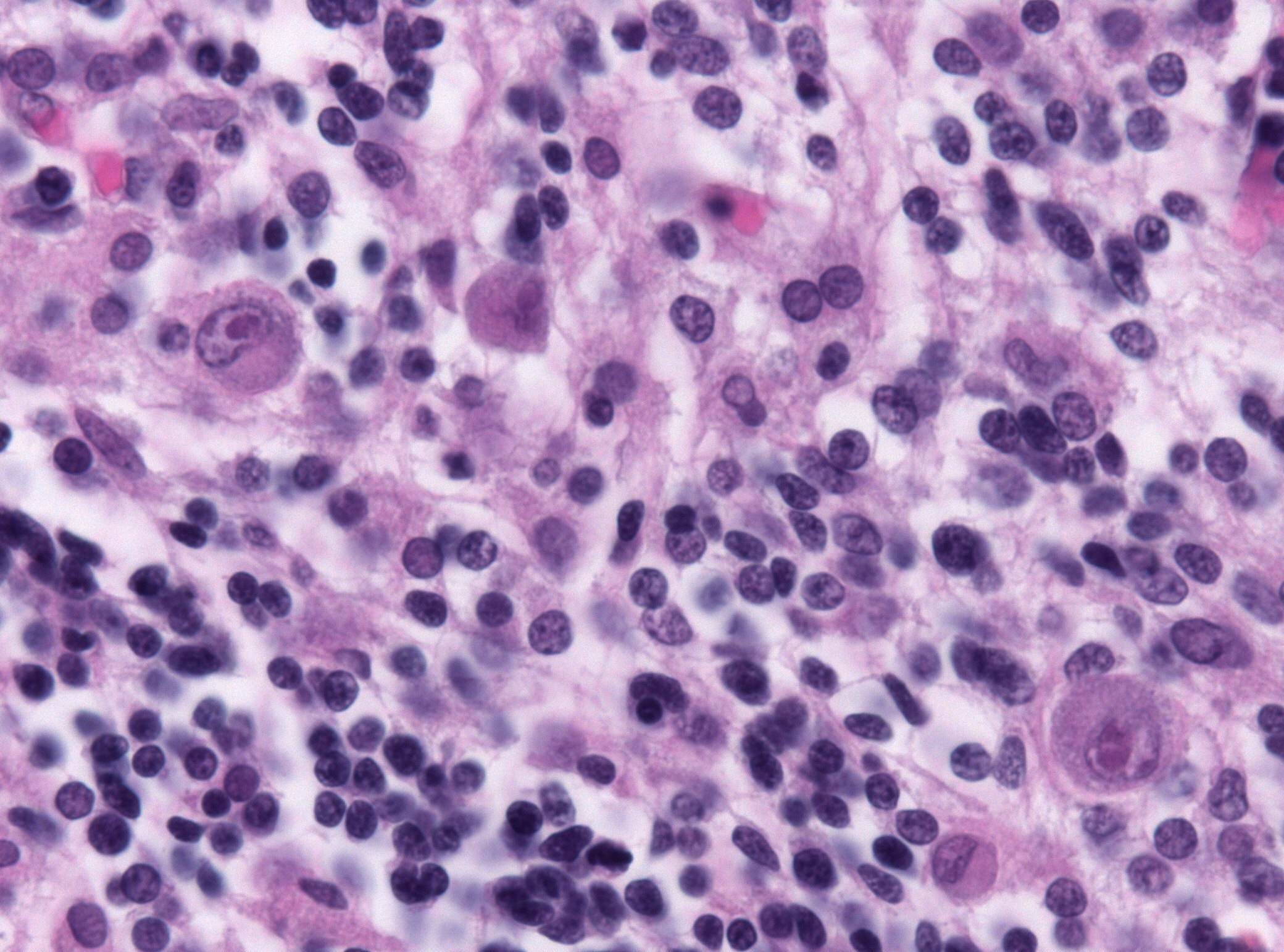
"Owl's-eye" viral inclusions, associated with Cytomegalovirus infection.

Giemsa stain is also used to visualize chromosomes. This is particularly relevant for detection of Cytomegalovirus infection, where the classical finding would be an "owl-eye" viral inclusion.

Giemsa stains the fungus Histoplasma, Chlamydia bacteria, and can be used to identify mast cells.

== Generation ==
Giemsa's solution is a mixture of methylene blue, eosin, and Azure B. The stain is usually prepared from commercially available Giemsa powder.

A thin film of the specimen on a microscope slide is fixed in pure methanol for 30 seconds, by immersing it or by putting a few drops of methanol on the slide. The slide is immersed in a freshly prepared 5% Giemsa stain solution for 20–30 minutes (in emergencies 5–10 minutes in 10% solution can be used), then flushed with tap water and left to dry. In areas with high environmental temperatures exceeding 25 °C, store the methanol at below 0 °C and geimsa stain at 2-8 °.C Fix the thin smear by dipping it in the cold methanol 0-20 °C for 1 to 2 seconds and air dry for 5 minutes. An air dryer maybe used for drying. Working solution should be reconstituted at a ratio of 90:5:5 90ml fresh/distilled water: 5ml geimsa stain:5ml methanol. Stain the fixed smear for 10 to 15 minutes. 15 minutes gives best results. Wash with running water and air dry. View at x100 with oil emersion. This enhances the robustness of the procedure at all temperature range.

== See also ==
- Biological stains and staining protocols
- Histology
- Leishman stain
- Microscopy
- Romanowsky stain
- Wright's stain
