= Ludwig Grünwald =

Ludwig Grünwald (10 February 1863, Vienna – 11 August 1927) was an Austrian born, German internist and otolaryngologist.

He studied medicine in Munich, where after graduation, he opened a practice in internal medicine. He became a specialist in the field of otorhinolaryngology, being credited as the first physician to attempt surgery for the treatment of nasal suppuration and disease associated with the ethmoid and sphenoid bones.

Along with internist Richard May (1863-1936), he developed a solution that later became known as the May–Grünwald stain, a stain used for peripheral blood film and bone marrow. His books on diseases of the larynx and on nasal suppuration have been translated into English.

Aside from otolaryngology, he is also remembered for his discovery of a large ecchymosis located in the umbilicus associated with acute pancreatitis, the Grünwald's sign.

== Selected writings ==
- Die Lehre von den Naseneiterungen mit besonderer Rücksicht auf die Erkrankungen des Sieb- und Keilbeins und deren chirurgische Behandlung. München, Leipzig, J. F. Lehmann, 1893. 2nd, revised, edition, 1896. English translation 1900.
- "Atlas and abstract of the diseases of the larynx", translated into English by Charles Prevost Grayson.
- "A treatise on nasal suppuration or, Suppurative diseases of the nose and its accessory sinuses"; Translated from the second German edition by William Lamb / London : Baillière, 1900.
- Atlas und Grundriss der Krankheiten der Mundhöhle, des Rachens und der Nase. second edition, enlarged and completely revised, 1902.
- Atlas und Grundriss der Kehlkopfkrankheiten. München, J. F. Lehmann, 1897. 100 pages. Volume 14 of Lehmann's Medizinische Handatlanten. second edition, enlarged and revised, as: Grundriss der Kehlkopfkrankheiten und Atlas der Laryngoskopie. München, 1907.
