= Eosin B =

Names
- IUPAC name 4′,5′-dibromo-3′,6′-dihydroxy-2′,7′-dinitro-1-spiro[isobenzofuran-3,9′-xanthene]one

Identifiers
CAS Number	548-24-3; 56360-46-4
3D model (JSmol)	Interactive image
ChEBI	CHEBI:68618
ChemSpider	398741
ECHA InfoCard	100.008.131
EC Number	208-943-1
MeSH	Eosine+I+Bluish
PubChem CID	452704
UNII	OMS4XQD1T0
CompTox Dashboard (EPA)	DTXSID80889350
- InChI: InChI=1S/C20H8Br2N2O9/c21-13-15(25)11(23(28)29)5-9-17(13)32-18-10(6-12(24(30)31)16(26)14(18)22)20(9)8-4-2-1-3-7(8)19(27)33-20/h1-6,25-26H Key: ZBQZBWKNGDEDOA-UHFFFAOYSA-N
- SMILES: C1=CC=C2C(=C1)C(=O)OC23C4=CC(=C(C(=C4OC5=C(C(=C(C=C35)[N+](=O)[O-])O)Br)Br)O)[N+](=O)[O-]

Properties
Chemical formula	C_{20}H_{6}Br_{2}N_{2}O_{9}
Molar mass	578.068
Melting point	295 °C
- Except where otherwise noted, data are given for materials in their standard state (at 25 °C [77 °F], 100 kPa). verify (what is ?) Infobox references

Eosin B is a form of eosin which is a dye compound. There is another form of eosin B dye and its chemical name is 4, 5-dibromo-2, 7dinitro- fluorescein or 4′,5′-dibromo-2′,7′-dinitro-3-oxo-3Hspiro[2-benzofuran-1,9′-xanthene]-3′,6′ diolate. This last form of eosin B is an organic laser dye.
