= Jenner's stain =

Stain used for blood smear microscopy

Jenner's stain (methylene blue eosinate) is used in microscopy for staining blood smears. The stain is dark blue and results in very observable clearly stained nuclei.
