= May–Grünwald stain =

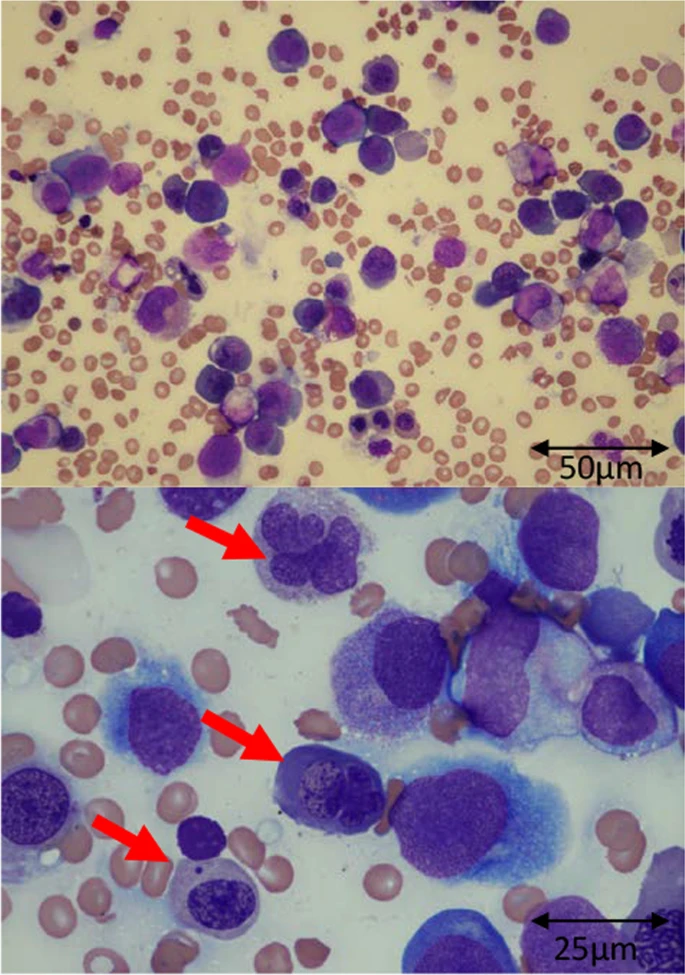
May Grünwald–Giemsa staining of bone marrow cells taken from a patient with hereditary folate malabsorption, from a case report by Yukari Sakurai et al., 2022

May–Grünwald stain is used for the staining of slides obtained by fine-needle aspiration in a histopathology lab for the diagnosis of tumorous cells.

Sometimes, it is combined with Giemsa staining, yielding Pappenheim staining (May–Grünwald–Giemsa staining).
