= Eosin Y =

Chemical compound

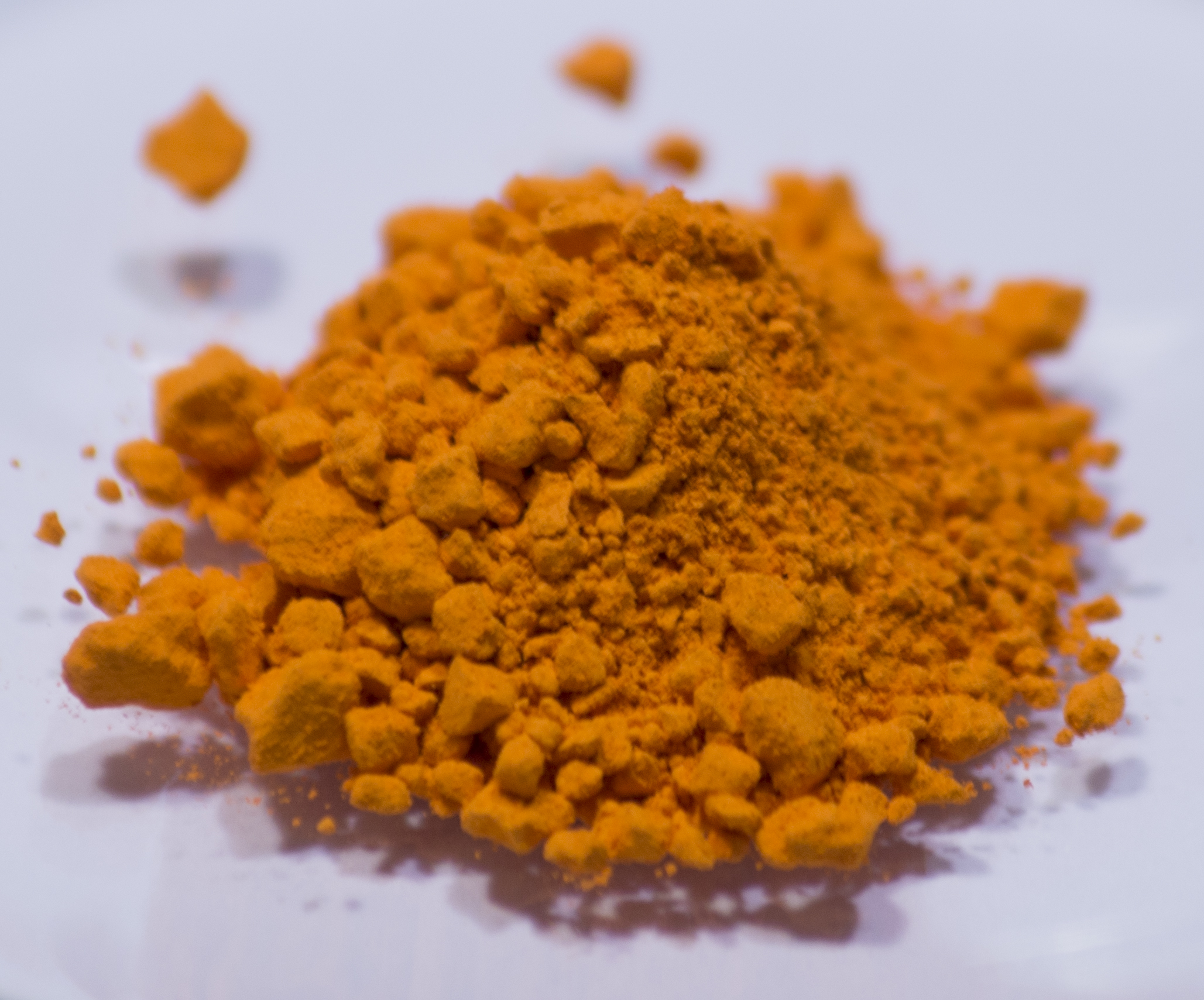

Names
- IUPAC name 2-(2,4,5,7-tetrabromo-6-oxido-3-oxo-3H-xanthen-9-yl)benzoate [in its deprotonated form]

Identifiers
CAS Number	17372-87-1
3D model (JSmol)	Interactive image
ChEBI	CHEBI:52053
ChEMBL	ChEMBL411675
ChemSpider	10580
ECHA InfoCard	100.037.629
MeSH	Eosine+Yellowish-(YS)
PubChem CID	11048
UNII	TDQ283MPCW
CompTox Dashboard (EPA)	DTXSID901015574 DTXSID0025234, DTXSID901015574
- InChI: InChI=1S/C20H8Br4O5.2Na/c21-11-5-9-13(7-3-1-2-4-8(7)20(27)28)10-6-12(22)17(26)15(24)19(10)29-18(9)14(23)16(11)25;;/h1-6,25H,(H,27,28);;/q;2*+1/p-2 Key: SEACYXSIPDVVMV-UHFFFAOYSA-L; InChI=1/C20H8Br4O5.2Na/c21-11-5-9-13(7-3-1-2-4-8(7)20(27)28)10-6-12(22)17(26)15(24)19(10)29-18(9)14(23)16(11)25;;/h1-6,25H,(H,27,28);;/q;2*+1/p-2 Key: SEACYXSIPDVVMV-NUQVWONBAJ
- SMILES: c1ccc(c(c1)c2c3cc(c(c(c3oc-4c(c(=O)c(cc24)Br)Br)Br)[O-])Br)C(=O)[O-].[Na+].[Na+]

Properties
Chemical formula	C_{20}H_{6}Br_{4}Na_{2}O_{5}
Molar mass	647.89052
Appearance	Red powder
Density	1.018 g·cm^{−3}
Melting point	295.5 °C (563.9 °F; 568.6 K)
- Except where otherwise noted, data are given for materials in their standard state (at 25 °C [77 °F], 100 kPa). verify (what is ?) Infobox references

Eosin Y, also called C.I. 45380 or C.I. Acid Red 87, is a member of the triarylmethane dyes. It is produced from fluorescein by bromination.

== Use ==
Eosin Y is commonly used as the red dye in red inks.

It is commonly used in histology, most notably in the H&E (Haematoxylin and Eosin) stain. Eosin Y is also widely used in the Papanicolaou stain (or Pap stain used in the Pap test) and the Romanowsky type cytologic stains. It is also used as a photosensitizer in organic synthesis.

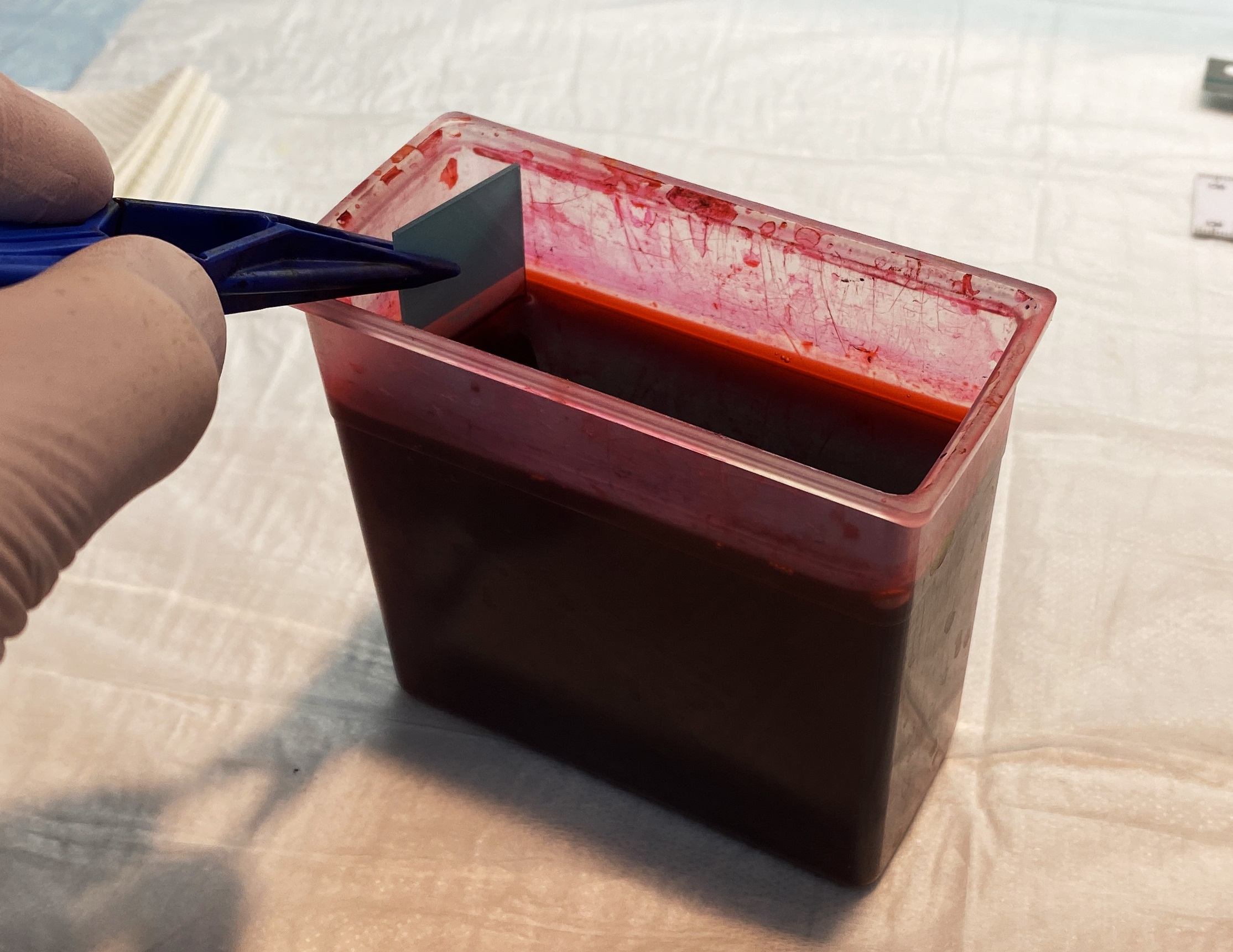
Eosin Y solution for staining microscopy slides.

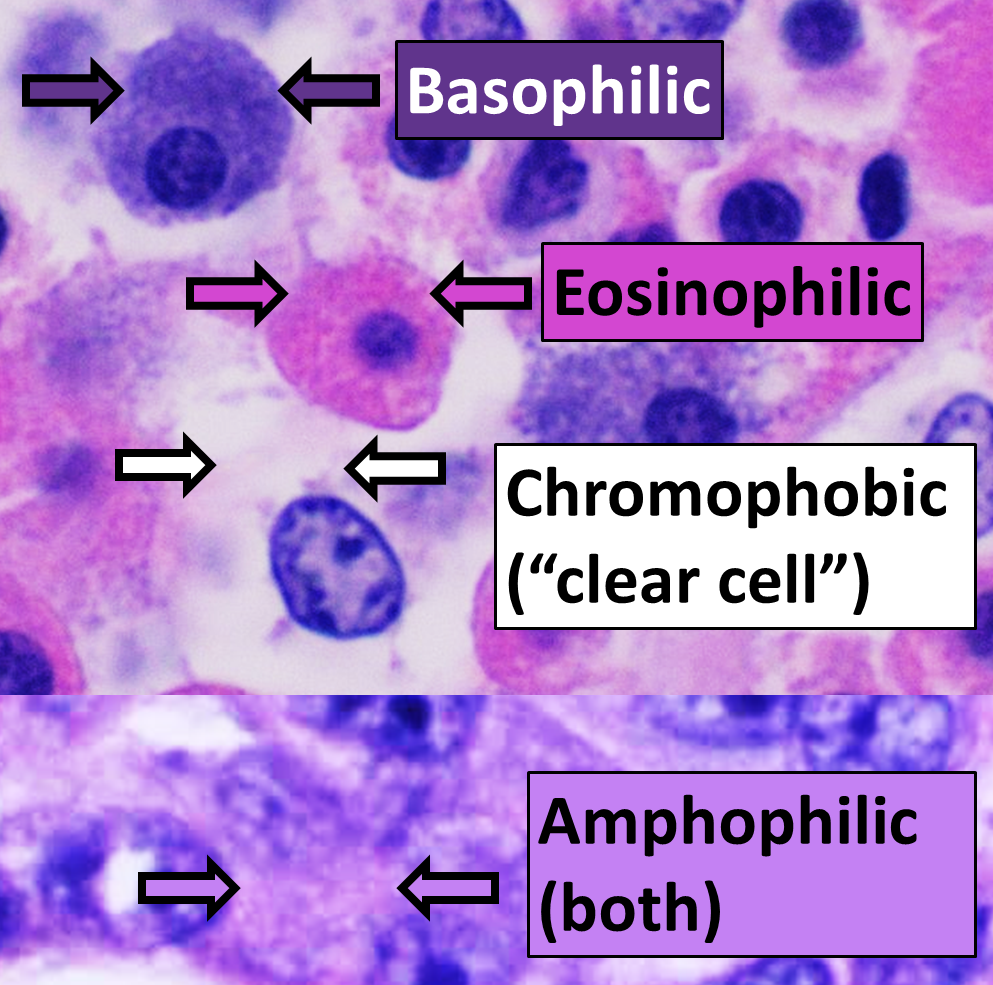
Eosinophilic staining, using eosin Y, compared to other patterns when using hematoxylin and eosin (H&E).

== See also ==
- Eosin
