= Eosin =

Group of bromo derivatives of fluorescein used as red dye

Eosin Y

Eosin B

Eosin is the name of several fluorescent acidic compounds which bind to and form salts with basic, or eosinophilic, compounds like proteins containing basic amino acid residues such as histidine, arginine and lysine, and stains them dark red or pink as a result of the actions of bromine on eosin. In addition to staining proteins in the cytoplasm, it can be used to stain collagen and muscle fibers for examination under the microscope. Structures that stain readily with eosin are termed eosinophilic. In the field of histology, Eosin Y is the form of eosin used most often as a histologic stain.

== History and etymology ==
Eosin was named by its inventor Heinrich Caro after the nickname (Eos) of a childhood friend, Anna Peters. It was commercialized (mainly for the textile industry) in 1874, in the same year when it was invented.

== Variants ==
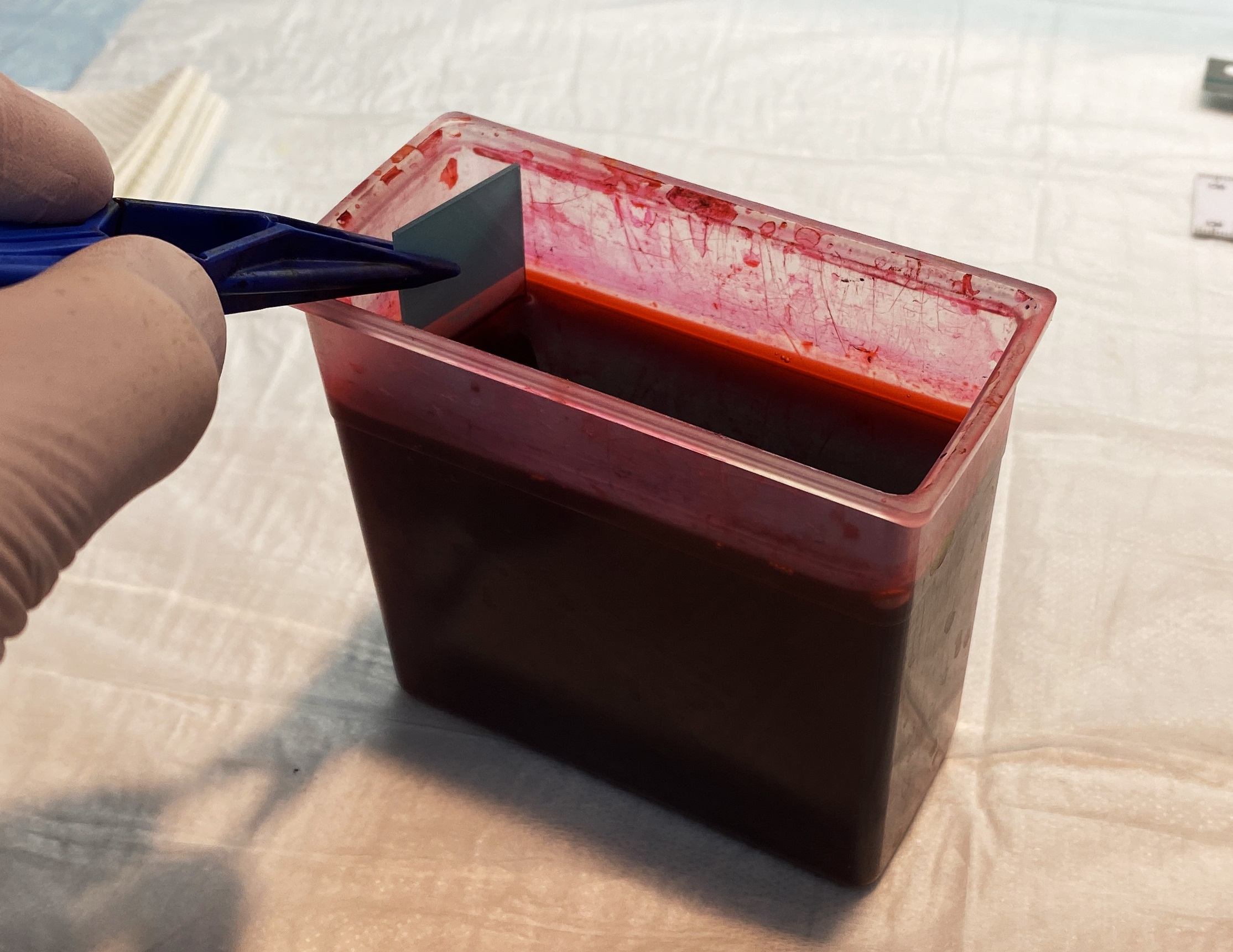
Eosin Y solution for staining microscopy slides

There are actually two very closely related compounds commonly referred to as eosin. Most often used is in histology is eosin Y, which is a tetra-bromo derivative of fluorescein and has a very slightly yellowish cast. It is also known as eosin Y ws, eosin yellowish, Acid Red 87, C.I. 45380, bromoeosine, bromofluoresceic acid, and D&C Red No. 22. The other eosin compound is eosin B, which is a dibromo derivative and has a very faint bluish cast. It is also known as eosin bluish, Acid Red 91, C.I. 45400, Saffrosine, Eosin Scarlet, and imperial red. The two dyes are interchangeable, and the use of one or the other is a matter of preference and tradition.

Food dye tetraiodofluorescein was historically known as Bluish Eosine, Eosin J or iodo-eosine but is now called erythrosine or Red 3.

== Uses ==
=== Use in histology ===
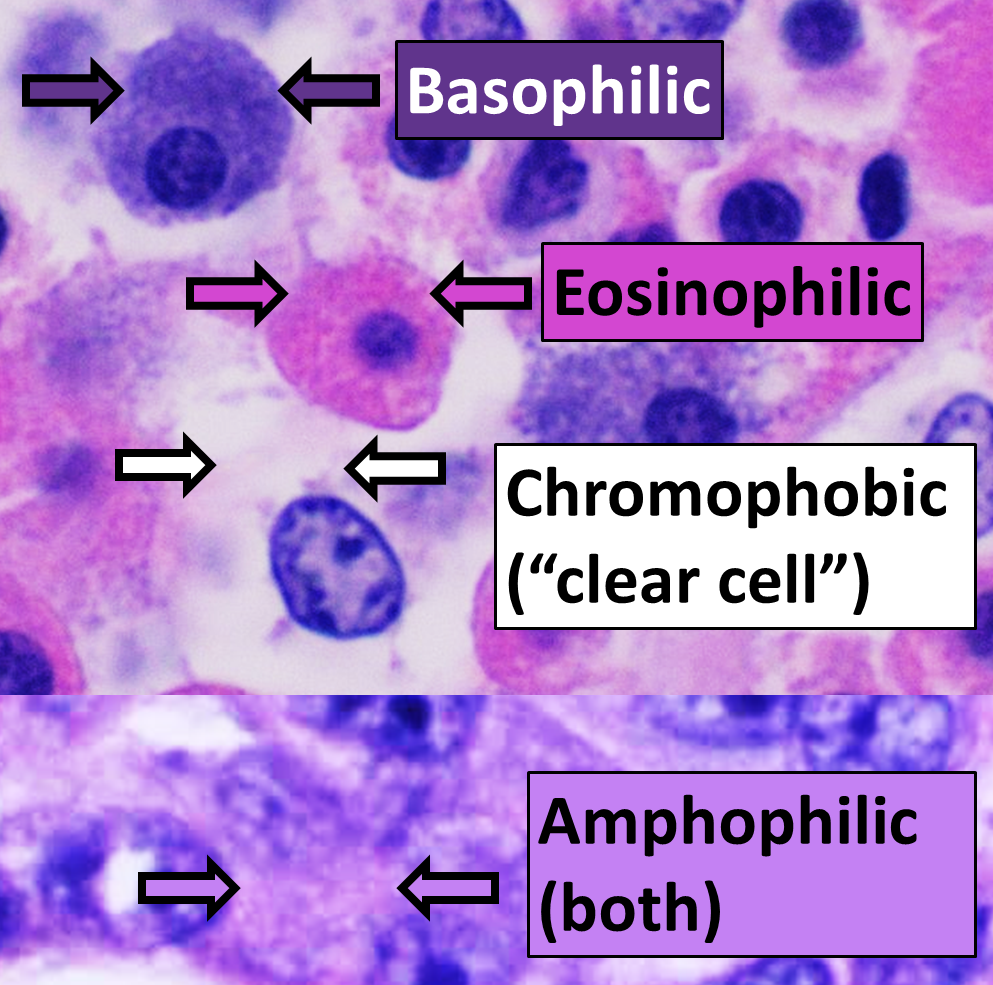
Eosinophilic staining, compared to other patterns when using hematoxylin and eosin (H&E)

Eosin is most often used as a counterstain to hematoxylin in H&E (haematoxylin and eosin) staining. H&E staining is one of the most commonly used techniques in histology. Tissue stained with haematoxylin and eosin shows cytoplasm stained pink-orange and nuclei stained darkly, either blue or purple. Eosin also stains red blood cells intensely red.

For staining, eosin Y is typically used in concentrations of 1 to 5 percent weight by volume, dissolved in water or ethanol. For prevention of mold growth in aqueous solutions, thymol is sometimes added. A small concentration (0.5 percent) of acetic acid usually gives a deeper red stain to the tissue.

It is listed as an IARC class 3 carcinogen (safe).

=== Other uses ===
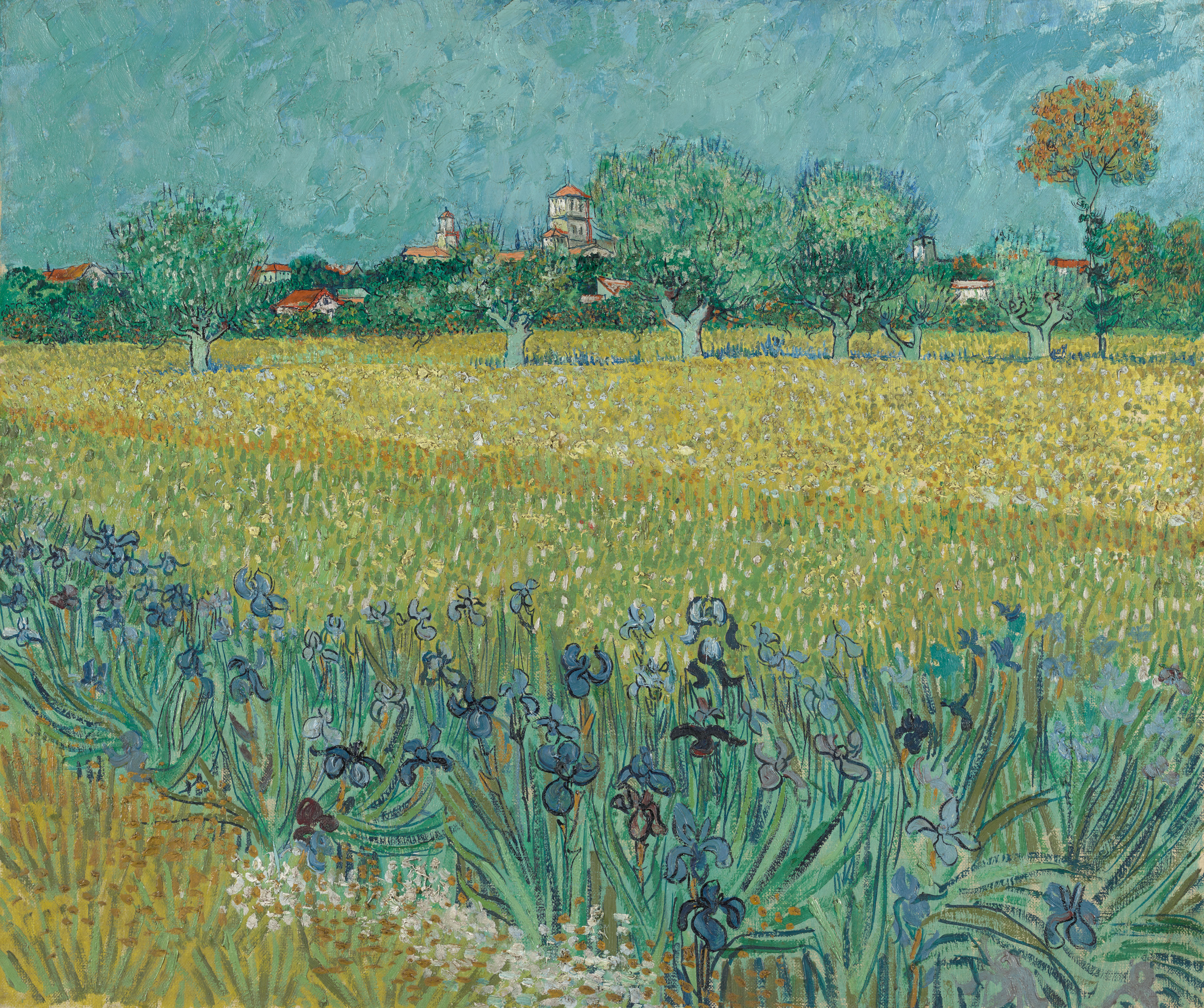
In his Field with Irises near Arles painting, Van Gogh incorporated red eosin dye into the color of the irises depicted at the bottom of the painting. Due to eosin's tendency to fade, the petals have now attained a blueish hue from their original purple coloration.

Eosin is also used as a red dye in inks; however, the molecule, especially that of eosin Y, tends to degrade over time, leaving behind its bromine atoms, hence causing paint incorporating such a dye to obtain a darker brown tinge over time. A notable user of eosin dye was the Post-Impressionist painter Van Gogh.

== See also ==
- Romanowsky stain
- H&E (haematoxylin and eosin) staining
- Merbromin
