= Blue bottle experiment =

Color-changing redox chemical reaction

Blue bottle reaction video

The blue bottle experiment is a color-changing redox chemical reaction. An aqueous solution containing glucose, sodium hydroxide, methylene blue is prepared in a closed bottle containing some air. Upon standing, it spontaneously turns from blue to colorless due to reduction of methylene blue by the alkaline glucose solution. However, shaking the bottle oxidizes methylene blue back into its blue form. With further shaking, this color-change cycle can be repeated many times. This experiment is a classic chemistry demonstration that can be used in laboratory courses as a general chemistry experiment to study chemical kinetics and reaction mechanism. The reaction also works with other reducing agents besides glucose and other redox indicator dyes besides methylene blue.

== Reactions ==
=== History and general concept ===
Blue Bottle Reaction Scheme

The mechanism of the blue bottle experiment requires an understanding of rates and mechanisms of complex interacting chemical reactions. In complex chemical reactions, individual sub-reactions can occur simultaneously but at significantly different rates. These, in turn, can be affected by reagent concentration and temperature. In most cases, the overall reaction rate is determined by the fastest single component reaction. However, when some processes form intermediate molecules which then react in other processes to form the end product, the rate of the overall reaction is determined by the rate of the slowest reaction. In such circumstances the intermediate products are usually in a steady state at low concentrations because they are highly reactive. Equilibrium state requires that all reaction forward and backward mechanism happens at the same rate. Thus, the overall net reaction is determined by the sum of all the mechanism steps where the rate depends on the concentration and temperature. The blue bottle experiment illustrates this principle of interacting reactions with different rates.

The blue bottle experiment requires only three reagents: potassium hydroxide solution, dextrose solution, and dilute methylene blue solution. These reagents are added to a flask, mixed, and the flask is stoppered. The initial color of the solution is blue, but upon standing for a short interval it spontaneously fades to colorless, as the alkaline dextrose solution reduces the methylene blue to colorless leuco-methylene blue. Shaking the flask causes oxygen present in the head space air to dissolve in the solution and oxidize the leuco-methylene blue back to its colored form again. Another variation uses methylene blue in water, glucose, and caustic soda (NaOH). There are many versions of the experiment, however, unlike the classical version where dye is necessary to use as a catalyst for the reaction, the green and rapid versions undergo autoxidation even in the absence of the dye.

In the past, it was thought that the reaction occurred by the oxidation of an aldehyde group to a carboxylic acid under alkaline conditions. For instance, glucose would be oxidized to gluconate by oxygen. However, the experiment also works with compounds such as vitamin C and benzoin, which do not contain an aldehyde group. Thus, the reaction is actually the oxidation of an acyloin or related α-hydroxycarbonyl group, which is a structural feature of glucose, to a 1,2-diketone. The reduced redox dye (colorless state) is formed from oxidized redox dye (blue). The color-change that occurs in the blue bottle experiment has features of a clock reaction, in which a visible change in the concentration of one or more reagents suddenly occurs upon the exhaustion of a limiting reagent. For example, the limiting reactant, oxygen, is consumed by another reactant, benzoin, with the help of safranin as a catalyst. Once the limited amount of oxygen has been used up, the catalyst is unable to change forms, and as a result, the solution changes color.

Blue Bottle in Different Temperature Time-lapse Coldest (left) to Warmest (right)

Blue Bottle with Manometer Video

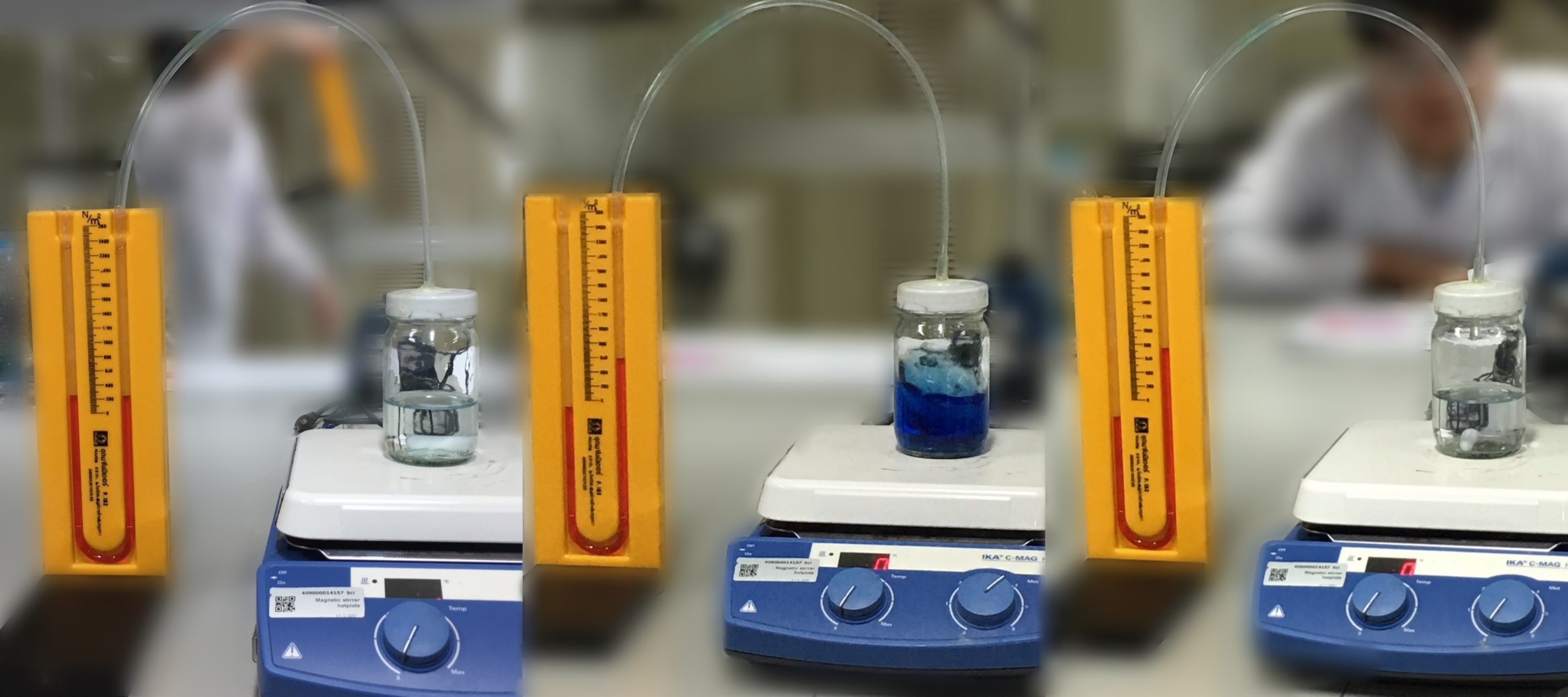
Blue Bottle with Manometer

=== Classical version ===
The aqueous solution in the classical reaction contains glucose, sodium hydroxide and methylene blue. In the first step an acyloin of glucose is formed. The next step is a redox reaction of the acyloin with methylene blue in which the glucose is oxidized to diketone in alkaline solution and methylene blue is reduced to colorless leucomethylene blue. If there is enough oxygen available (i.e., after shaking the bottle), leucomethylene blue is immediately re-oxidized to methylene blue and the blue color of the solution persists. However, when the solution is left to rest, the dissolved oxygen is gradually irreversibly consumed, and at the point where it has been completely exhausted, the glucose reduction of methylene blue proceeds unopposed and the color of the solution rapidly disappears. The reaction is first order in glucose, methylene blue and hydroxide ion and zero-order in oxygen. The process can be described as a pseudo first order reaction, and can be used to illustrate the changing concentrations of the reagents over the course of the reaction as the solution changes from blue back to colorless.

The final glucose oxidation products besides sodium gluconate have been identified as D-arabino-hexos-2-ulose (glucosone), the anion of D-arabinonate after splitting off of a formate anion and arabinonic acid.

=== Sustainable version ===
Wellman and Noble proposed a new formulation for the Blue Bottle experiment in which vitamin C serves as a reducing agent instead of glucose; the methylene blue and oxygen are still used. Copper is added as a catalyst for the reoxidation of leucomethylene blue to methylene blue. These modifications give an experiment that generates a smaller amount of waste that is less corrosive and easier to neutralize, along with changing the mixture color to a green-blue color, and therefore is an example of green chemistry modification.

=== Rapid version ===
The Chen autoxidation of benzoin had performed a similar experiment with respect to the classical and green versions. It was found that the traffic light and vanishing valentine experiments can become successful regardless of whether a sugar is added. One variation is more rapid, with the number of color change cycles do not last as long as the classical and green versions because the reactants are present in smaller amounts; also, the reducing agent for this experiment is benzoin, which is added to help increase the number of cycles in the solution. Moreover, the usable period in this experiment is quite short. Although the experiment is prepared overnight, the reducing agent can be added at any time to be able to observe the solution more.

=== Enzymatic version ===
Zhang, Tsitkov, and Hess from Columbia University proposed an enzymatic version of the "blue bottle experiment". They named it the "green bottle experiment", since the system is colored green and the reagents are safer than classical approaches. The experiment is performed in a clear glass vial containing two common enzymes (glucose oxidase and horseradish peroxidase), glucose, and 2,2′-azino-bis(3-ethylbenzothiazoline-6-sulphonic acid) (abbreviated as ABTS) in PBS buffer. A thin layer of oil is used to block the solution from the air. The solution initially turns green and then turns colorless with the depletion of dissolved oxygen. Shaking the solution introduces fresh oxygen and colors the solution green again until the oxygen is consumed.

This version relies on three enzymatic reactions. First, the glucose oxidase catalyzes the oxidation of glucose in the presence of oxygen and produces hydrogen peroxide. Second, the horseradish peroxidase utilizes the hydrogen peroxide to oxidize ABTS to its radical cationic form, ABTS^{+•}. As the dissolved oxygen is consumed in the solution, the third reaction occurs: glucose oxidase catalyzes the reduction of ABTS^{+•} back to ABTS in the presence of glucose. This system can also form beautiful patterns arising from reaction-driven Rayleigh–Bénard convection.

== Variation of dyes ==
The chemical reactions and mechanism in the blue bottle experiment rely on the oxidation of a sugar with the aid of air and a redox dye in a basic solution. Other variations of this reaction have been reported that use four families of redox dyes: thiazines, oxazines, azines, and indigo carmine have all been reported to work with glucose and caustic soda.

=== Chemical traffic light experiment ===
The chemical traffic light is a color-changing redox reaction that is related to the blue bottle experiment. One of the early formulas consists of glucose, sodium hydroxide, indigo carmine (dye), and water. Another formula consists of indigo carmine, ascorbic acid (Vitamin C), sodium bicarbonate, sodium chloride, copper(II) sulfate, sodium hydroxide and water. By doing so, chemical waste and the level of corrosive chemicals is reduced. The amount of solid chemicals dissolved in the experiment could be reduced from 60 grams to 6 grams. And the pH could be lowered from 13 to 3 which is easier to neutralize the pH to 7 by adding baking soda before disposal. Also, it is safer and the reactions also occur faster and are easier to perform.

At first, all chemicals are added together and the color appears yellow. After shaking, the color turns green and then changes to red after it is left untouched. When further observed, the color turns back to yellow, which is why the solution is called the chemical traffic light. This reaction can be repeated many times, but it needs additional oxygen or indigo carmine.

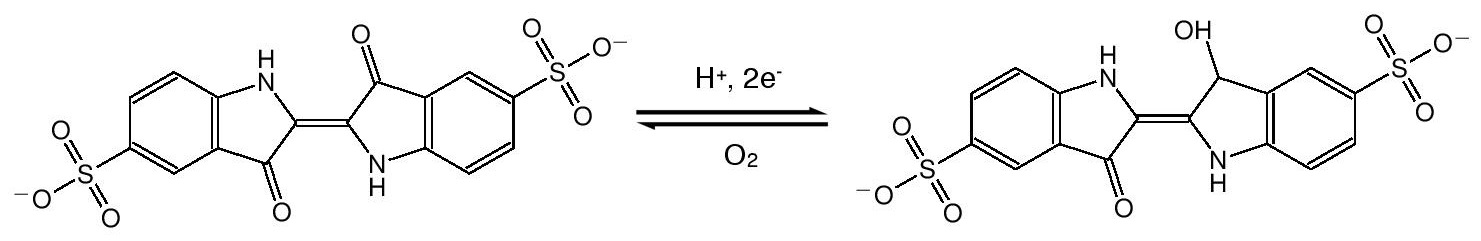

This reaction occurs by oxidation and reduction of the solution where alkaline glucose solution is acting as a reducing agent. The glucose solution is added to the solution containing indicator (dye indigo carmine) the color changes occur. This reaction is also known as chemical clock experiment because concentrations of the products and reactants changed over the specific period. When the solution is shaken, oxygen dissolves in the solution and oxidizes indigo carmine. Solution becomes red if a small amount of oxygen is dissolved, and green if all of indigo carmine is oxidized. The solution will turn back to original yellow color when the concentration of oxygen level drops.

Chemical traffic light reaction time-lapse

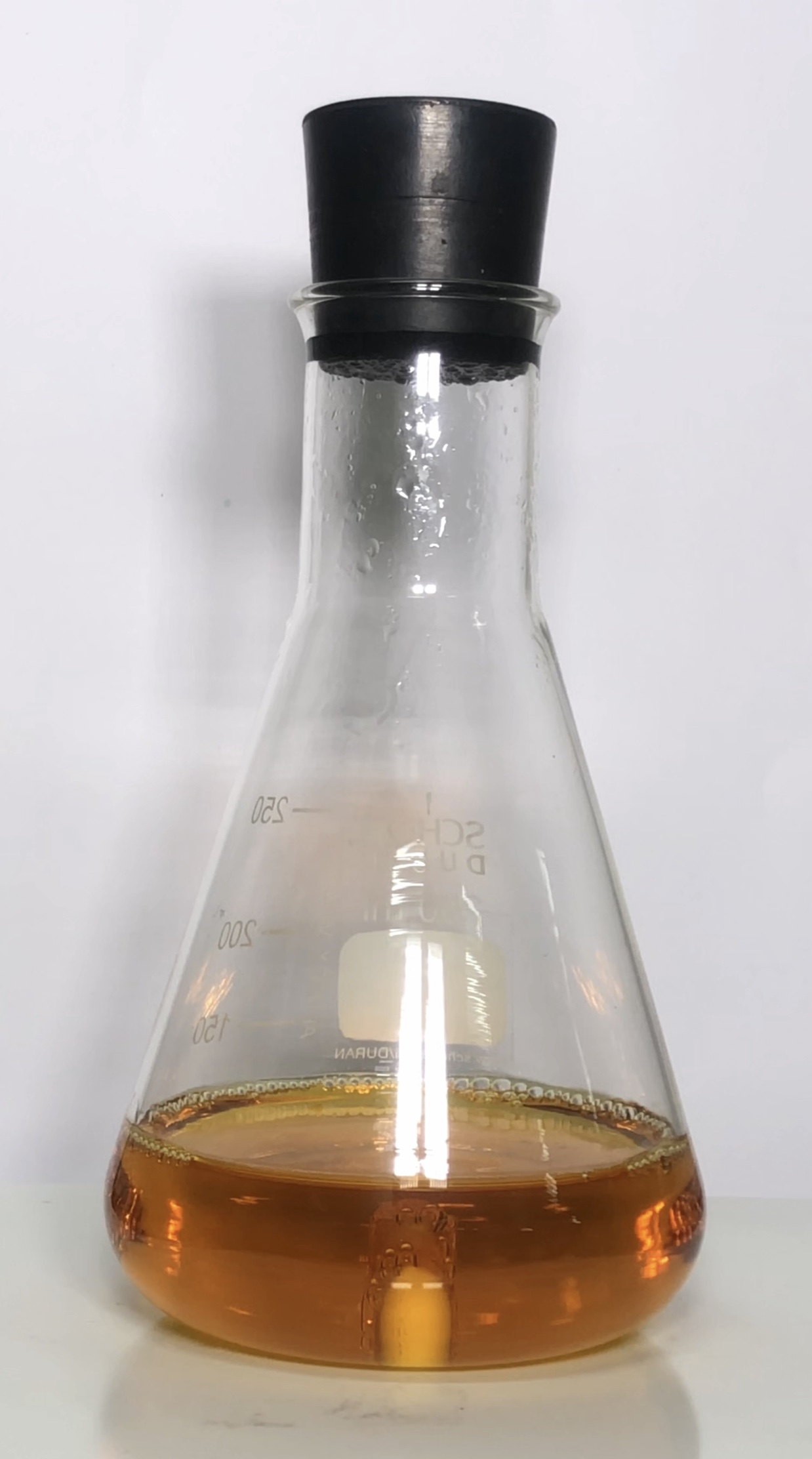
Chemical traffic light reaction (yellow)

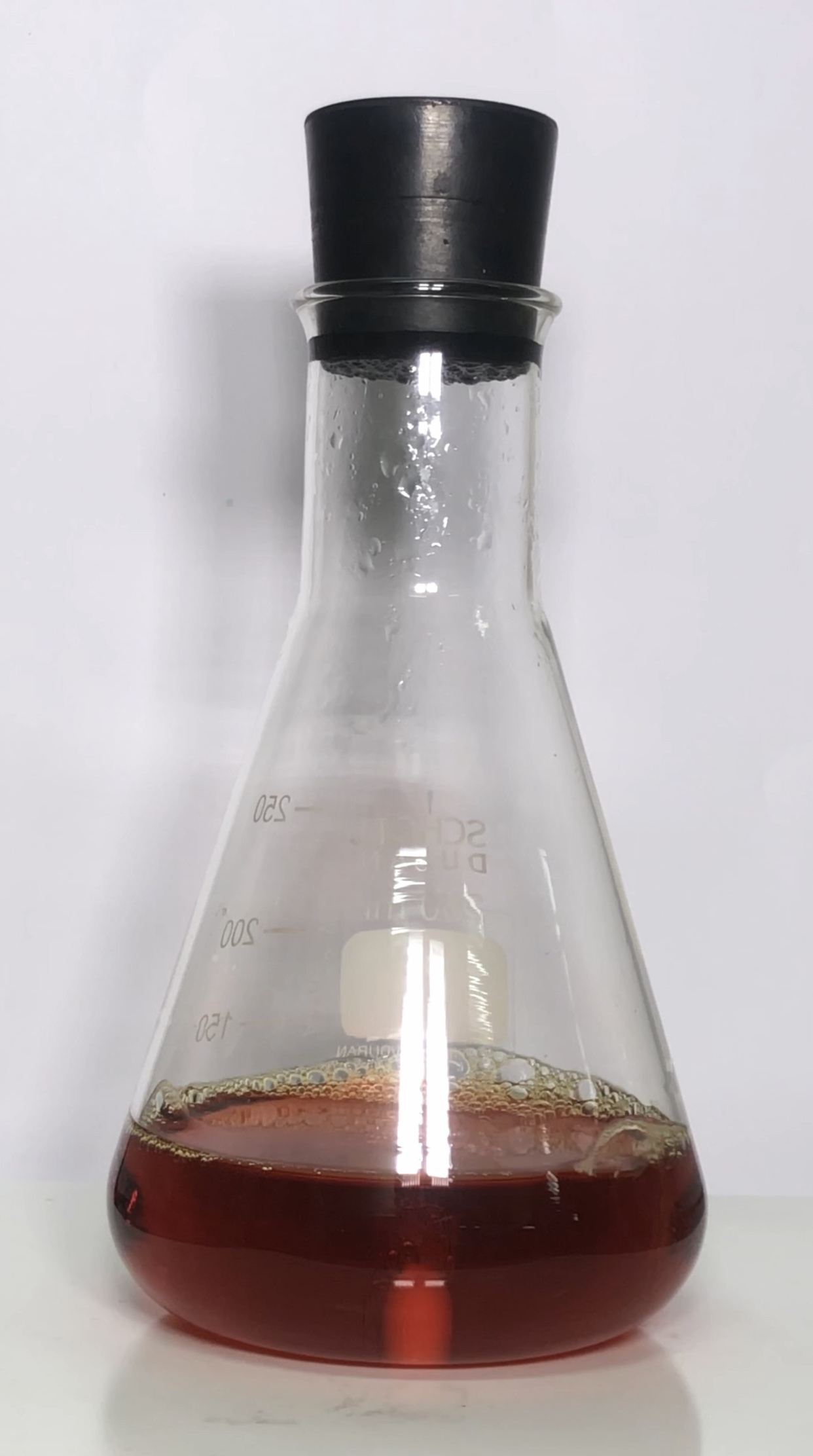
Chemical traffic light reaction (red)

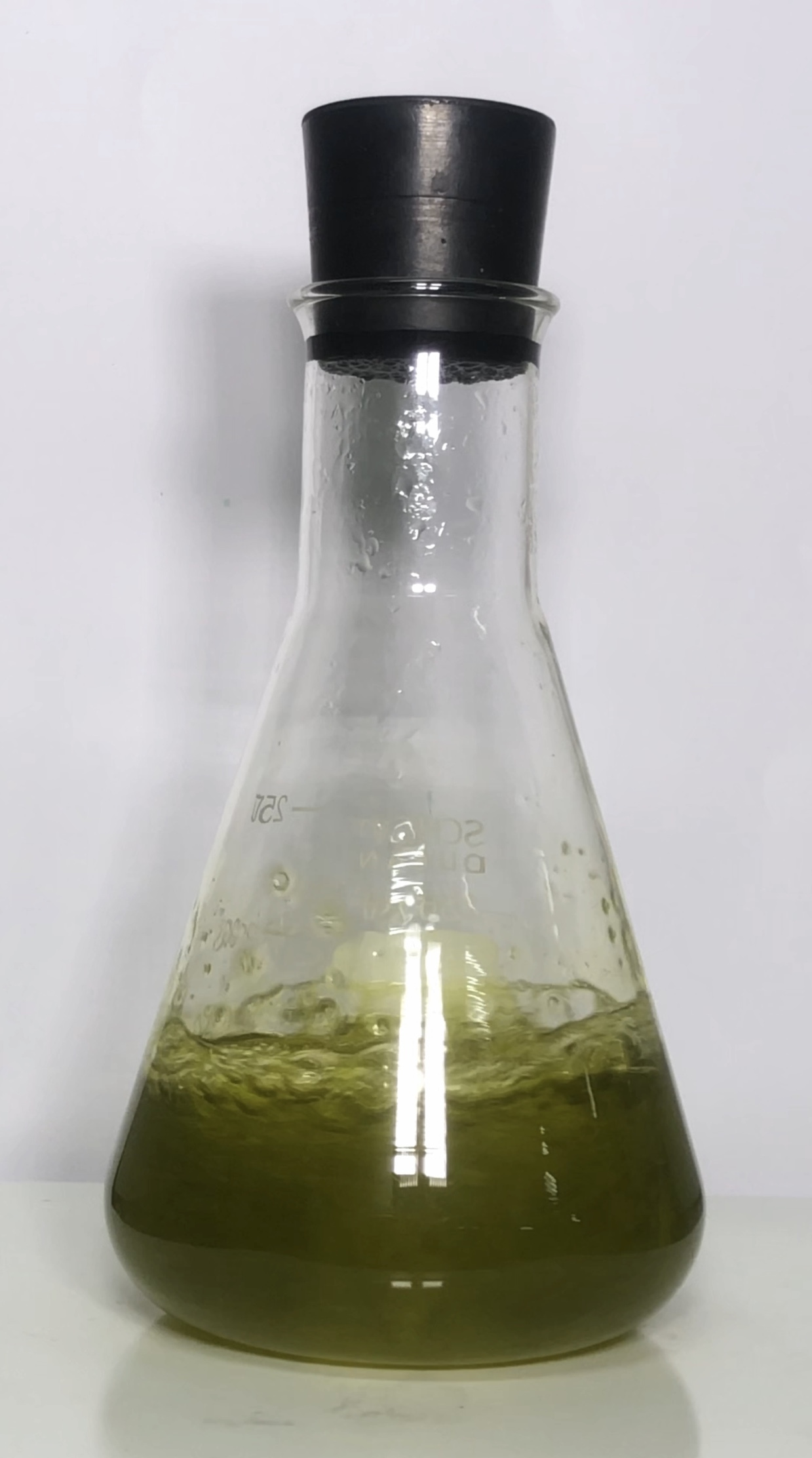
Chemical traffic light reaction (green)

=== Vanishing valentine experiment ===
The vanishing valentine experiment is another chemical reaction related to the blue bottle experiment. This reaction occurs when water, glucose, sodium hydroxide, and resazurin is mixed in a flask. When the solution is shaken, it turns from light blue to a reddish color. The solution turns back to a light blue after being left to stand for a while. This reaction can be repeated several times.

After mixing all the components, shake the bottle and the color will turn to red or pink depend on the amount of resazurin in the solution. More resazurin will result in more time needed for the solution to turn back the color and the intensity of the red color.

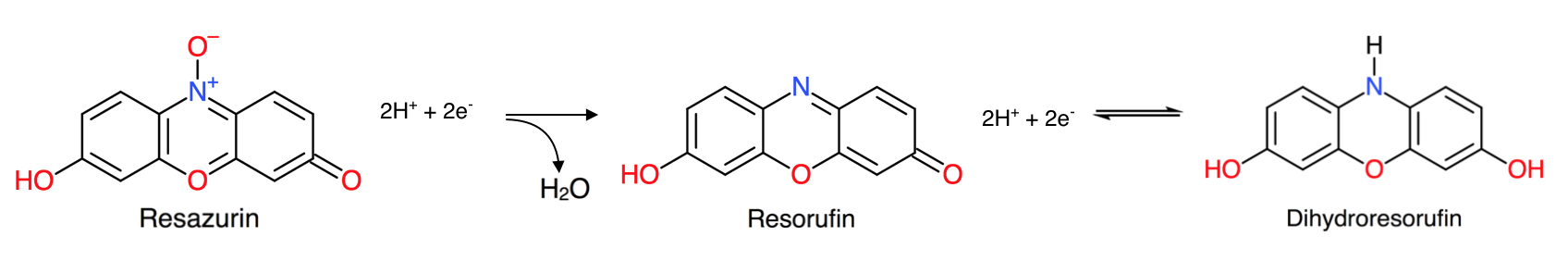

The chemical reaction stimulates glucose to reduce resazurin to resorufin. It would then be reduced again into a colorless compound called dihydroresorufin. When dihydroresorufin is shaken, it is oxidized back to resorufin. This is due to the fact that shaking it results oxygen in the bottle to oxidized dihydroresorufin back into resorufin.

solution turn from colorless to red

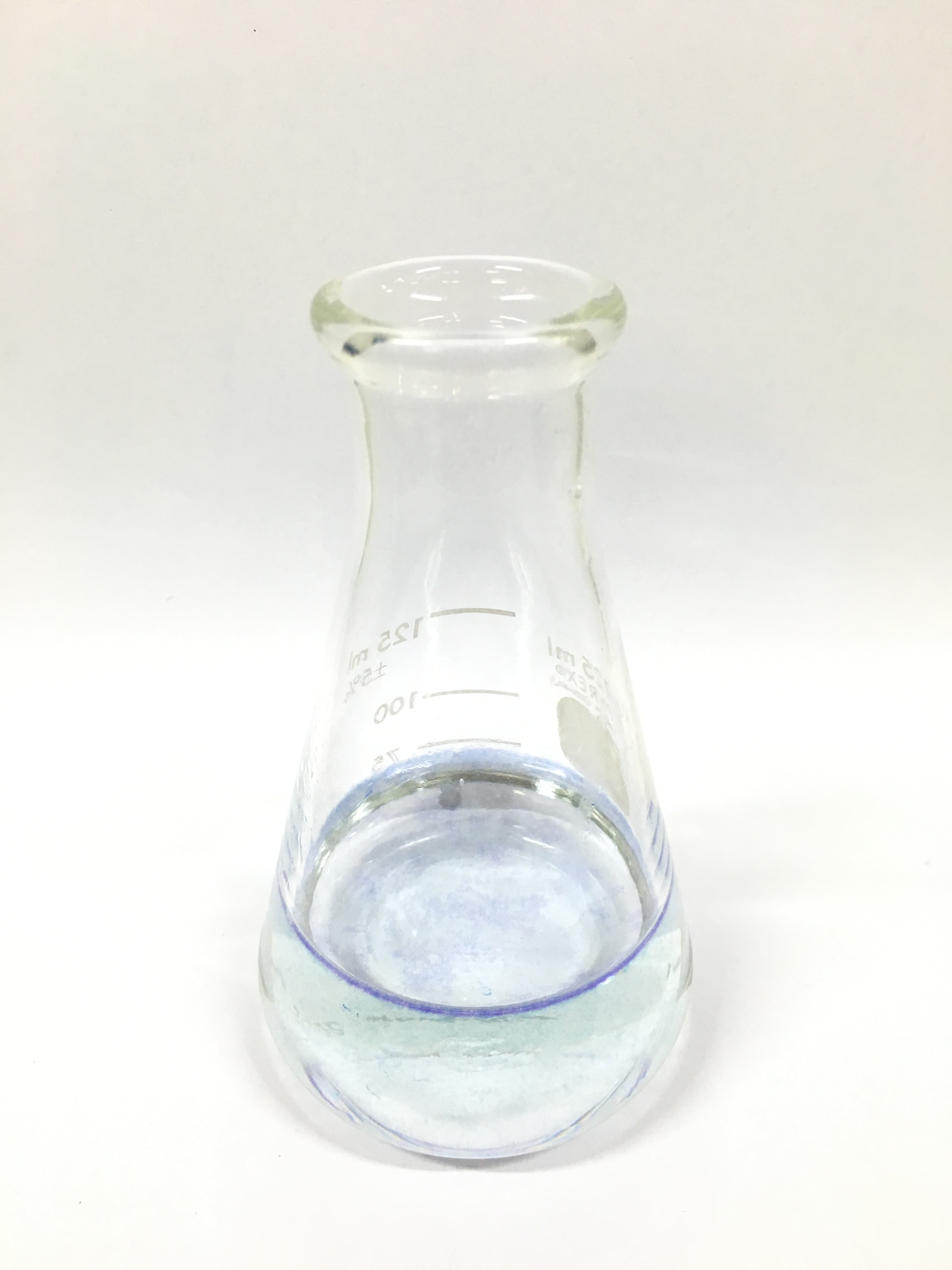
reduced color of the experiment

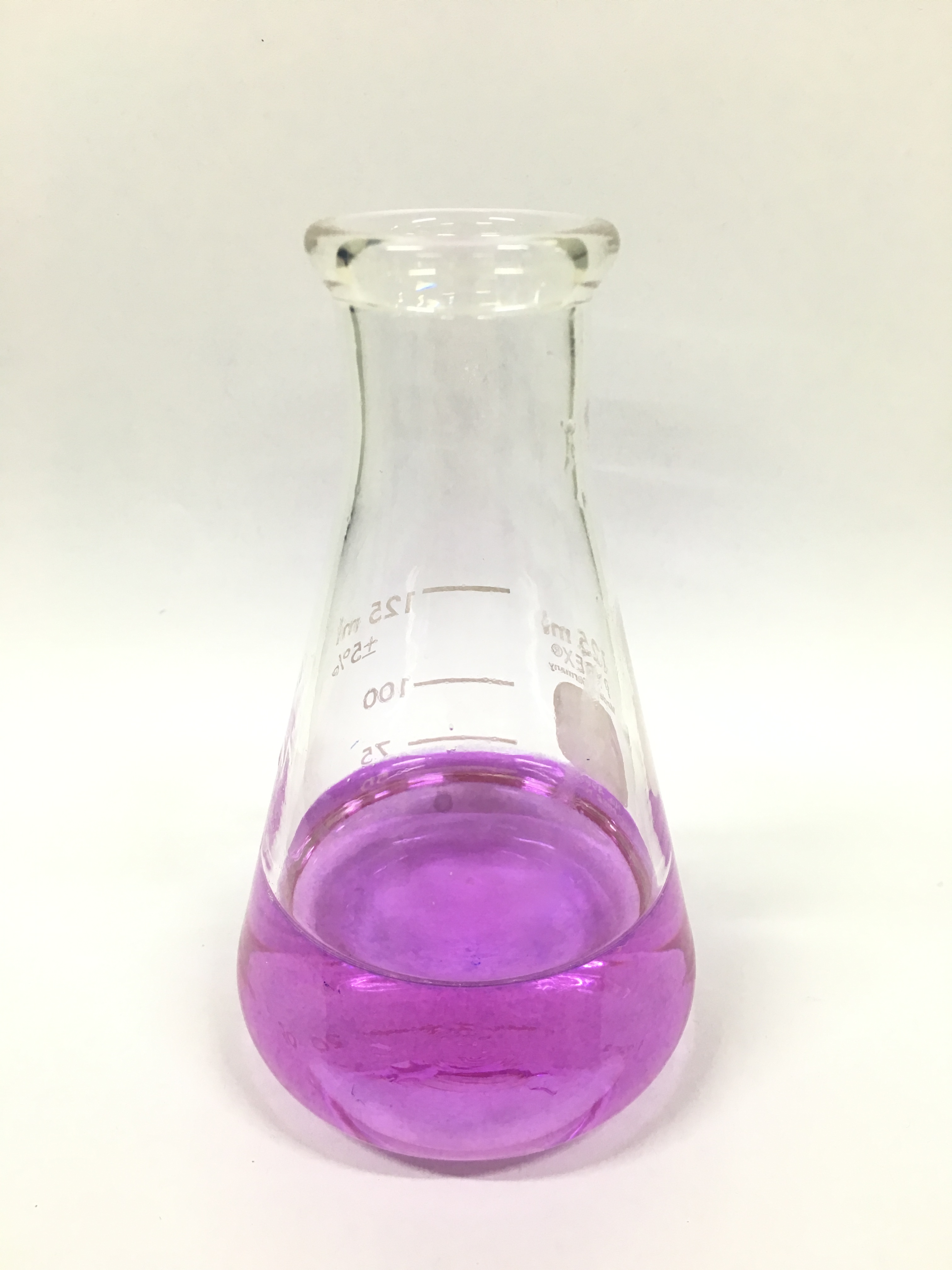
oxidized color of the experiment

=== Others ===
Gatorade

Erioglaucine, a food colorant and a redox dye, was found to be an effective substitute for methylene blue in the blue bottle experiment. Since some candies and drinks such as Gatorade contain the dye and a reducing sugar, only sodium hydroxide need be added to turn these food products into a blue bottle solution.

Purple flask

Thionine can be used in the green version of the experiment in combination with copper/iron catalyst to create the purple flask.

== Pattern formation ==
Pattern formation is when a solution containing NaOH, glucose, and dye is poured into a Petri dish that is open to the atmosphere. This will result in solution changing its structure over a period of time. Structures arise from molecular transport through diffusion and chemical kinetics. Patterns formed in the Petri dish can be described as a mosaic pattern; web-like, dynamic spiral, branching, and lines connecting to each others.

Changes in pattern formation are not homogeneous and can be affected by several factors. Different types of dye in solution will give the same pattern because of the bond's formation and the dynamics remain the same, this is because the solution has the same colour as the dye. Different amounts of dye can result in density change in the solution and this results in changing of convective motion. Different amounts of dye can bring in different amounts of convention cells which are also formed by different amounts of glucose and oxidized product. This can result in an interesting spatial phenomena. Time can also affect pattern formation. As the time passed, one pattern gradually faded away. Spirals and branches started to disappear and eventually disappeared fully. These facts indicate that oxygen affects the chemical reaction and this plays a fundamental role in the pattern formation. Pattern formation may also form from a chemically driven convective instability. This means that matter is exchanged across the air-reaction mixture interface, due to the fluctuations in the molecular nature of chemical systems. The temperature can affect the formation of pattern. Colder temperature formed a clearer pattern than hot temperature. The shape of the Petri dish also contributed to the pattern formation.

Pattern Formation from Blue Bottle Experiment in Ice Water Bath Time-lapse

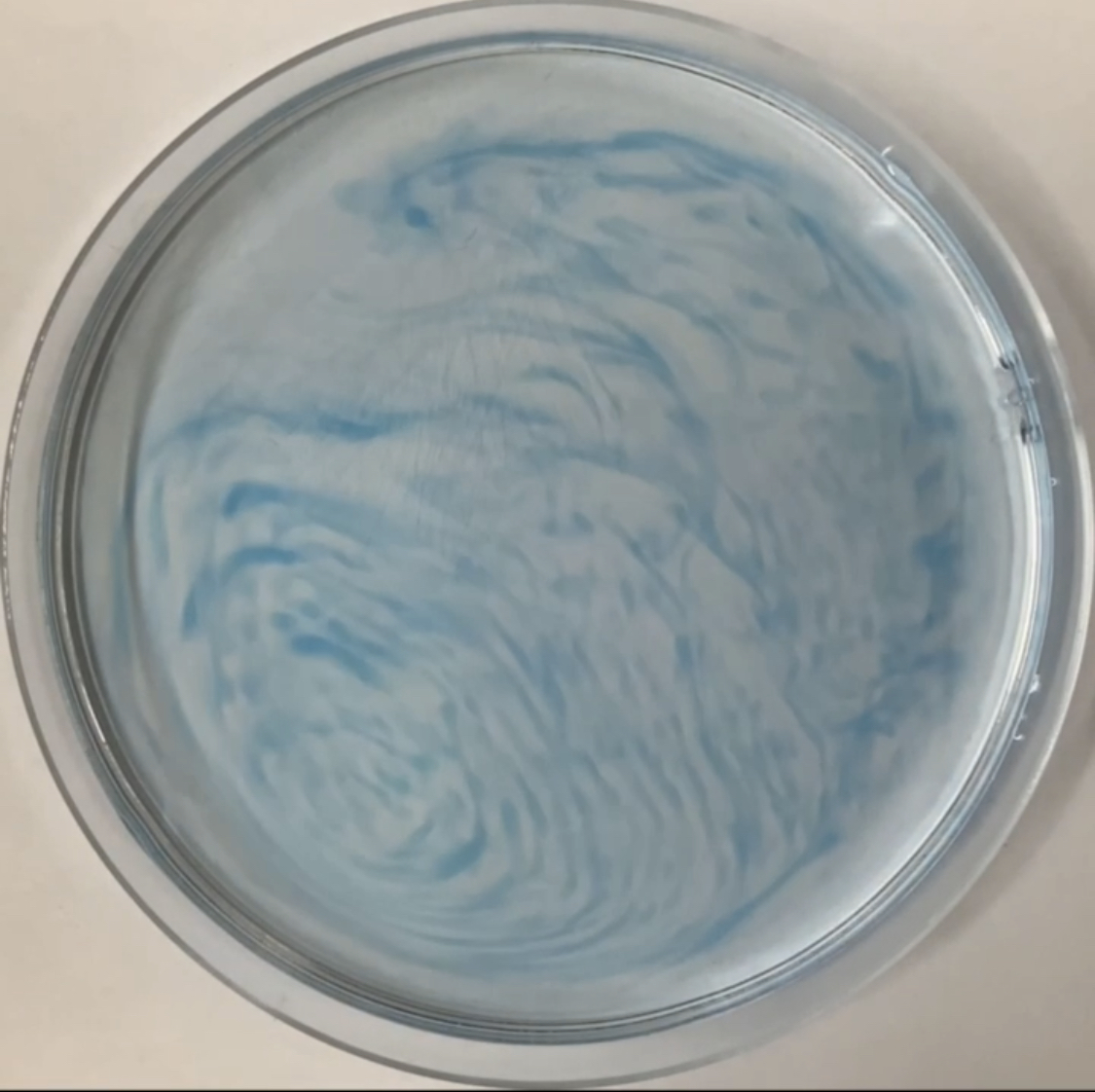
Pattern Formation from Blue Bottle Experiment in Ice Water Bath

Pattern Formation from Blue Bottle Experiment in Cold Water Bath Time-lapse

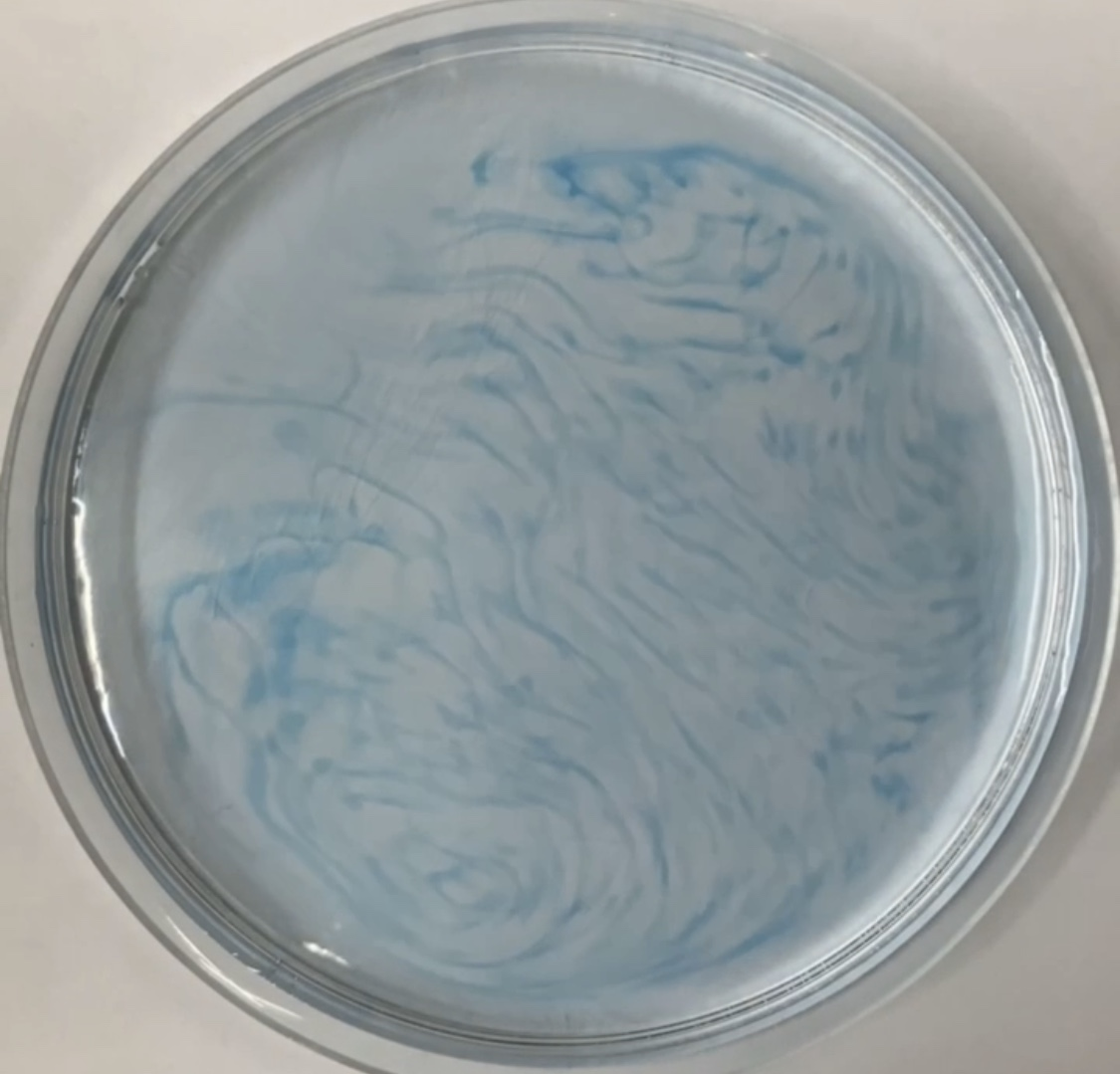
Pattern Formation from Blue Bottle Experiment in Cold Water

Pattern Formation from Blue Bottle Experiment in Room Temperature Time-lapse

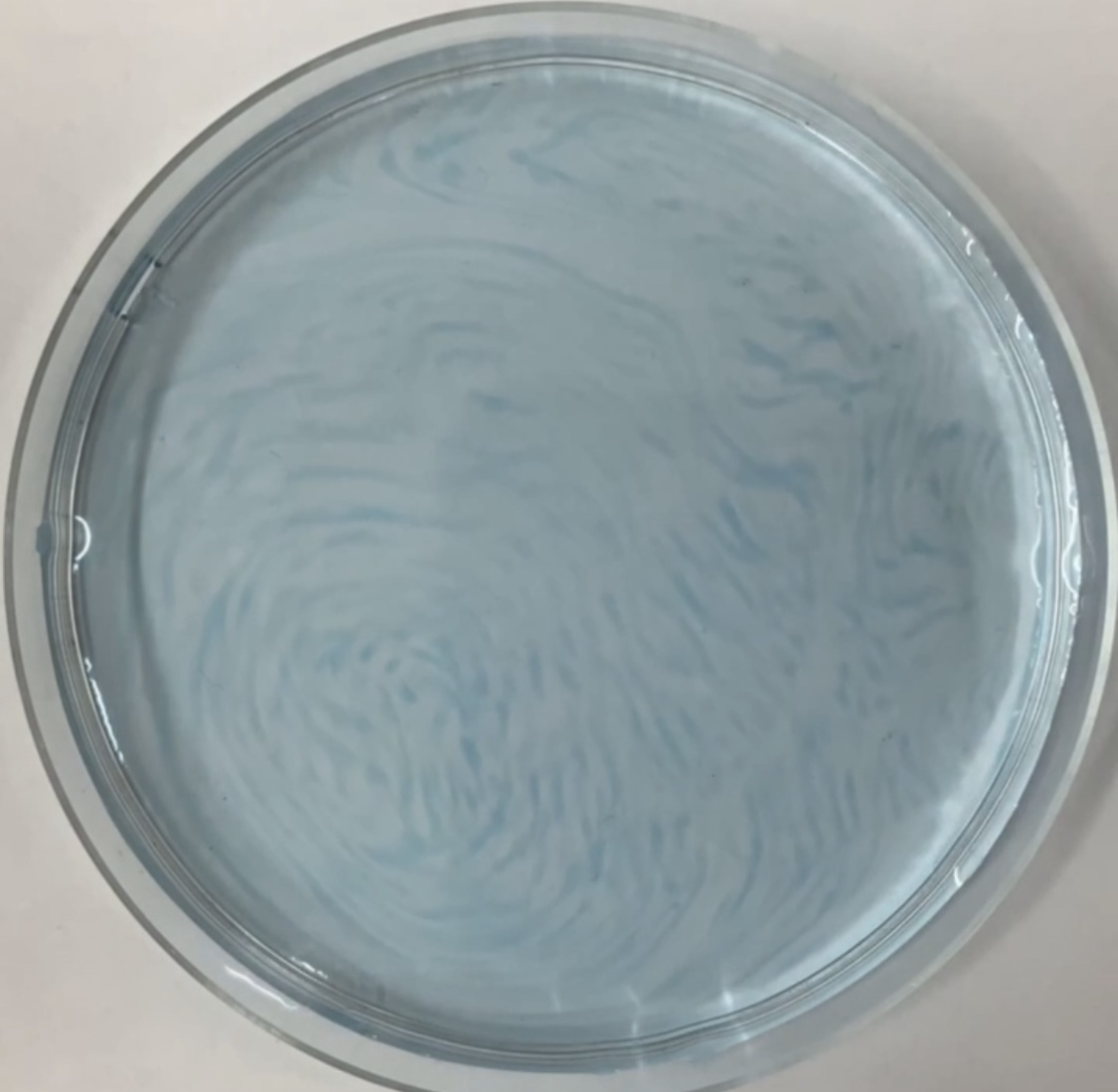
Pattern Formation from Blue Bottle Experiment in Room Temperature

Pattern Formation from Blue Bottle Experiment in Warm Water Bath Time-lapse

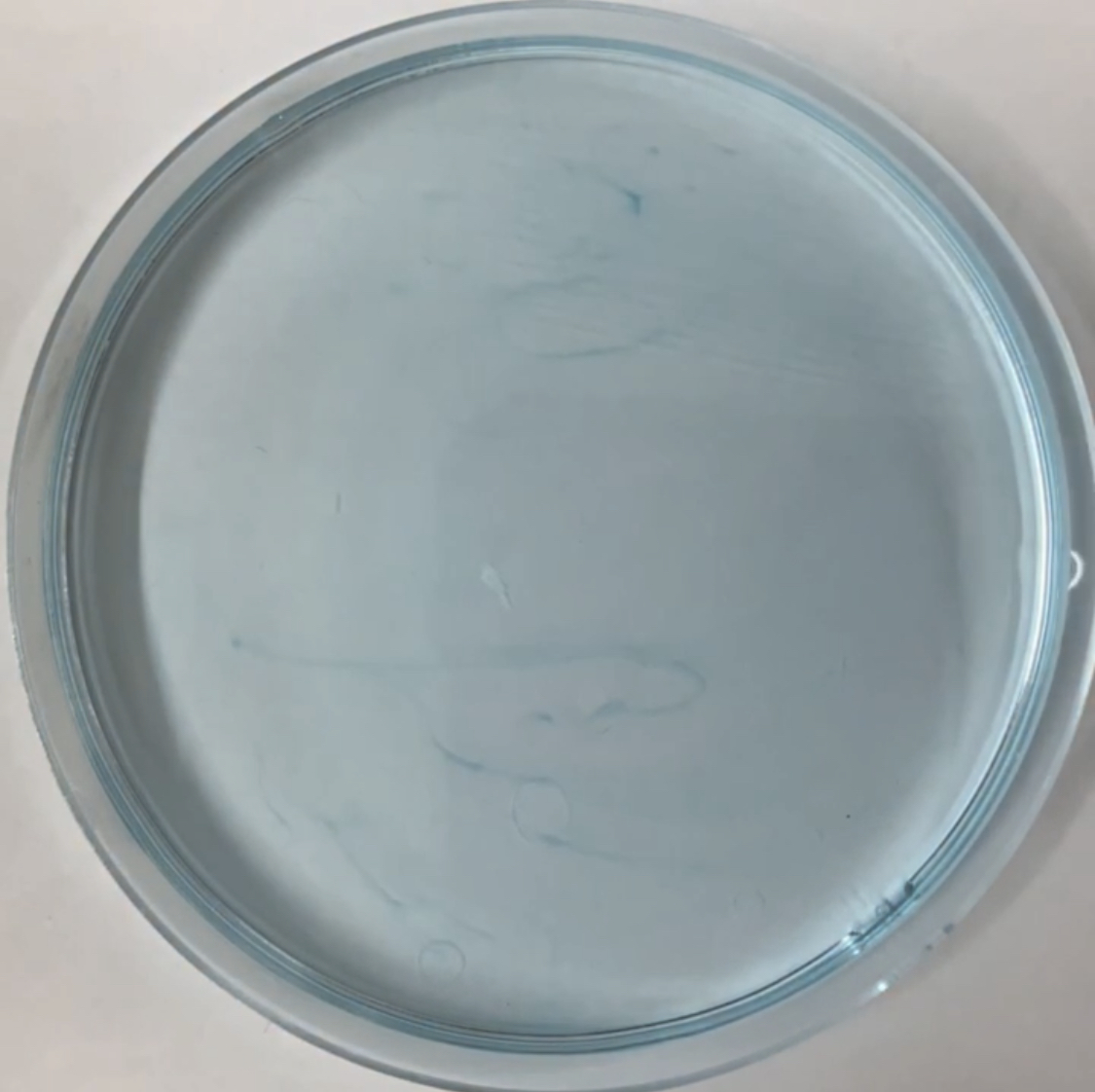
Pattern Formation from Blue Bottle Experiment in Warm Water Bath

Chemical Traffic Light Experiment Pattern Formation In Different Shape Containers Time-lapse

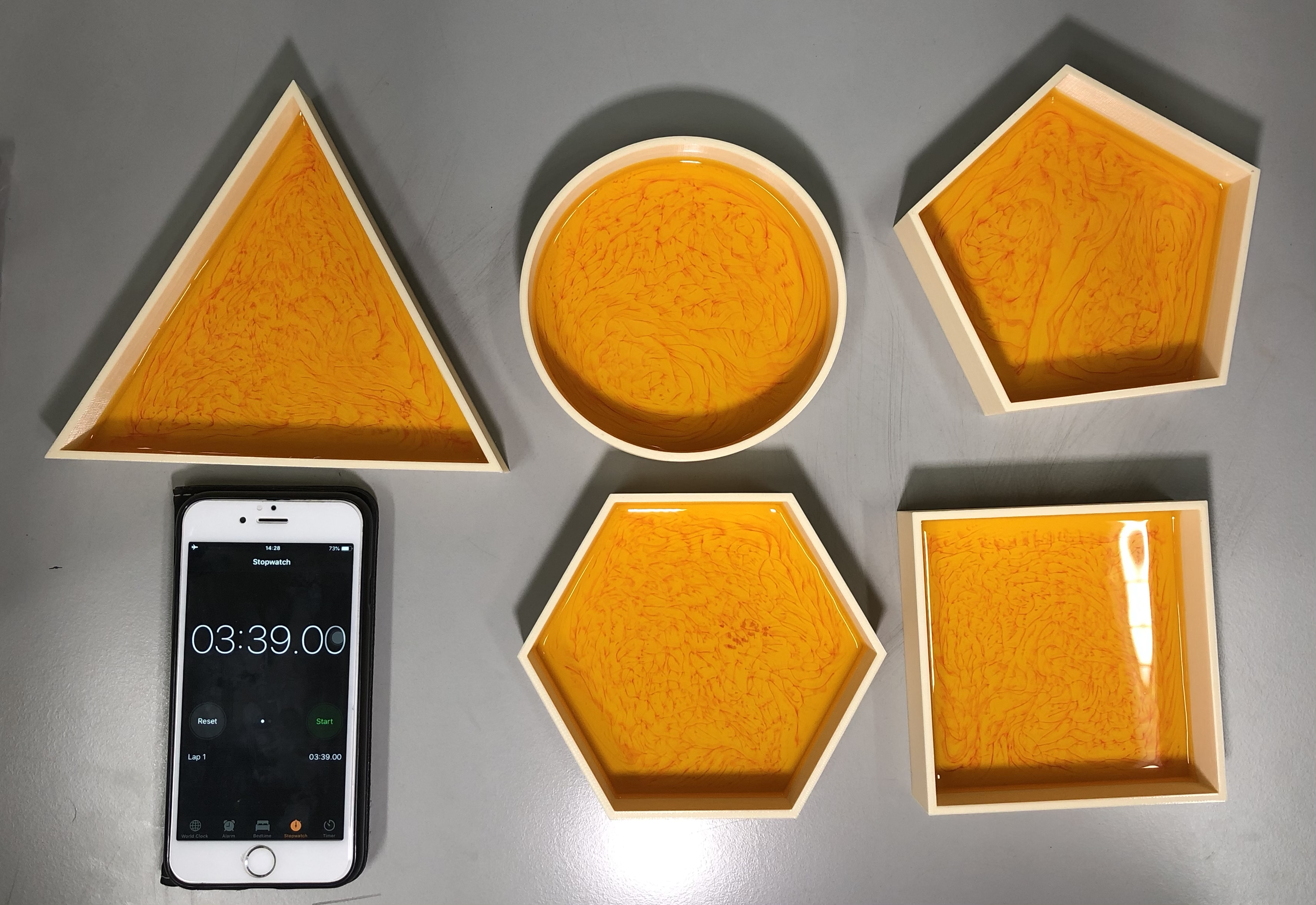
Chemical Traffic Light Experiment Pattern Formation In Different Shape Containers

A group of researchers of the University of Glasgow named Pons, Batiste and Bees came up with a small conclusion about pattern formation in the methylene blue-glucose system. They came up with a conclusive statement that a similar pattern can be formed in a container with accessible oxygen. This resulting surface tension effect isn't required to produce the instability. Small holes were also found in the lid of container that oxygen can't access resulting in a thin, blue, and lower amount of oxygen. Pattern length and time scale had been explored in one of their experiments due to the variation in viscosity and fluid depth. The experiment reveals that the wavelength is formed as a pattern starts to form quickly. Then wavelength or pattern can be maintained or oscillate for a while.
