= Timeline of the 2020 Thai protests (October 2020) =

== Early October ==
On 2 October, the Bad Student high school protest group organized protests at Bangkok high schools in Bangkok to protest against the abuse and mistreatment of school students, then assembled at the Ministry of Education to again call for the resignation of the Education Minister.

After no major events for nearly a month, on 13 October, the day before a planned demonstration date, a small group of protesters gathered at Ratchadamnoen Avenue near Democracy Monument, to protest the passing of the king's motorcade. Vajiralongkorn, who rarely returns to Thailand, was visiting to honor the fourth anniversary of his father's death. Twenty-one protesters were detained, and while the royal motorcade passed, others raised the three-finger Hunger Games salute, a notable incident of open dissent to the Thai monarchy. A hashtag insulting the king trended on Twitter.

== The motorcade incident ==
The planned protest rally on 14 October began at Democracy Monument, with the objective of moving to Government House to demand the resignation of Prayut. Both the United States Embassy and the United Nations in Bangkok warned their staff of an elevated risk, the latter due to the arrest of the 21 protesters the previous day. Authorities ordered "counter-protesters" to be trucked in using municipal vehicles, some of whom subsequently joined the protests. Right-wing groups, including the Thai Pakdee (Loyal Thais) and the Rubbish Collection Organization, launched counter-protests. Later in the day, tens of thousands of protesters, some under the umbrella of "Khana Ratsadorn 2563" (a reference to the historical People's Party), in a largely peaceful rally, marked by some violent assaults on the protesters by pro-royalists, marched to Government House and set up camps around it. The protest coincided with a planned royal progression around the city, which the protesters stated they would not impede and did not. Typically, roads on the royal motorcade's route are closed in advance by police. In this instance, however, the motorcade made no formal announcement, and the previously announced route was via another avenue. Protesters flashed the three-finger salute while chanting "Our taxes"—a reference to the monarchy's spending—and "Nation, Religion, People". Meanwhile, Prayut ordered legal actions against the protesters for allegedly blocking the motorcade, which included Queen Suthida and the heir-apparent Prince Dipangkorn Rasmijoti. According to Reuters, the demonstrators got close to the car but were "always behind police and none appeared to be trying to reach it". Anon accused the authorities of intentionally arranging the motorcade through the rally site. He gave an estimate of 2,000,000 participants before midnight.

== Severe state of emergency ==
On 15 October, the authorities declared a "severe" state of emergency in Bangkok from 04:00 local time and banned gatherings of five or more people. The protesters were cleared using riot police. In the process, police detained 20 demonstrators, among them three protest leaders, and imposed a ban on sensitive media stories. The government indicated it would set up a state-of-emergency command center. During the day, troops were dispatched to guard Government House and Parliament, raising alarm from an opposition member of parliament (MP) of resembling pre-2014 coup days. Opposition parties demanded the revoking of the Emergency Decree and an extraordinary session of Parliament. Two activists were arrested on the charge of attempting an “act of violence against the queen’s liberty”, an arcane law which incurs a possible life sentence, but eyewitnesses confirmed that they only shouted at the motorcade. Three senior policemen were transferred and investigated for the motorcade incident. A smaller planned occupation of at least 5,000 participants went ahead at 4pm at the Ratchaprasong intersection, where bloodshed occurred during the crackdown in 2010. Twenty more protesters were arrested, but the movement vowed to continue protesting with flash protest tactics. A legal aid group reported at least 51 people were arrested between 13 and 15 October.

== Crackdown at Patumwan Intersection ==
Police using water cannon to disperse protesters at Pathum Wan Intersection on 16 October.

On 16 October, the Thai cabinet confirmed a month-long state of emergency, reserving the right to impose a curfew and martial law. Prayut's remark of the protesters "don’t be careless, because people can die today, or tomorrow [...] Do not trifle with the powerful Grim Reaper," paraphrasing Buddha's teaching, was viewed by protesters as threatening the use of deadly force and as the actions of "a tyrant". Around 5,000 unarmed protesters, mostly teenagers, gathered at Pathum Wan Intersection, and two hours later were dispersed by the police. High-pressure water cannons with chemical-filled water and tear gas were used. The leader of the opposition Move Forward Party unsuccessfully asked police to evacuate the injured. The Commander of the Metropolitan Police reported at least 100 people were arrested. Protesters vowed to continue. Within hours of the crackdown, students from many universities nationwide held flash protests in response. Some right-wing personalities used an AFP video clip which showed a police officer in full riot gear being hit with pincers to question whether the protesters were unarmed. The blue colour dye in the water—speculated to be methylene blue, Azure A, or Thionine—was used to mark participants for potential arrest later. Protesters complained that the water contained a skin and eye irritant. The police could not confirm the exact type of chemicals deployed and were criticized for not appearing more curious about the chemicals they had purchased. The police said the chemicals were not dangerous and that they were following "international standards" for crowd control; however, Office of the United Nations High Commissioner for Human Rights guidance states water cannon should be used only against violent protests.

== The aftermath of the crackdown ==
Protests grew bigger afterwards as the leaders adjusted and held demonstrations at multiple locations on short notice, giving police less opportunity to coordinate a response. On 17 October, an estimated 5,000 participants held rallies mainly at three different sites in Bangkok and several smaller sites, despite the government-ordered shutdown of the MRT and BTS rapid transit systems, which affected hundreds of thousands of commuters. Protests were also held in at least six other provinces. Two demonstrators who were charged with attempting "violence against the queen’s liberty" were granted bail. On 18 October, according to police figures, approximately 4,000 protesters demonstrated at Victory Monument, with over 2,000 attending rallies at two Bangkok intersections; protests continued in several provinces. On 19 October, crowds gathered at three locations in the northern suburbs of Bangkok, including outside Bangkok Remand Prison, where many activists arrested for involvement in the protest were detained. Two demands were also presented to the government, asking for the release of activists without persecution and for the emergency decree to be revoked within 24 hours. On 20 October, after the government threatened to shut down Facebook pages and Telegram, the leading group of the protesters, the Free Youth, announced a 'big surprise' for 6pm, which was revealed to be that protesters would take a break.

External videos
- Assault of student protesters at Ramkhamhaeng University 21 October 2020, Twitter video

On 21 October, a pro-government Facebook page posted pictures of a parade of bureaucrats expressing allegiance to the King. In a televised evening speech on 21 October, Prayut suggested that both sides de-escalate and reconcile their differences through the parliamentary process. He offered to promptly lift the state of severe emergency in Bangkok if there was no further violence and asked the protesters to tone down the level of their rhetoric. After gathering earlier in the day at Victory Monument, thousands marched the 4 km (2 mi) to Government House and delivered a resignation letter for Prayut to sign, pledging to back off if he resigned within three days and dismissed all legal action against the protest leaders. On the same day, the protesters and a group of royalist counter-protesters wearing yellow shirts clashed at Ramkhamhaeng University, when the latter crossed the police line and attacked the former, resulting in one injured student and a prosecution report. The following day, Prayut revoked the severe emergency declaration, on the grounds that the severity of the situation had lessened.

== Extraordinary session ==
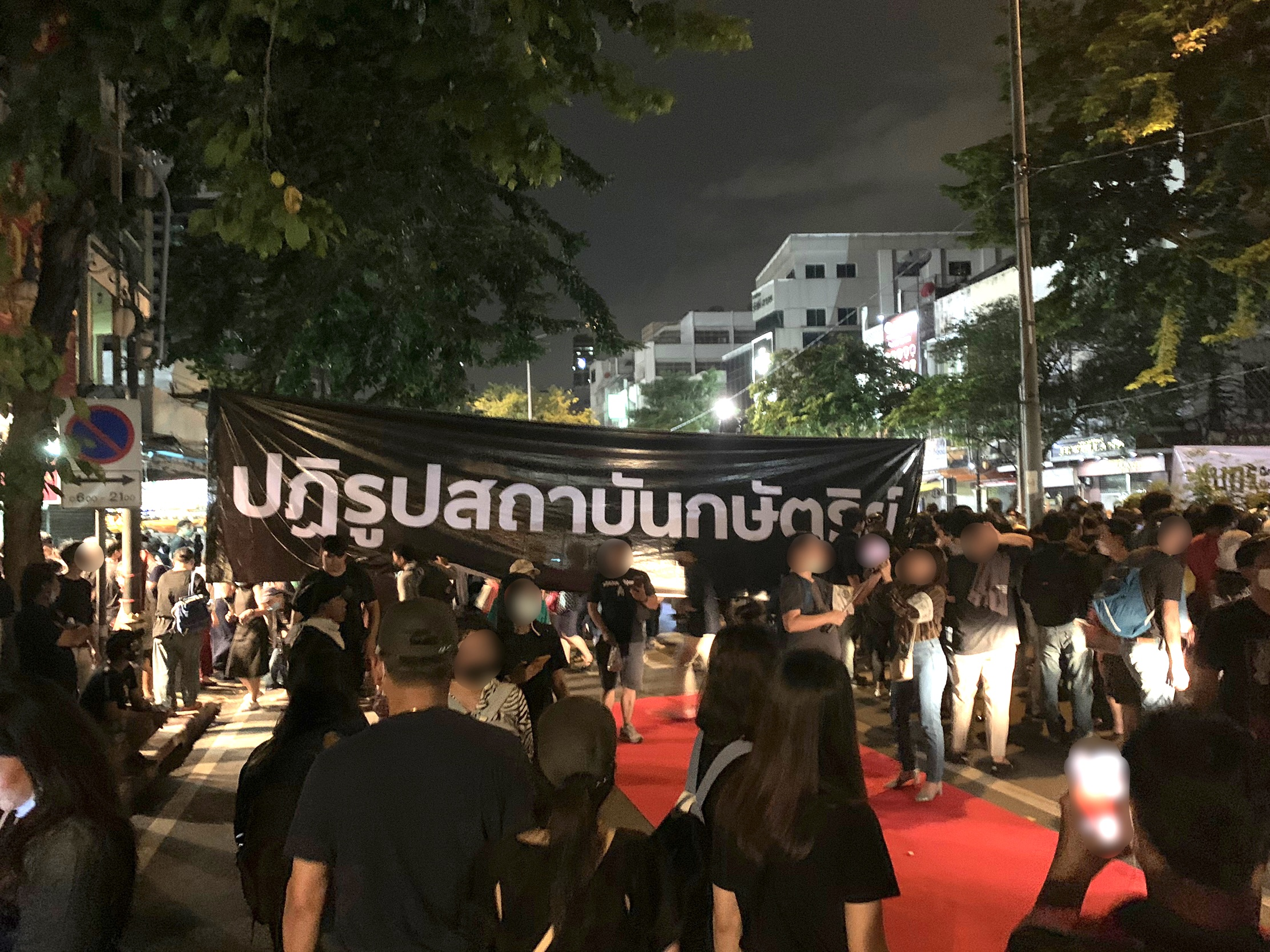
A banner reading “Reform the monarchy” on Silom Road, Bangkok

On 24 October, after Prayut did not resign, leading movement protesters vowed to recommence street actions; Prayut scheduled an emergency parliamentary session for 26–27 October. Protesters did not trust his plan to amend the constitution and preferred that the government show good faith and resign before advocating for amendments. The non-voting government sessions tabled three items on the agenda, none of which were addressed the protesters' concerns. Sompong Amornwiwat of the Pheu Thai Party, the country's largest opposition party, asked Prayut to resign, while the Move Forward Party accused the prime minister of utilizing the royal motorcade incident to blame the protesters. Palang Pracharath Party member Paiboon Nititawan defended the prime minister, citing his leadership during the economic crisis and his protection of the monarchy. In addition, Seri Ruam Thai Party chairman Sereepisut Temiyavet walked out after House Speaker Chuan Leekpai insisted that he withdraw his use of the term "I Hear Too", a vulgar reference to the prime minister's nickname, Tuu. As a result, Prayut said that the government would present a Constitutional amendment bill and a committee to resolve the political conflict would be set up, however, Bangkok Post opined that it failed to reach any resolutions to the situation.

On 26 October, protesters marched to the German Embassy in Bangkok, petitioning the German government to investigate the King's activities in Germany, including whether or not he had violated German sovereignty by exercising powers from German soil. Earlier in the day, yellow-shirted monarchy supporters assembled at the embassy in advance of the planned rally and submitted a letter signed by the pro-royalist People of Thailand group to an official. On 27 October, over 1,000 people dressed mostly in yellow demonstrated in support of the King at Lumphini Park in central Bangkok. Demonstrations by royalists have been smaller than the tens of thousands at the largest pro-democracy protests.

On 29 October, protests at Sri Mariamman Temple in Bangkok's Si Lom district satirized the fashion business of the King's daughter Princess Sirivannavari Nariratana, whose brand reportedly received 13 million baht from the Ministry of Commerce budget.

On 30 October, after the release of three protest leaders, the police from another province immediately detained them further, prompting the flash protest outside the police station where they were kept.

On 31 October, AFP released a fact-check article to debunk an idea that the German Foreign Minister said the Thai King did no wrong.
