= Food Blue 2 =

Food Blue 2 may refer to:

- Indigo carmine, a food colorant also known as FD&C Blue 2
- Brilliant blue FCF, a food colorant also known as CI Food Blue 2, more commonly known as FD&C Blue 1
