= Matilda Moldenhauer Brooks =

American cell biologist

- Brooks, before 1927
- Born: 1888
- Died: 1981 (aged 92–93)
- Education: Harvard University
- Known for: Discovering that methylene blue is an antidote to carbon monoxide and cyanide poisoning
- Spouse: Sumner Cushing Brooks
- Scientific career
- Fields: Biology, cell biology
- Workplaces: United States Public Health Service, University of California, Berkeley
- Thesis: Quantitative studies on the respiration of Bacillus subtilis (Ehrenberg) Cohn (1920)

Matilda Moldenhauer Brooks (1888–1981) was a cellular biologist best known for her 1932 discovery that the staining compound methylene blue is an antidote to carbon monoxide and cyanide poisoning. She held a PhD in zoology and spent her professional career working as a researcher at the United States Public Health Service and the University of California, Berkeley.

== Education ==
Brooks earned her BS and MS at the University of Pittsburgh, where she was a member of Kappa Alpha Theta, and her PhD in zoology from Harvard University in 1920.

== Career ==
=== United States Public Health Service ===
Brooks conducted joint research projects with her husband, biologist Sumner Cushing Brooks. They worked together for the United States Public Health Service from 1920 to 1927.

=== University of California, Berkeley ===
In 1927, Sumner Brooks was offered a faculty position in Zoology at the University of California, Berkeley, to teach physicochemical biology, becoming the first person at Berkeley to teach classroom and lab courses in experimental cell biology. When her husband had taken up his faculty post, Matilda had been barred from a paying job by Berkeley's anti-nepotism policy and allowed only a non-paying appointment. Thereafter she was described as being on the research staff at Berkeley, where she continued publishing her own papers and collaborating with her husband for 20 years.

Methylene blue potential as an antidote

In 1932, during Brooks time at the University of California, she discovered that methylene blue can serve as an antidote to oxygen deprivation, hypoxia, caused by some poisons. These poisons include carbon monoxide and cyanide, both cellular poisons that disrupt oxygen availability to the body causing similar symptoms of dizziness and headaches. This drug can serve as a catalyst and improve oxygen absorption by red blood cells, allowing the body to access the limited oxygen supply.

To verify her discovery, Brooks took medical students up to an altitude of 15,000 feet where soroche , altitude sickness, would be a concern. She gave me them methylene blue capsules and as a result no one was sick from altitude sickness. This gave her the idea that methylene blue would be useful for high altitude flyers.

==== Lawsuit for recovery of professional expenses ====
When Sumner Brooks died in 1948, Matilda was left with a lab and some small grants at Berkeley but no salary, the result of the university's anti-nepotism policy, which had barred her from a paying job when her husband had accepted his faculty post. Berkeley then offered Matilda a stipend of $500 a year to continue on.

By drawing on personal savings and investments, plus the small research grants, Brooks was able to continue her career on the meager stipend. In 1952 and 1953, she made trips to Europe furthering scientific aims, claiming expenses of $2,988 and $3,685, respectively, incurred during the travel. These deductions were denied on her Federal income tax by the Internal Revenue Service. Brooks then took the matter to Tax Court, but lost.

She appealed the decision with the Ninth Circuit, U.S. Court of Appeals. In Matilda M. Brooks v. Commissioner of Internal Revenue, she argued that even though she couldn't hope to earn a living from publishing scientific papers alone, she would profit professionally by gathering materials and conferring with peers to preserve her academic reputation during European travel. In 1959 Justice Stanley M. Barnes held in favor of Brooks and reversed the lower court decision, writing: "It is difficult in view of mankind’s almost universal drive for monetary reward alone to recognize that petitioner was required to spend many thousands of dollars to retain the position paying her but $500 per annum."

== Activism ==
In 1933, Brooks published a rejoinder in JAMA after a previous paper by a male physician reported successful treatments of cyanide poisoning with methylene blue omitted the fact that Brooks had published her discovery the year before.

In June 1936, Brooks wrote to the Board of Trustees of Mount Holyoke College. "May I add my voice of protest to that of the others against the appointment of a man as head of Mt. Holyoke College? The education of women has progressed a long way from the time when they were allowed to sit out of sight behind curtains to listen to the words of wisdom which proceeded from the mouths of men instructors... It seems to me that in this modern age when there are so many able women in this country, educated and trained for leadership among not only women, but also men, that it is a very curious reactionary decision on the part of those in power, to revert to the age-old custom of considering a man as the only one able to head a group of women."

== Personal life ==
Brooks met her husband, Sumner Cushing Brooks, in 1916 in Cambridge, Massachusetts, where she was working on her PhD in zoology at Harvard and he had just finished his in botany. The couple married in 1917. His father was the American agricultural scientist William P. Brooks who served as the president of both Hokkaido University and the University of Massachusetts Amherst. Together, the couple conducted numerous joint research projects and went on to coauthor works such as The Permeability of Living Cells.

== Selected works ==
- 1944, with Sumner Cushing Brooks, The permeability of living cells. Ann Arbor, MI: J.W. Edwards, Incorporated. OCLC 5136643
