= Methylene blue =

Blue dye also used as a medication

Methylene blue INN: Methylthioninium chloride
- Molecular structure

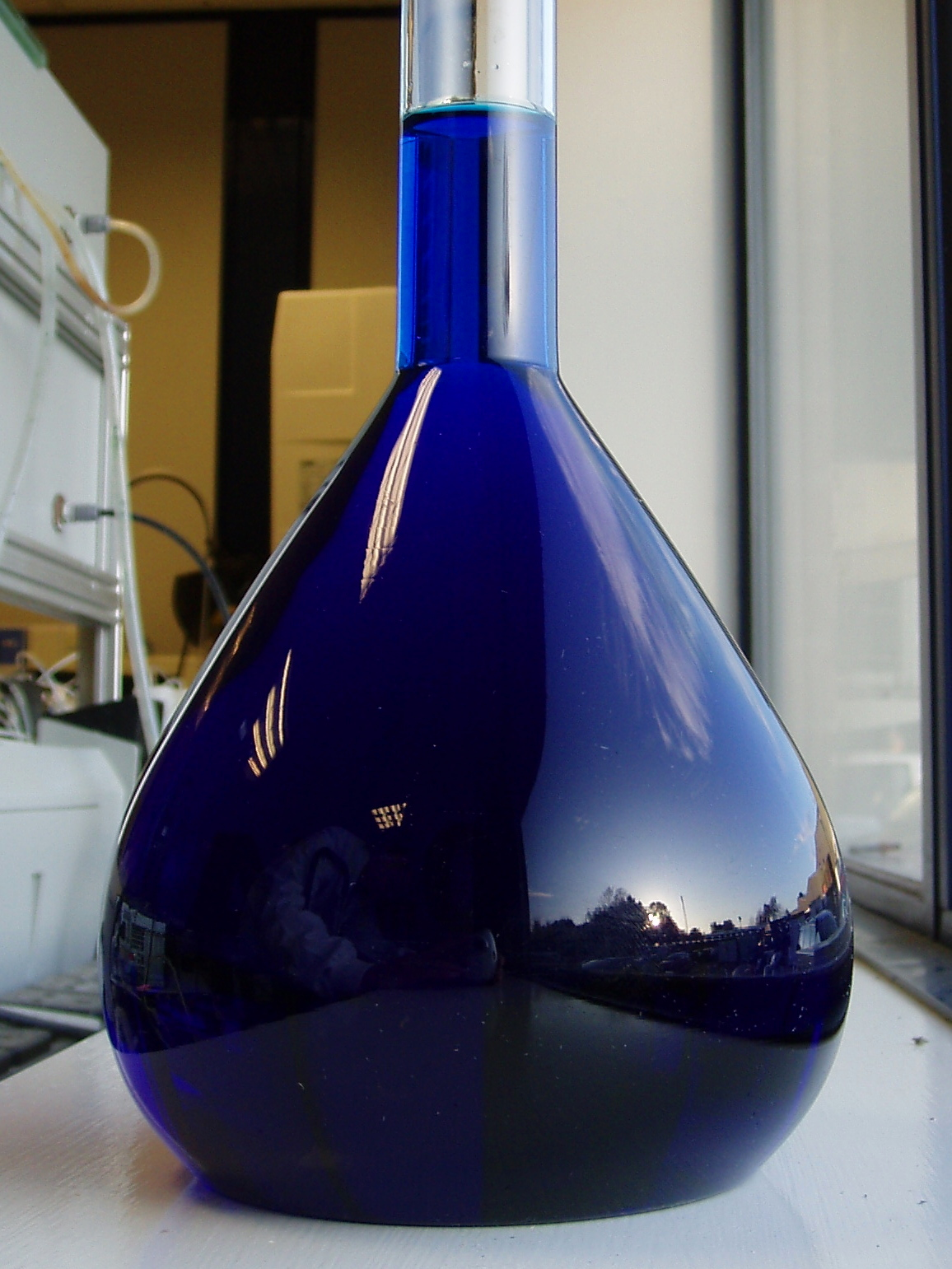
- A volumetric flask of a methylene blue solution

Clinical data
- Trade names: Urelene blue, Provayblue, Proveblue, others
- AHFS/Drugs.com: Monograph
- License data: US DailyMed: Provayblue
- Pregnancy category: AU: D
- Routes of administration: By mouth, intravenous
- Drug class: Phenothiazine; monoamine oxidase inhibitor
- ATC code: V03AB17 (WHO) V04CG05 (WHO)

Legal status
- Legal status: US: ℞-only; EU: Rx-only

Pharmacokinetic data
- Elimination half-life: 5–24 hours (IV)
- Excretion: Renal; In rats: 18%(PO), 28% (IV)

Identifiers
- IUPAC name: 3,7-bis(Dimethylamino)-phenothiazin-5-ium chloride
- CAS Number: 61-73-4
- PubChem CID: 6099
- DrugBank: DB09241
- ChemSpider: 5874
- UNII: 8NAP7826UB
- KEGG: D10537; C00220
- ChEBI: CHEBI:6872
- ChEMBL: ChEMBL405110
- CompTox Dashboard (EPA): DTXSID0023296
- ECHA InfoCard: 100.000.469

Chemical and physical data
- Formula: C_{16}H_{18}ClN_{3}S
- Molar mass: 319.85 g·mol^{−1}
- 3D model (JSmol): Interactive image
- SMILES: CN(C)c1ccc2c(c1)sc-3cc(=[N+](C)C)ccc3n2.[Cl-]
- InChI: InChI=1S/C16H18N3S.ClH/c1-18(2)11-5-7-13-15(9-11)20-16-10-12(19(3)4)6-8-14(16)17-13;/h5-10H,1-4H3;1H/q+1;/p-1; Key:CXKWCBBOMKCUKX-UHFFFAOYSA-M

Methylthioninium chloride, commonly called methylene blue, is a salt used as a dye and as a medication. As a medication, it is mainly used to treat methemoglobinemia. It has previously been used for treating cyanide poisoning and urinary tract infections, but this use is no longer recommended. It has also been used to treat cases of malaria for more than a century.

Methylene blue is typically given by injection into a vein. Common side effects include headache, nausea, and vomiting.

Methylene blue (zinc double chloride salt) was first prepared in 1876, by Heinrich Caro. It is on the World Health Organization's List of Essential Medicines.

In recent years, methylene blue has been promoted for various health effects, but outside its established medical use, its safety and effectiveness are unproven; it is potentially toxic and should only be used under a doctor's prescription.

== Medical uses ==
=== Alzheimer's disease ===
A 2008 clinical trial tested methylene blue (under the brand name "Rember") against a placebo in 321 people with Alzheimer's disease across the UK and Singapore.

=== Methemoglobinemia ===
Methylene blue is used to treat methemoglobinemia by chemically reducing the ferric iron in hemoglobin to ferrous iron. Methemoglobinemia can arise from ingestion of certain pharmaceuticals, toxins, or broad beans in those susceptible. Specifically, it is used to treat methemoglobin levels that are greater than 30% or in which there are symptoms despite oxygen therapy. Normally, through the NADH- or NADPH-dependent methemoglobin reductase enzymes, methemoglobin is reduced back to hemoglobin. When large amounts of methemoglobin occur secondary to toxins, methemoglobin reductases are overwhelmed. Methylene blue, when injected intravenously as an antidote, is itself first reduced to leucomethylene blue, which then reduces the heme group from methemoglobin to hemoglobin. Methylene blue can reduce the half-life of methemoglobin from hours to minutes. At high doses, however, methylene blue actually induces methemoglobinemia, reversing this pathway.

Methylene blue is indicated for treating sodium nitrite overdoses, in particular when sodium nitrite is used as part of a suicide attempt.

==== Isobutyl nitrite toxicity ====
Isobutyl nitrite is one of the compounds used as poppers, an inhalant drug that induces a brief euphoria.

Isobutyl nitrite is known to cause methemoglobinemia. Severe methemoglobinemia may be treated with methylene blue.

=== In a combination drug: Methylphen ===
Hyoscyamine/hexamethylenetetramine/phenyl salicylate/methylene blue/benzoic acid is a combination drug used to treat pain caused by urinary tract infections and spasms of the urinary tract. It is currently sold under multiple brand names in the US, eg. Hyophen, Methylphen, Urophen, Urised. It was formerly sold as Prosed/DS, but this particular brand name was discontinued.

- Hyoscyamine
- Hexamethylenetetramine
- Phenyl salicylate
- Methylene blue
- Benzoic acid

=== Cyanide poisoning ===
Since its reduction potential is similar to that of oxygen and can be reduced by components of the electron transport chain, large doses of methylene blue are sometimes used as an antidote for cyanide poisoning, a method first successfully tested in 1933 by Matilda Moldenhauer Brooks in San Francisco, although first demonstrated by Bo Sahlin of Lund University, in 1926.

=== Shock ===
Methylene blue increases blood pressure in people with vasoplegic syndrome (redistributive shock). It does not improve delivery of oxygen to tissues or decrease mortality.

Methylene blue has been used in calcium channel blocker toxicity as a possible rescue therapy for distributive shock unresponsive to first-line agents. Limited to case reports, a 2024 review found low-quality evidence that methylene blue may reduce short-term mortality, duration of the need for vasopressors, and length of hospital stay.

=== Dye or stain ===
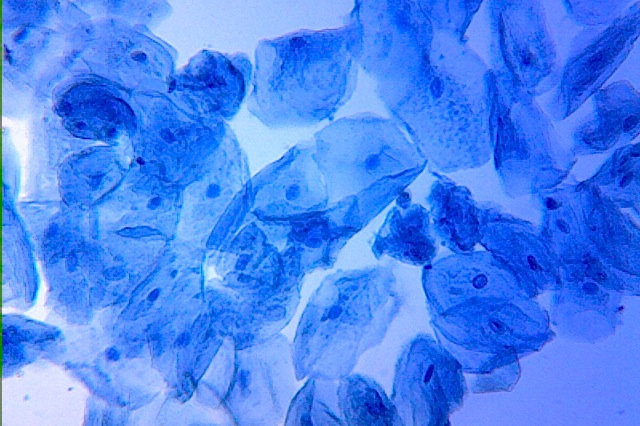
Human cheek cells stained with methylene blue

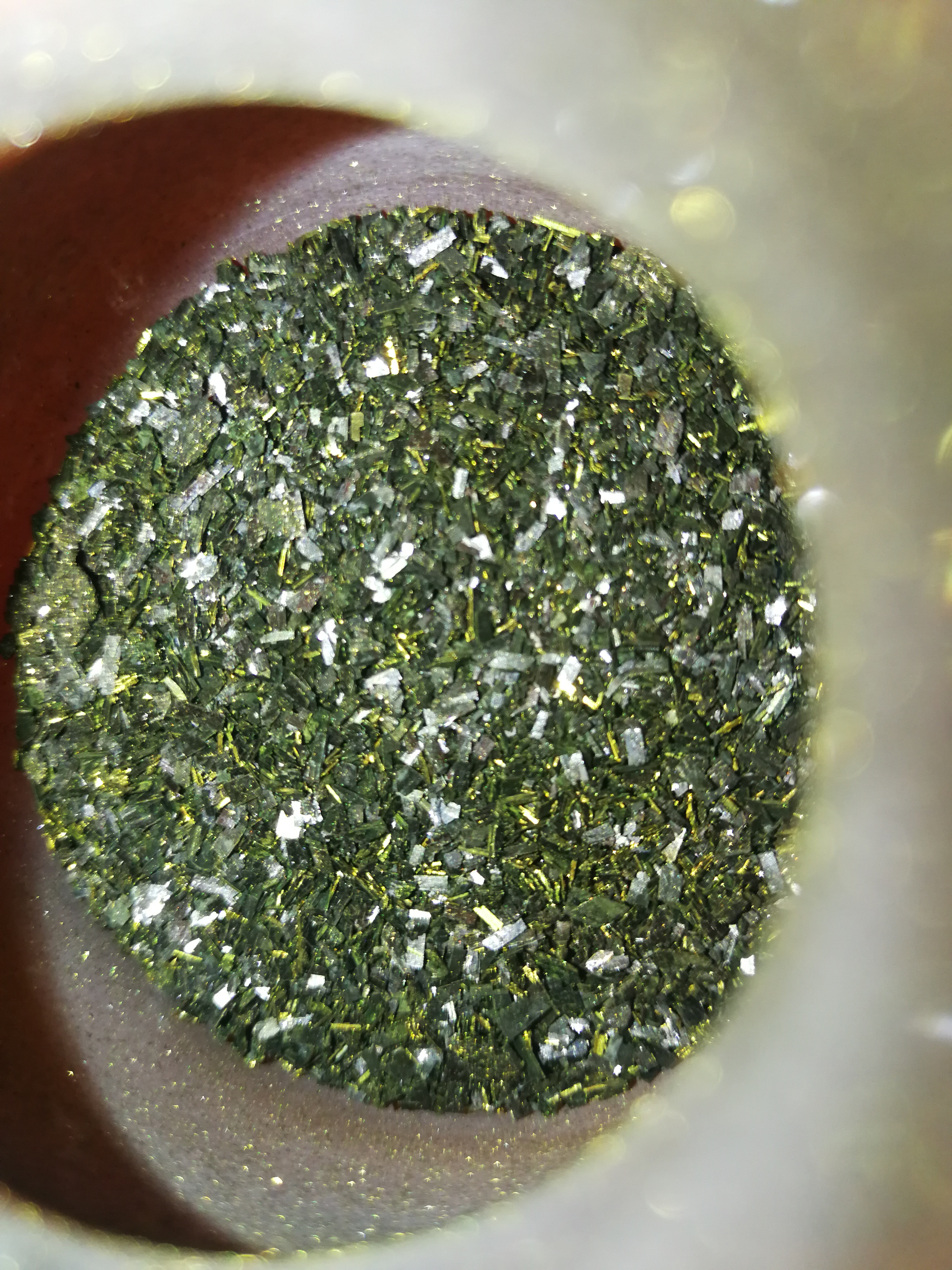
Methylene blue crystals

Methylene blue is used in endoscopic polypectomy as an adjunct to saline or epinephrine, and is used for injection into the submucosa around the polyp to be removed. This allows the submucosal tissue plane to be identified after the polyp is removed, which is useful in determining if more tissue needs to be removed or if there is a high risk for perforation. Methylene blue is also used as a dye in chromoendoscopy, and is sprayed onto the mucosa of the gastrointestinal tract to identify dysplasia, or pre-cancerous lesions. Intravenously injected methylene blue is readily released into the urine.

In surgeries such as sentinel lymph node dissections, methylene blue can be used to visually trace the lymphatic drainage of tested tissues. Similarly, methylene blue is added to bone cement in orthopedic operations to provide easy discrimination between native bone and cement. Additionally, methylene blue accelerates the hardening of bone cement, increasing the speed at which bone cement can be effectively applied. Methylene blue is used as an aid to visualisation/orientation in several medical devices, including a surgical sealant film. It can also be used during gastrointestinal surgeries (such as bowel resection or gastric bypass) to test for leaks.

It is sometimes used in cytopathology, in mixtures including Wright-Giemsa and Diff-Quik. It confers a blue color to both nuclei and cytoplasm, and makes the nuclei more visible. When methylene blue is "polychromed" (oxidized in solution or "ripened" by fungal metabolism, as originally noted in the thesis of Dr. D. L. Romanowsky in the 1890s), it gets serially demethylated and forms all the tri-, di-, mono- and non-methyl intermediates, which are Azure B, Azure A, Azure C, and thionine, respectively. This is the basis of the basophilic part of the spectrum of Romanowski-Giemsa effect. If only synthetic Azure B and Eosin Y is used, it may serve as a standardized Giemsa stain; but, without methylene blue, the normal neutrophilic granules tend to overstain and look like toxic granules. On the other hand, if methylene blue is used it might help to give the normal look of neutrophil granules and may also enhance the staining of nucleoli and polychromatophilic RBCs (reticulocytes).

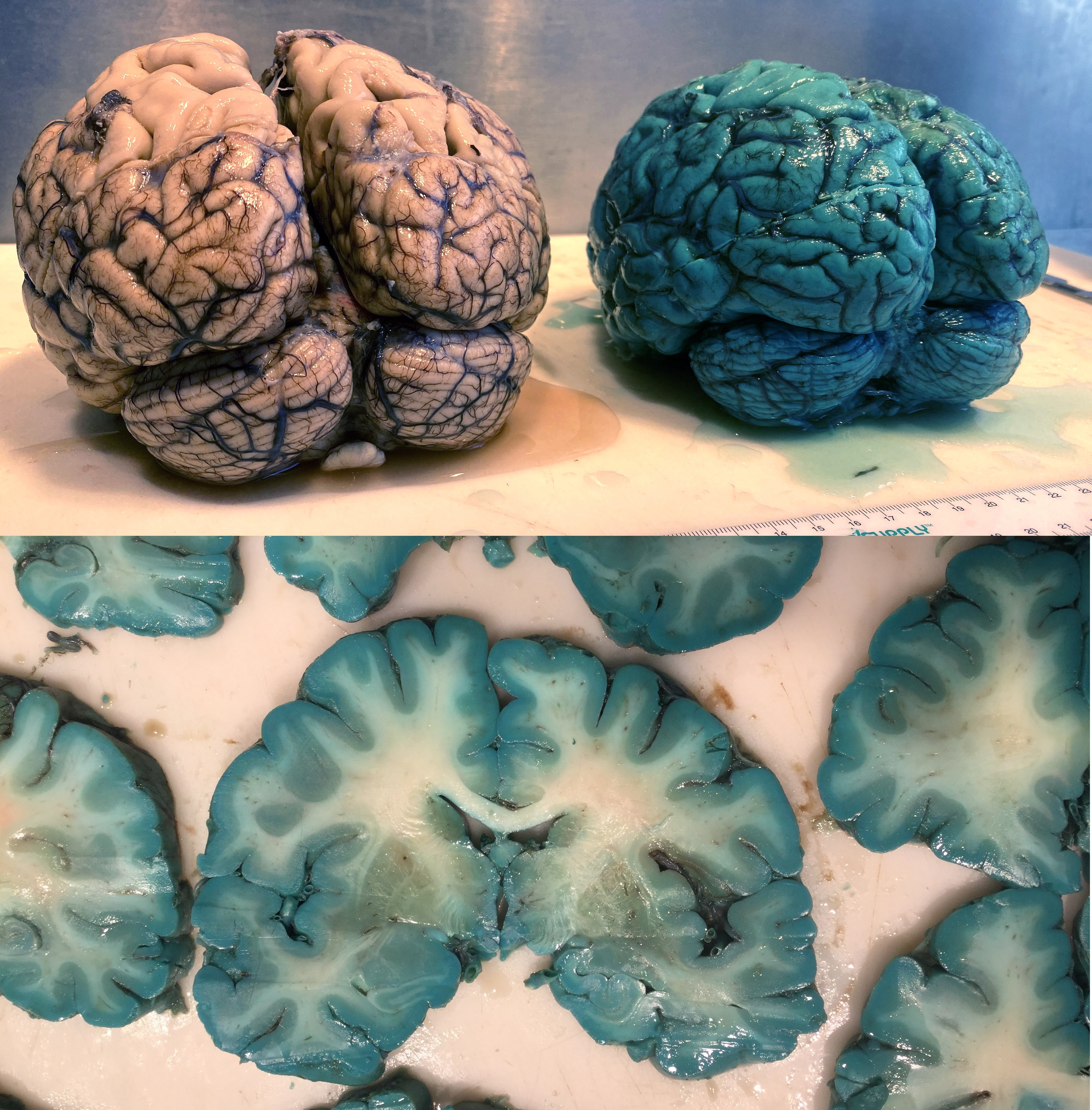
Gross pathology of a normal brain and a brain of a patient treated with methylene blue before death.

A traditional application of methylene blue is the intravital or supravital staining of nerve fibers, an effect first described by Paul Ehrlich in 1887. A dilute solution of the dye is either injected into tissue or applied to small freshly removed pieces. The selective blue coloration develops with exposure to air (oxygen) and can be fixed by immersion of the stained specimen in an aqueous solution of ammonium molybdate. Vital methylene blue was formerly much used for examining the innervation of muscle, skin, and internal organs. The mechanism of selective dye uptake is incompletely understood; vital staining of nerve fibers in skin is prevented by ouabain, a drug that inhibits the Na/K-ATPase of cell membranes.

=== Placebo ===
Methylene blue has been used as a placebo; physicians would tell their patients to expect their urine to change color and view this as a sign that their condition had improved. This same side effect makes methylene blue difficult to use in traditional placebo-controlled clinical studies, including those testing for its efficacy as a treatment. One approach is to use a low dose, just enough to turn urine blue, as the placebo group. However, a low dose does not guarantee inertness.

== Side effects ==
Cardiovascular	Central nervous system	Dermatologic	Gastrointestinal	Genito-urinary	Hematologic
Hypertension; Precordial pain	Dizziness; Mental confusion; Headache; Fever	Staining of skin; Injection site necrosis (SC)	Fecal discoloration; Nausea; Vomiting; Abdominal pain	Discoloration of urine (doses over 80 μg); Bladder irritation	Anemia

Methylene blue is a monoamine oxidase inhibitor (MAOI) and, if infused intravenously at doses exceeding 5 mg/kg, may result in serotonin syndrome if combined with any selective serotonin reuptake inhibitors (SSRIs) or other serotonergic drugs (e.g., duloxetine, sibutramine, venlafaxine, clomipramine, imipramine).

It causes hemolytic anemia in carriers of the G6PD enzymatic deficiency (favism). The actual degree of this danger is a subject of controversy as the association was made based on very few cases. A 2018 meta-analysis on clinical trials against malaria in Africa, where the moderate A minus type of G6PD deficiency is prevalent, shows no association between MB and hemolysis in such patients. There was, however, a clinically insignificant reduction in hemoglobin.

== Pregnancy ==
While use during pregnancy may harm the fetus, not using it in methemoglobinemia is likely more dangerous.

== Pharmacokinetics ==
After intravenous administration in humans, methylene blue shows a multiphasic change in concentration, with a terminal half-life of 5.25 hours. The initial disappearance from blood actually reflects its movement into organs, with brain, liver, and bile all showing significantly higher concentrations than blood in rats. The overall area under the curve in oral (dry gelatin capsule) administration is only 6.5% of the AUC for IV administration; judging from rat studies, the significantly altered organ distribution plays a key role in this difference.

Administration as an oral solution (500 mg in 200 mL) greatly increases the bioavailability to 72.3±23.9%. In this newer study, the terminal half-lives were reported as 18.5±11.8 hours for IV use and 18.3±7.2 hours for oral use. The t_{max} for oral use is 2.2 hours, compared to 0.5 hours for iv use.

== Chemistry ==
Methylene blue is a formal derivative of phenothiazine. It is a dark green powder that yields a blue solution in water. The hydrated form has 3 molecules of water per unit of methylene blue.

=== Preparation ===
This compound is prepared by oxidation of 4-aminodimethylaniline in the presence of sodium thiosulfate to give the quinonediiminothiosulfonic acid, reaction with dimethylaniline, oxidation to the indamine, and cyclization to give the thiazine:

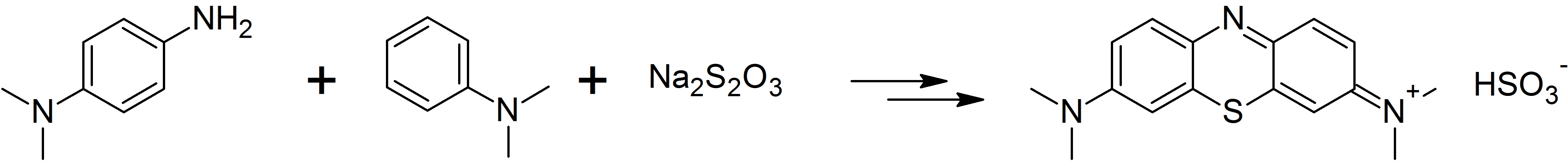

A green electrochemical procedure, using only dimethyl-4-phenylenediamine and sulfide ions has been proposed.

=== Light absorption properties ===
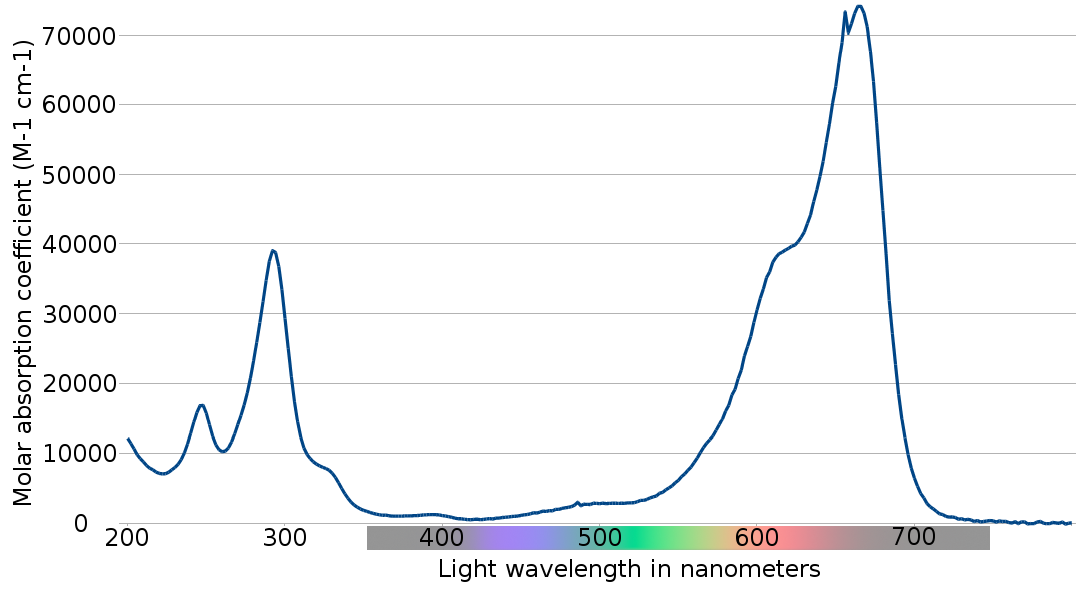
Absorption spectrum of methylene blue, in terms of the molar extinction coefficient (base 10 logarithm). In this dataset, a peak absorbance of 1.7 (i.e., 98% of transmitted light absorbed) was observed with 665 nm light passing through 1 cm of 10 micromolar methylene blue solution.

The maximum absorption of light is near 670 nm. The specifics of absorption depend on several factors, including protonation, adsorption to other materials, and metachromasy – the formation of dimers and higher-order aggregates depending on concentration and other interactions:

Species	Absorption peak	Extinction coefficient (dm^{3}/mol·cm)
MB^{+} (solution)	664	95000
MBH_{2}^{+} (solution)	741	76000
(MB^{+})_{2} (solution)	605	132000
(MB^{+})_{3} (solution)	580	110000
MB^{+} (adsorbed on clay)	673	116000
MBH_{2}^{+} (adsorbed on clay)	763	86000
(MB^{+})_{2} (adsorbed on clay)	596	80000
(MB^{+})_{3} (adsorbed on clay)	570	114000

=== Redox properties ===
Reversible reduction of methylene blue

Under reducing conditions, the blue-colored methylene blue cation (MB^{+}) gains 1H^{+} and 2e^{−} to become the electrically neutral and colorless leucomethylene blue (LMB). The redox midpoint potential E_{0}' is +0.01 V.

The redox properties can be seen in a classical demonstration of chemical kinetics in general chemistry, the "blue bottle" experiment. Typically, a solution is made of glucose (dextrose), methylene blue, and sodium hydroxide. Upon shaking the bottle, oxygen oxidizes methylene blue, and the solution turns blue. The dextrose will gradually reduce the methylene blue to its colorless, reduced form. Hence, when the dissolved dextrose is entirely consumed, the solution will turn blue again.

In the mitochondrial electron transport chain, reduced methylene blue (MBH_{2}) directly reduces cytochrome c rather than to oxygen, limiting the formation of superoxide. Methylene blue has been shown to directly accept electrons from NADH, NADPH, and FADH_{2}.

== Other uses ==
=== Redox indicator ===
Methylene blue is widely used as a redox indicator in analytical chemistry. Solutions of this substance are blue when in an oxidizing environment, but will turn colorless if exposed to a reducing agent.

=== Photosensitizer ===
Methylene blue is also a photosensitizer used to create singlet oxygen when exposed to both oxygen and light. It is used in this regard to make organic peroxides by a Diels-Alder reaction which is spin forbidden with normal atmospheric triplet oxygen.

With the help of light, methylene blue can be used to kill some viruses and some bacteria. This kind of photo-disinfection has also been done inside of human bodies (antimicrobial photodynamic therapy). The same process can also be used to disinfect blood plasma.

Methylene blue is theoretically also applicable to other forms of photodynamic therapy, i.e., the use of oxygen, light, and a photosensitizer to kill cells. Research on using it to kill cancer cells locally is in a preclinical stage. Its cytotoxicity may be related to its ability to inhibit tubulin polymerization.

=== Sulfide analysis ===
The formation of methylene blue after the reaction of hydrogen sulfide with dimethyl-p-phenylenediamine and iron(III) at pH 0.4 – 0.7 is used to determine by photometric measurements sulfide concentration in the range 0.020 to 1.50 mg/L (20 ppb to 1.5 ppm). The test is very sensitive and the blue coloration developing upon contact of the reagents with dissolved H_{2}S is stable for 60 min. Ready-to-use kits such as the Spectroquant sulfide test facilitate routine analyses. The methylene blue sulfide test is a convenient method often used in soil microbiology to quickly detect in water the metabolic activity of sulfate reducing bacteria (SRB). In this colorimetric test, methylene blue is a product formed by the reaction and not a reagent added to the system.

The addition of a strong reducing agent, such as ascorbic acid, to a sulfide-containing solution is sometimes used to prevent sulfide oxidation from atmospheric oxygen. Although it is certainly a sound precaution for the determination of sulfide with an ion selective electrode, it might however hamper the development of the blue color if the freshly formed methylene blue is also reduced, as described here above in the paragraph on redox indicator.

=== Test for milk freshness ===
Methylene blue is a dye behaving as a redox indicator that is commonly used in the food industry to test the freshness of milk and dairy products. A few drops of methylene blue solution added to a sample of milk should remain blue (oxidized form in the presence of enough dissolved O_{2}), otherwise (discoloration caused by the reduction of methylene blue into its colorless reduced form) the dissolved O_{2} concentration in the milk sample is low indicating that the milk is not fresh (already abiotically oxidized by O_{2} whose concentration in solution decreases) or could be contaminated by bacteria also consuming the atmospheric O_{2} dissolved in the milk. In other words, aerobic conditions should prevail in fresh milk, and methylene blue is simply used as an indicator of the dissolved oxygen remaining in the milk.

=== Water testing ===
The adsorption of methylene blue serves as an indicator defining the adsorptive capacity of granular activated carbon in water filters. Adsorption of methylene blue is very similar to adsorption of pesticides from water; this quality makes methylene blue serve as a good predictor for filtration qualities of carbon. It is also a quick method of comparing different batches of activated carbon of the same quality. A color reaction in an acidified, aqueous methylene blue solution containing chloroform can detect anionic surfactants in a water sample. Such a test is known as an MBAS assay (methylene blue active substances assay).

The MBAS assay cannot distinguish between specific surfactants, however. Some examples of anionic surfactants are carboxylates, phosphates, sulfates, and sulfonates.

=== Methylene blue value of fine aggregate ===
The methylene blue value is defined as the number of milliliters of standard methylene blue solution decolorized 0.1 g of activated carbon (dry basis). Methylene blue value reflects the amount of clay minerals in aggregate samples. In materials science, methylene blue solution is successively added to fine aggregate which is being agitated in water. The presence of free dye solution can be checked with a stain test on a filter paper.

=== Biological staining ===
In biology, methylene blue is used as a dye for a number of different staining procedures, such as Wright's stain and Jenner's stain. Since it is a temporary staining technique, methylene blue can also be used to examine RNA or DNA under the microscope or in a gel: as an example, a solution of methylene blue can be used to stain RNA on hybridization membranes in northern blotting to verify the amount of nucleic acid present. While methylene blue is not as sensitive as ethidium bromide, it is less toxic and it does not intercalate in nucleic acid chains, thus avoiding interference with nucleic acid retention on hybridization membranes or with the hybridization process itself.

It can also be used as an indicator to determine whether eukaryotic cells, such as yeast, are alive or dead. The methylene blue is reduced in viable cells, leaving them unstained. However, dead cells are unable to reduce the oxidized methylene blue, and the cells are stained blue. Methylene blue can interfere with the respiration of the yeast as it picks up hydrogen ions made during the process.

=== Aquaculture ===
- Methylene blue is used in aquaculture and by tropical fish hobbyists as a treatment for fungal infections. With the help of light, it is also effective against bacteria and viruses.
- It can also be effective in treating fish infected with the parasitic protozoa Ichthyophthirius multifiliis (ich), although a combination of malachite green and formaldehyde is far more effective against it.
- Methylene blue also works against nitrite poisoning as it treats the resulting methemoglobinemia. Like in humans, it also treats cyanide poisoning.
- Non-professional sources also claim that it works for ammonia poisoning, but there is little medical literature to back this up.

It is usually used to protect newly laid fish eggs from being infected by fungus. This is useful when the hobbyist wants to artificially hatch the fish eggs. For poisoning, injury (prevention of infection), or sickness, methylene blue is given as a "medicated bath" for the fish.

Methylene blue is not without side effects to fish.

== History ==
Methylene blue has been described as "the first fully synthetic drug used in medicine". The original Methylene blue first prepared in 1876 by German chemist Heinrich Caro. is a zinc double chloride salt which is associated with C.I Basic Blue 9 (CICN 52015) and not the chloride salt shown above.

Its use in the treatment of malaria was pioneered by Paul Guttmann and Paul Ehrlich in 1891. During this period before World War I, researchers like Ehrlich believed that drugs and dyes worked in the same way, by preferentially staining pathogens and possibly harming them. Changing the cell membrane of pathogens is how various drugs work, so the theory was partially correct, although far from complete. Methylene blue continued to be used in World War II, where it was not well-liked by soldiers, who observed, "Even at the loo, we see, we pee, navy blue."

It was discovered to be an antidote to carbon monoxide poisoning and cyanide poisoning in 1933 by Matilda Brooks.

Methylene blue was the original prototype or lead compound for the design of many antimalarials including chloroquine, antihistamines, and antipsychotics including chlorpromazine.

== Research ==
=== Malaria ===
Antimalarial use of the drug has recently (2009) been revived. It simultaneously targets many biological processes in the apicomplexan pathogen though the main mechanism seems to be causing a lethal amount of redox cycling.

A 2018 meta-analysis finds that it has proven effective against P. falciparum in Africa. It effectively reduces levels of the transmission-stage gametocyte and has synergy with the standard artemisinin-based combination therapy (ACT). Its effects against other malarial species and P. falciparum populations in other locations are unclear.

=== Ifosfamide toxicity ===
Another use of methylene blue is to treat ifosfamide neurotoxicity. Methylene blue was first reported for treatment and prophylaxis of ifosfamide neuropsychiatric toxicity in 1994. A toxic metabolite of ifosfamide, chloroacetaldehyde (CAA), disrupts the mitochondrial respiratory chain, leading to an accumulation of nicotinamide adenine dinucleotide hydrogen (NADH). Methylene blue acts as an alternative electron acceptor, and reverses the NADH inhibition of hepatic gluconeogenesis while also inhibiting the transformation of chloroethylamine into chloroacetaldehyde, and inhibits multiple amine oxidase activities, preventing the formation of CAA.

The dosing of methylene blue for treatment of ifosfamide neurotoxicity varies, depending upon its use simultaneously as an adjuvant in ifosfamide infusion, versus its use to reverse psychiatric symptoms that manifest after completion of an ifosfamide infusion. Reports suggest that methylene blue, up to six doses a day, has resulted in improvement of symptoms within 10 minutes to several days. Alternatively, it has been suggested that intravenous methylene blue every six hours for prophylaxis during ifosfamide treatment in people with history of ifosfamide neuropsychiatric toxicity. Prophylactic administration of methylene blue the day before initiation of ifosfamide, and three times daily during ifosfamide chemotherapy has been recommended to lower the occurrence of ifosfamide neurotoxicity.

=== Neuropsychiatric disorders ===
Methylene blue inhibits monoamine oxidase, inhibits the glutamatergic system (via inhibition of NO synthase and soluble guanylate cyclase), modulates mitochondrial function (by acting as an electron acceptor), and decreases the activation of inflammasomes NLRP3 and NLRC4. As a result, it's been considered potentially useful in neuropsychiatric disorders. In humans it has been tried for (listed in decreasing order of evidence quality): bipolar disorder (especially depressive symptoms), Alzheimer's disease, claustrophobia, ifosfamide encephalopathy, and schizophrenia. With methylene blue, a higher dose does not necessarily work better than a lower dose.

== Society and culture ==
In the late 2010s and early 2020s, a social media trend emerged promoting the use of methylene blue for various medical purposes, including anti-aging, metabolism enhancement, cognitive improvement, cancer treatment, and COVID-19 treatment. Currently there is no scientific consensus on, and no FDA approval for, its effectiveness and safety for these purposes. Medical experts cautioned that methylene blue can be toxic in high doses and may interact with other medications, potentially reducing their effectiveness or causing unforeseen side effects. Therefore, it should only be used under a doctor's prescription.

This trend probably started following the publication of a few scientific papers exploring the potential of methylene blue for treating some medical conditions, such as progeria, and skin aging. It was also explored as part of anticancer photodynamic therapy using lasers. One systematic review of the studies expresses optimism but emphasizes the need for more extensive research to confirm methylene blue's clinical applications. Another review takes a more critical stance, stating that "it is obvious that the clinical use of [methylene blue] represents a rather controversial problem given the heterogeneity of available data and the lack of preclinical data, which is in conflict with standards of safe use of such substances in human medicinal practice".
