= Glucosone =

Reactive carbonyl compound

d-Glucosone
- Skeletal formula of d-Glucosone

Names
- IUPAC name d-arabino-Hexos-2-ulose
- Systematic IUPAC name (3S,4R,5R)-3,4,5,6-tetrahydroxy-2-oxohexanal
- Other names: 2-Keto-D-glucose; 2-Ketoglucose

Identifiers
CAS Number	1854-25-7; 26345-59-5; 54142-77-7
3D model (JSmol)	Interactive image; Interactive image
ChemSpider	140353
KEGG	C22525
MeSH	glucosone
PubChem CID	159630
CompTox Dashboard (EPA)	DTXSID90171773
- InChI: InChI=1S/C6H10O6/c7-1-3(9)5(11)6(12)4(10)2-8/h1,4-6,8,10-12H,2H2/t4-,5-,6-/m1/s1 Key: DCNMIDLYWOTSGK-HSUXUTPPSA-N
- SMILES: C(C(C(C(C(=O)C=O)O)O)O)O; C([C@H]([C@H]([C@@H](C(=O)C=O)O)O)O)O

Properties
Chemical formula	C_{6}H_{10}O_{6}
Molar mass	178.140 g·mol^{−1}
- Except where otherwise noted, data are given for materials in their standard state (at 25 °C [77 °F], 100 kPa). Infobox references

Glucosone is a reactive carbonyl compound that can be produced by an Amadori rearrangement of a derivative of glucose. It is a dicarbonyl intermediate of the Maillard reaction whose production is higher under oxidative versus non-oxidative conditions.
