= Redox indicator =

Indicator which undergoes a definite color change at a specific electrode potential

A redox indicator (also called an oxidation-reduction indicator) is an indicator which undergoes a definite color change at a specific electrode potential.

The requirement for fast and reversible color change means that the oxidation-reduction equilibrium for an indicator redox system needs to be established very quickly. Therefore, only a few classes of organic redox systems can be used for indicator purposes.

There are two common classes of redox indicators:

- metal complexes of phenanthroline and bipyridine. In these systems, the metal changes oxidation state.
- organic redox systems such as methylene blue. In these systems, a proton participates in the redox reaction. Therefore, sometimes redox indicators are also divided into two general groups: independent or dependent on pH.

The most common redox indicator are organic compounds. Redox Indicator example: The molecule 2,2'- Bipyridine is a redox Indicator. In solution, it changes from light blue to red at an electrode potential of 0.97 V.

== pH independent ==
Indicator	E^{0}, V	Color of Oxidized form	Color of Reduced form
[Ru^{III/II}(2,2'-bipyridine)_{3}]	+1.33	green	orange
Nitrophenanthroline (Fe complex)	+1.25	cyan	red
N-Phenylanthranilic acid	+1.08	violet-red	colorless
1,10-Phenanthroline iron(II) sulfate complex (Ferroin)	+1.06	cyan	red
N-Ethoxychrysoidine	+1.00	red	yellow
2,2`-Bipyridine (Fe complex)	+0.97	cyan	red
5,6-Dimethylphenanthroline (Fe complex)	+0.97	yellow-green	cyan
o-Dianisidine	+0.85	red	colorless
Sodium diphenylamine sulfonate	+0.84	red-violet	colorless
Diphenylbenzidine	+0.76	violet	colorless
Diphenylamine	+0.76	violet	colorless
Viologen	-0.43	colorless	blue

== pH dependent ==
Indicator	E^{0}, V at pH=0	E, V at pH=7	Color of Oxidized form	Color of Reduced form
Sodium 2,6-Dibromophenol-indophenol or Sodium 2,6-Dichlorophenol-indophenol	+0.64	+0.22	blue	colorless
Sodium o-Cresol indophenol	+0.62	+0.19	blue	colorless
Thionine (syn. Lauth's violet)	+0.56	+0.06	violet	colorless
Methylene blue	+0.53	+0.01	blue	colorless
Indigotetrasulfonic acid	+0.37	-0.05	blue	colorless
Indigotrisulfonic acid	+0.33	-0.08	blue	colorless
Indigo carmine (syn. Indigodisulfonic acid	+0.29	-0.13	blue	colorless
Indigomono sulfonic acid	+0.26	-0.16	blue	colorless
Phenosafranin	+0.28	-0.25	red	colorless
Safranin T	+0.24	-0.29	red-violet	colorless
Neutral red	+0.24	-0.33	red	colorless

== See also ==
- Chemical analysis
- pH indicator
- Complexometric indicator
