= Thionine =

Chemical compound and histologic stain C12H10N3S

Names
- Preferred IUPAC name 3,7-Diamino-5λ^{4}-phenothiazin-5-ylium

Identifiers
CAS Number	26754-93-8
3D model (JSmol)	Interactive image
ChemSpider	10554883
ECHA InfoCard	100.008.611
PubChem CID	65043 (chloride salt)
UNII	8CFV7T4334
CompTox Dashboard (EPA)	DTXSID40928850, DTXSID60936593 DTXSID90883445, DTXSID40928850, DTXSID60936593
- InChI: InChI=1S/C12H10N3S/c13-7-1-3-9-11(5-7)16-12-6-8(14)2-4-10(12)15-9/h1-6H,13-14H2/q+1 Key: CBBMGBGDIPJEMI-UHFFFAOYSA-N
- SMILES: C1=CC2=C(C=C1N)[S+]=C3C=C(C=CC3=N2)N

Properties
Chemical formula	C_{12}H_{10}N_{3}S^{+}
Molar mass	228.29 g·mol^{−1}
- Except where otherwise noted, data are given for materials in their standard state (at 25 °C [77 °F], 100 kPa). verify (what is ?) Infobox references

Thionine, also known as Lauth's violet, is the salt of a heterocyclic compound. It was firstly synthesised by Charles Lauth. A variety of salts are known including the chloride and acetate, called respectively thionine chloride and thionine acetate. The dye is structurally related to methylene blue, which also features a phenothiazine core. The dye's name is frequently misspelled with omission of the e, and is not to be confused with the plant protein thionin. The -ine ending indicates that the compound is an amine.

== Dye properties and use ==
Thionine is a strongly staining metachromatic dye, which is widely used for biological staining. Thionine can also be used in place of Schiff reagent in quantitative Feulgen staining of DNA. It can also be used to mediate electron transfer in microbial fuel cells. Thionine is a pH-dependent redox indicator with E^{0} = 0.06 at pH 7.0. Its reduced form, leuco-thionine, is colorless.

When both the amines are dimethylated, the product tetramethyl thionine is the famous methylene blue, and the intermediates are Azure C (Monomethyl thionine), Azure A (when one of the amines is dimethylated and the other remains a primary amine), and Azure B (Trimethyl thionine). When methylene blue is "polychromed" by ripening (oxidized in solution or metabolized by fungal contamination, as originally noted in the thesis of Dr D L Romanowski in 1890s), it forms thionine and all the Azure intermediates.
