= Indigo carmine =

Blue dye derived from indigo

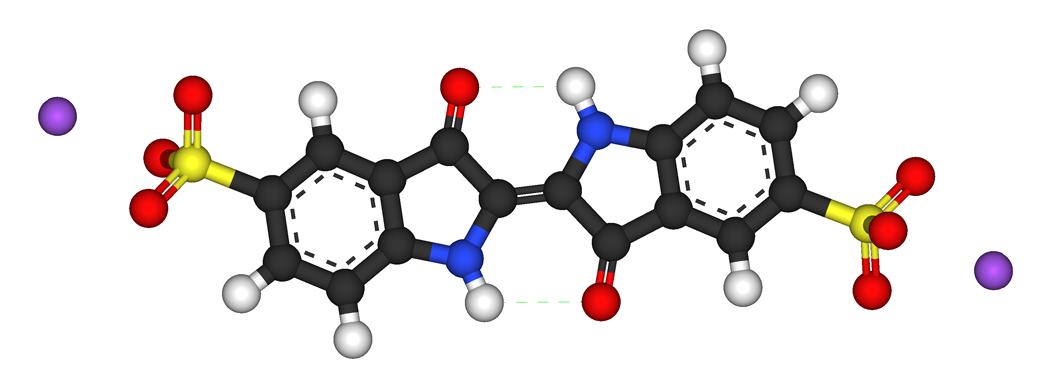

Names
- Preferred IUPAC name Disodium [2(2′)E]-3,3′-dioxo-1,1′,3,3′-tetrahydro[2,2′-biindolylidene]-5,5′-disulfonate
- Other names: indigotine; 5,5′-indigodisulfonic acid sodium salt; Brilliant Indigo; 4 G; C.I. Acid Blue 74; C.I. 73015; CI Food Blue 1; FD&C Blue 2; Sicovit Indigotin 85; E132; indigotindisulfonate sodium; Caustic Blue

Identifiers
CAS Number	860-22-0
3D model (JSmol)	Interactive image
ChEBI	CHEBI:31695
ChEMBL	ChEMBL2105023
ChemSpider	4447431
DrugBank	DB11577; DBSALT001752
ECHA InfoCard	100.011.572
EC Number	212-728-8
E number	E132 (colours)
KEGG	D01563
PubChem CID	2723854
UNII	D3741U8K7L
CompTox Dashboard (EPA)	DTXSID1020190
- InChI: InChI=1S/C16H10N2O8S2.2Na/c19-15-9-5-7(27(21,22)23)1-3-11(9)17-13(15)14-16(20)10-6-8(28(24,25)26)2-4-12(10)18-14;;/h1-6,17-18H,(H,21,22,23)(H,24,25,26);;/q;2*+1/p-2/b14-13+;; Key: KHLVKKOJDHCJMG-QDBORUFSSA-L; InChI=1/C16H10N2O8S2.2Na/c19-15-9-5-7(27(21,22)23)1-3-11(9)17-13(15)14-16(20)10-6-8(28(24,25)26)2-4-12(10)18-14;;/h1-6,17-18H,(H,21,22,23)(H,24,25,26);;/q;2*+1/p-2/b14-13+;; Key: KHLVKKOJDHCJMG-AKPRSONXBD
- SMILES: [Na+].[Na+].[O-]S(=O)(=O)c3cc4C(=O)\C(=C2\C(=O)c1cc(ccc1N2)S([O-])(=O)=O)Nc4cc3

Properties
Chemical formula	C_{16}H_{8}N_{2}Na_{2}O_{8}S_{2}
Molar mass	466.36 g/mol
Appearance	purple solid
Melting point	>300 °C (572 °F)
Solubility in water	10 g/L (25 °C (77 °F))

Hazards
- GHS labelling
Pictograms	(GHS07: Exclamation mark)
Signal word	Warning
Hazard statements	H302
NFPA 704 (fire diamond)	2 1 0

Pharmacology
ATC code	V04CH02 (WHO)
Legal status	US: ℞-only
- Except where otherwise noted, data are given for materials in their standard state (at 25 °C [77 °F], 100 kPa). verify (what is ?) Infobox references

Indigotindisulfonate sodium
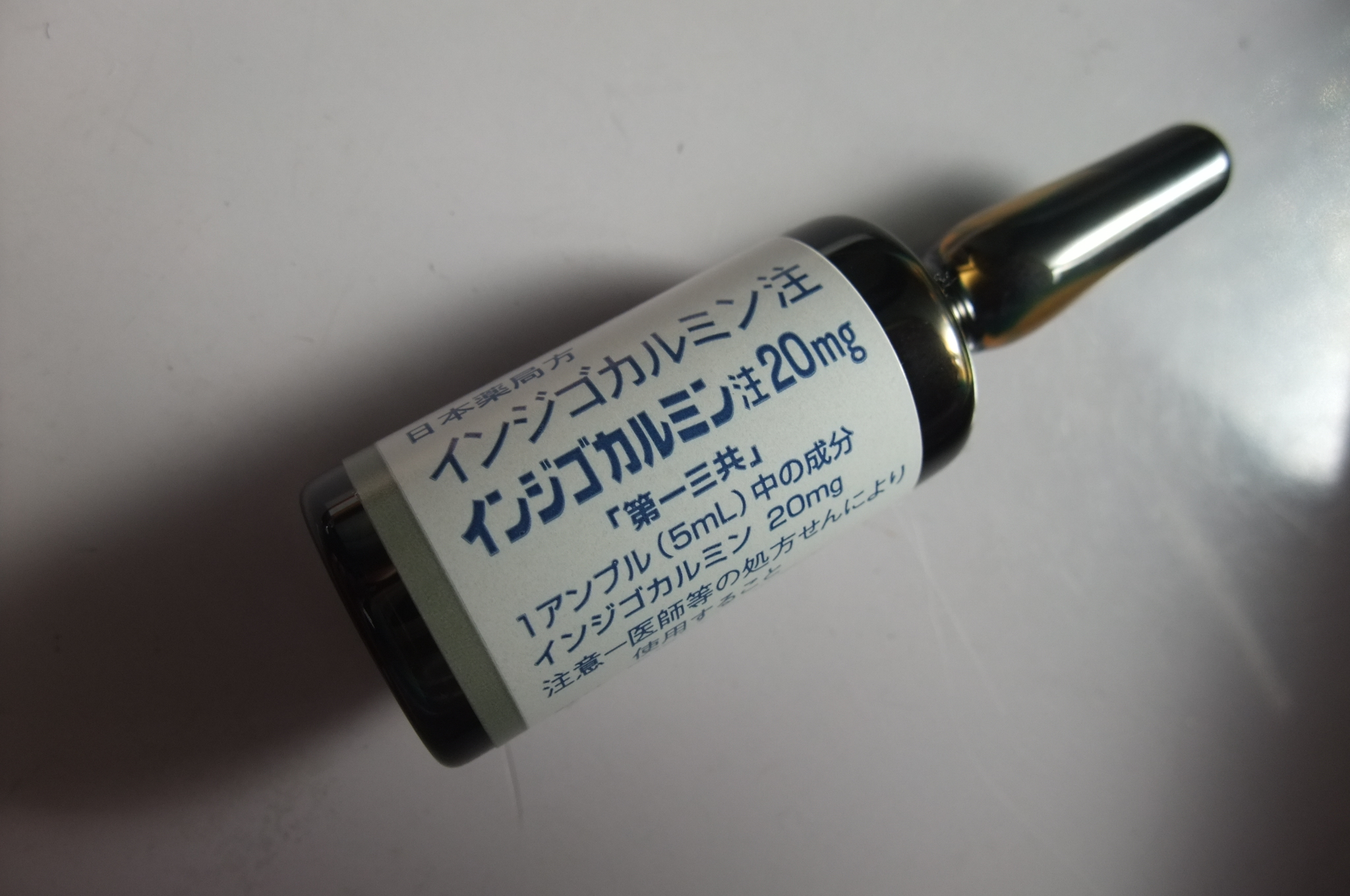
- Container of indigotindisulfonate sodium for medical use

Clinical data
- Trade names: Bludigo
- License data: US DailyMed: Indigotindisulfonate

Identifiers
- E number: E132 (colours)
- CompTox Dashboard (EPA): DTXSID1020190
- ECHA InfoCard: 100.011.572

Indigo carmine, or 5,5′-indigodisulfonic acid sodium salt, is an organic salt derived from indigo by aromatic sulfonation, which renders the compound soluble in water. Like indigo, it produces a blue color, and is used in food and other consumables, cosmetics, and as a medical contrast agent and staining agent; it also acts as a pH indicator. It is approved for human consumption in the United States and European Union. It has the E number E132, and is named FD&C Blue No. 2 by the US Federal Food, Drug, and Cosmetic Act.

== Uses ==
Indigo Carmine (pH indicator)
below pH 11.4		above pH 13.0
(blue) 11.4	⇌	13.0 (yellow)

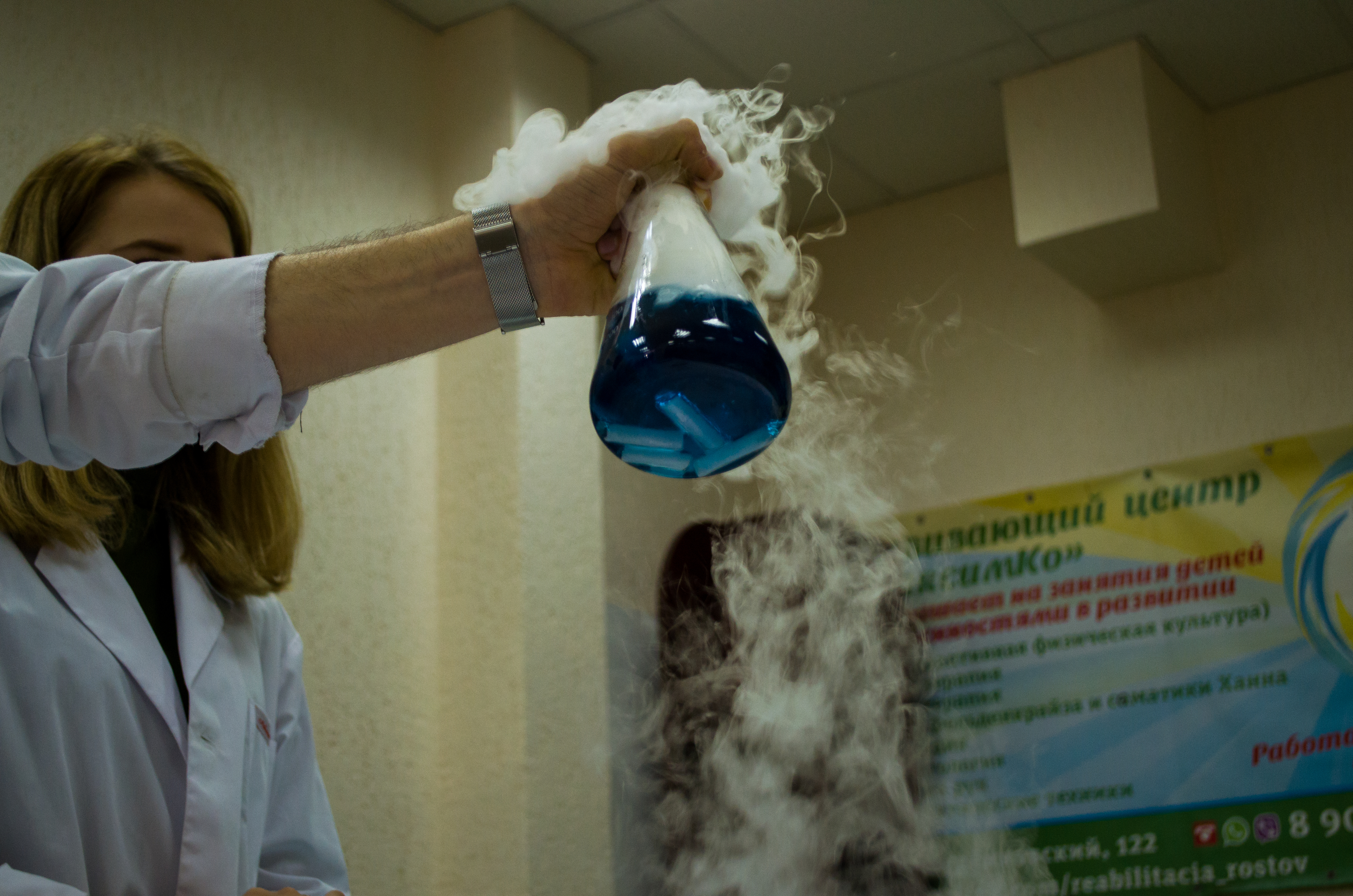
Experiment using indigo carmine as an indicator

Indigo carmine in a 0.2% aqueous solution is blue at pH 11.4 and yellow at 13.0. Indigo carmine is also a redox indicator, turning yellow upon reduction. Another use is as a dissolved ozone indicator through the conversion to isatin-5-sulfonic acid. This reaction has been shown not to be specific to ozone: it also detects superoxide, an important distinction in cell physiology. It is also used as a dye in the manufacturing of pharmaceutical capsules.

=== Medical uses ===
Indigotindisulfonate sodium, sold under the brand name Bludigo, is used as a contrast agent during surgical procedures. It is indicated for use in cystoscopy in adults following urological and gynecological procedures. It was approved for medical use in the United States in July 2022.

In obstetric surgery, it may be used to detect amniotic fluid leaks. In urologic surgery, intravenous indigo carmine can be used to highlight portions of the urinary tract. The dye is filtered rapidly by the kidneys from the blood, and colors the urine blue. However, the dye can cause a potentially dangerous acute increase in blood pressure in some cases.

Indigo carmine stain is not absorbed into cells, so it is applied to tissues to enhance the visibility of mucosa. This leads to its use for examination and diagnosis of benign and malignant lesions and growths on mucosal surfaces of the body.

=== Food, pharmaceutical, cosmetic, and scientific uses ===
Indigo carmine is one of the few blue food colorants. Others include the anthocyanidins and rare substances such as variegatic acid and popolohuanone.

== Safety and regulation ==
Indigo carmine shows "genotoxicity, developmental toxicity or modifications of haematological parameters in chronic toxicity studies". Only at 17 mg/kg of body weight per day were effects on testes observed.

It is currently approved in the EU and UK and US.
