= Azure A =

Names
- IUPAC name N',N'-dimethylphenothiazin-5-ium-3,7-diamine chloride
- Other names asym-Dimethylthionine Chloride; Methylene Azure A

Identifiers
CAS Number	531-53-3
3D model (JSmol)	Interactive image
Beilstein Reference	3922287
ChEBI	CHEBI:87637
ChemSpider	11218930
ECHA InfoCard	100.007.738
PubChem CID	13735
UNII	M731V243EF
CompTox Dashboard (EPA)	DTXSID2040157
- InChI: InChI=1S/C14H14N3S.ClH/c1-17(2)10-4-6-12-14(8-10)18-13-7-9(15)3-5-11(13)16-12;/h3-8H,15H2,1-2H3;1H/q+1;/p-1 Key: PGWTYMLATMNCCZ-UHFFFAOYSA-M
- SMILES: [Cl-].CN(C)c1cc2[s+]c3cc(N)ccc3nc2cc1

Properties
Chemical formula	C_{14}H_{14}ClN_{3}S
Appearance	green to dark brown powder
Density	1.776
- Except where otherwise noted, data are given for materials in their standard state (at 25 °C [77 °F], 100 kPa). verify (what is ?) Infobox references

Azure A is an organic compound with the chemical formula C_{14}H_{14}ClN_{3}S. It is a light blue to dark blue dye. It is used as a screening test for mucopolysaccharides. It can also be used to stain lysosomes in blood smears, and is often used in Giemsa stain. It's formed via oxidation of Methylene blue.
