= Acute myeloid leukemia =

Cancer of the myeloid line of blood cells

- Other names: Acute myelogenous leukemia; Acute nonlymphocytic leukemia (ANLL); Acute myeloblastic leukemia; Acute granulocytic leukemia
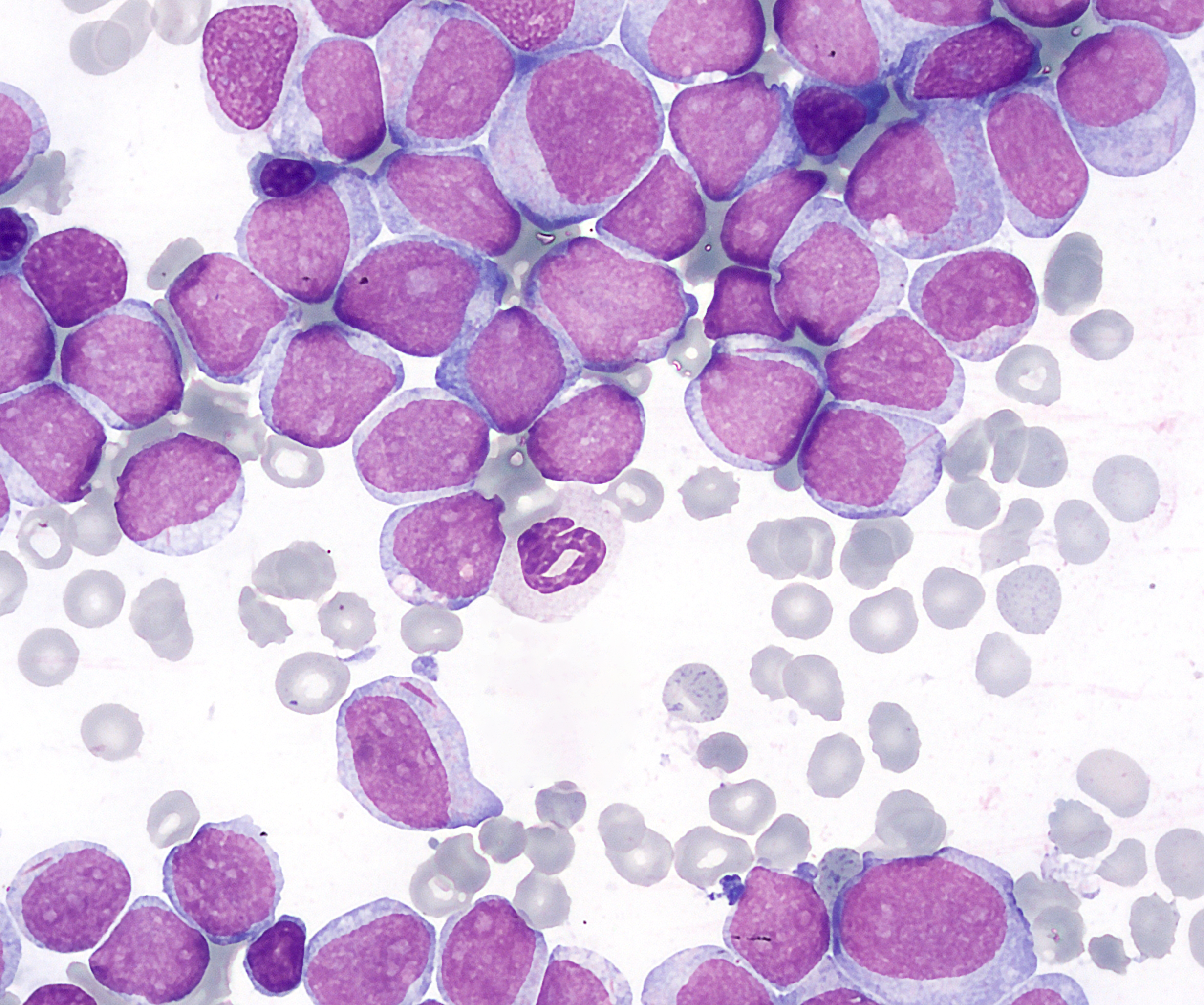
- Acute myeloid leukemia. In the cytoplasm of individual cells, characteristic inclusions – Auer rods – are visible.
- Specialty: Hematology, oncology
- Symptoms: Feeling tired; Shortness of breath; Easy bruising and bleeding; Increased risk of infection
- Usual onset: 65–70 years old
- Risk factors: Smoking; Previous chemotherapy; Previuous radiation therapy; Myelodysplastic syndrome; Benzene
- Diagnostic method: Bone marrow aspiration; Blood test
- Treatment: Chemotherapy; Radiation therapy; Stem cell transplant; Targeted inhibitors
- Prognosis: Five-year survival ~33%; (US, 2015–2021)
- Frequency: 145,000 per year (2021)
- Deaths: 130,000 (2021)

Acute myeloid leukemia (AML) is a cancer of the myeloid line of blood cells, characterized by the rapid growth of abnormal cells that build up in the bone marrow and blood and interfere with normal blood cell production. Symptoms may include feeling tired, shortness of breath, easy bruising, bleeding, and increased risk of infection. Occasionally, spread may occur to the brain, skin, or gums. As an acute leukemia, AML progresses rapidly, and is typically fatal within weeks or months if left untreated.

Risk factors include getting older, being male, smoking, previous chemotherapy or radiation therapy, myelodysplastic syndrome, and exposure to the chemical benzene. The underlying mechanism involves replacement of normal bone marrow with leukemia cells, which results in a drop in red blood cells, platelets, and normal white blood cells. Diagnosis is generally based on bone marrow aspiration and specific blood tests. AML has several subtypes for which treatments and outcomes may vary.

The first-line treatment of AML is usually chemotherapy, intending to induce remission. People may then go on to receive additional chemotherapy, radiation therapy, or a stem cell transplant. The specific genetic mutations present within the cancer cells may guide therapy, as well as determine how long that person is likely to survive.

Between 2017 and 2025, 12 new agents have been approved for AML in the U.S., including venetoclax (BCL2 inhibitor), gemtuzumab ozogamicin (CD33 antibody-drug conjugate), and several inhibitors targeting FMS-like tyrosine kinase 3, isocitrate dehydrogenase, and other pathways. Additionally, therapies like CPX351 and oral formulations of azacitidine and decitabine-cedazuridine have been introduced. Ongoing research is exploring menin inhibitors and other antibody-drug conjugates.

Low-intensity treatment with azacitidine plus venetoclax has emerged as the most effective option for older or unfit AML patients, based on a network meta-analysis of 26 trials involving 4,920 participants. It showed the highest survival and remission rates, with low-dose cytarabine (LDAC) plus glasdegib and LDAC plus venetoclax also showing clinical benefit.

In 2015, AML affected about one million people and resulted in 147,000 deaths globally. It most commonly occurs in older adults. Males are affected more often than females. As of 2015, the five-year survival rate was about 35% in people under 60 years old and 10% in people over 60 years old. Older people whose health is too poor for intensive chemotherapy have a typical survival of five to ten months. It accounts for roughly 1.1% of all cancer cases, and 1.8% of cancer deaths in the United States.

== Signs and symptoms ==
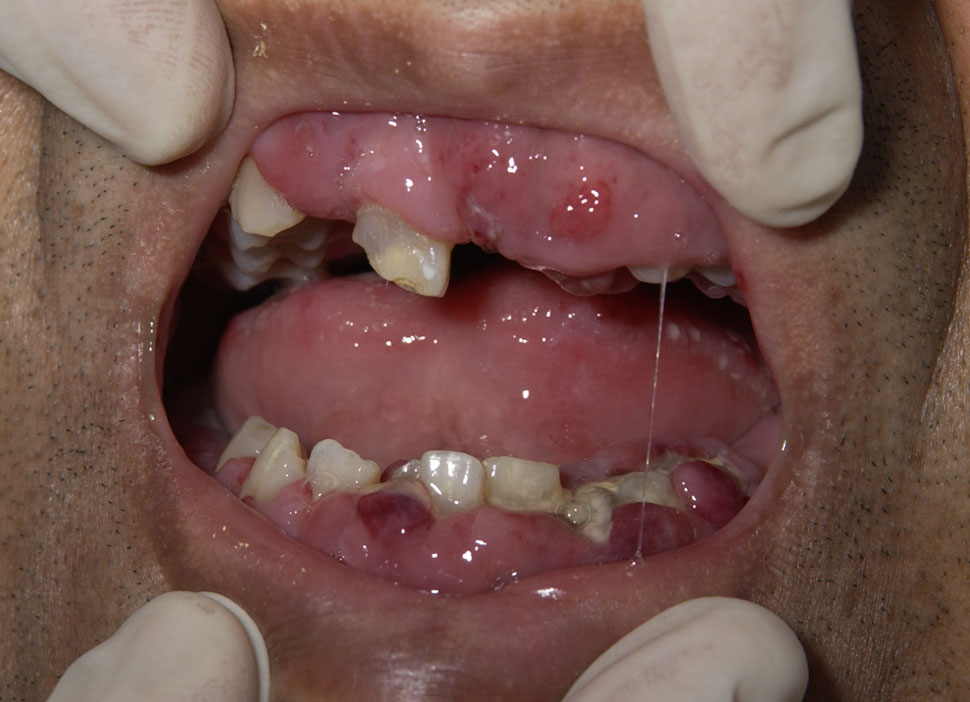
Swollen gums due to infiltration by leukemia cells in a person with AML

Most signs and symptoms of AML are caused by the crowding out in bone marrow of space for normal blood cells to develop. A lack of normal white blood cell production makes people more susceptible to infections. A low red blood cell count (anemia) can cause fatigue, paleness, shortness of breath and palpitations. A lack of platelets can lead to easy bruising, bleeding from the nose (epistaxis), small blood vessels on the skin (petechiae) or gums, or bleeding with minor trauma. Other symptoms may include fever, fatigue worse than what can be attributed to anemia alone, weight loss, and loss of appetite.

Enlargement of the spleen may occur in AML, but it is typically mild and asymptomatic. Lymph node swelling is rare in most types of AML, except for acute myelomonocytic leukemia (AMML). The skin can be involved in the form of leukemia cutis; Sweet's syndrome; or non-specific findings: flat lesions (macules), raised lesion papules, pyoderma gangrenosum and vasculitis.

Some people with AML may experience swelling of the gums because of infiltration of leukemic cells into the gum tissue. Involvement of other parts of the body, such as the gastrointestinal tract, respiratory tract, and other parts, is possible but less common. One area which has particular importance for treatment is whether there is involvement of the meninges around the central nervous system.

Frequency of Symptoms on Initial Diagnosis of AML
Symptom	Frequency (Adult)	Frequency (Pediatric)	Frequency (Overall)
Fever	76%	85%	48-80%
Fatigue	63%	40%	33-54%
Bleeding	28%	32%	20-29%
Pallor	84%	85%	~85%
Lymphadenopathy	30%	55%	12-40%
Hepatomegaly	23%	38%	22-29%
Splenomegaly	21%	27%	23-37%
Enlarged gums	15%	11%	~13%
Bone or body pain	-	-	~7%

== Subtypes of AML ==
The following are common AML subtypes:

- AML with specific genetic abnormalities: An example is acute promyelocytic leukemia.
- Acute promyelocytic leukemia: A unique type of AML that is highly treatable.
- AML with myelodysplasia-related changes: A disorder often seen in those with myelodysplasia-related blood cancers and in the elderly population as well.
- Therapy-related AML (t-AML): AML that has developed after chemotherapy or radiation therapy.
- AML with gene mutations: A category of subtypes that may qualify for targeted therapies.
- AML not otherwise specified (NOS)

== Risk factors ==
Most cases of AML do not have exposure to any identified risk factors. However, several risk factors for developing AML have been identified. These include other blood disorders, chemical exposures, ionizing radiation, and genetic risk factors. Where a defined exposure to past chemotherapy, radiotherapy, toxin or hematologic malignancy is known, this is termed secondary AML.

=== Other blood disorders ===
Other blood disorders, particularly myelodysplastic syndrome (MDS) and less commonly myeloproliferative neoplasms (MPN), can evolve into AML; the exact risk depends on the type of MDS/MPN. The presence of asymptomatic clonal hematopoiesis also raises the risk of transformation into AML.

=== Chemical exposure ===
Exposure to chemotherapy, in particular, alkylating antineoplastic agents, can increase the risk of subsequently developing AML. Other chemotherapy agents, including fludarabine and topoisomerase II inhibitors are also associated with the development of AML, most commonly after 4–6 years and 1–3 years respectively. These are often associated with specific chromosomal abnormalities in the leukemic cells.

Other chemical exposures associated with the development of AML include benzene, chloramphenicol, and phenylbutazone. The use of Agent Orange, a militarized herbicide used in the Vietnam War has been associated with the risk of AML due to the herbicide regularly having been contaminated by 2,3,7,8-tetrachlorodibenzo-p-dioxin (TCDD), the most toxic dioxin known.

=== Radiation ===
High amounts of ionizing radiation exposure, such as that used for radiotherapy used to treat some forms of cancer, can increase the risk of AML. People treated with ionizing radiation after treatment for prostate cancer, non-Hodgkin lymphoma, lung cancer, and breast cancer have the highest chance of acquiring AML, but this increased risk returns to the background risk observed in the general population after 12 years. Historically, survivors of the atomic bombings of Hiroshima and Nagasaki had an increased rate of AML, as did radiologists exposed to high levels of X-rays prior to the adoption of modern radiation safety practices.

=== Genetics ===
Traditionally, AML was considered sporadic, with only a few exceptions associated with rare hereditary conditions such as Down syndrome, Fanconi anemia, and telomere biology disorders. With the introduction of Next Generation Sequencing (NGS) in clinical work-up, it is now estimated that up to 5–15% of all AML cases carry a pathogenic variant in a cancer susceptibility gene. Myeloid neoplasm with germline predisposition is recognized as a distinct category in the WHO 2022 classification of haematolymphoid tumors.

=== Other factors ===
Being overweight and obese increase the risk of developing AML, as does any amount of active smoking. For reasons that may relate to substance or radiation exposure, certain occupations have a higher rate of AML; particularly work in the nuclear power industry, electronics or computer manufacturing, fishing, and animal slaughtering and processing.

== Pathophysiology ==
Diagram showing the cells where AML develops

The malignant cell in AML is the myeloblast. In normal development of blood cells (hematopoiesis), the myeloblast is an immature precursor of myeloid white blood cells; a normal myeloblast will mature into a white blood cell such as an eosinophil, basophil, neutrophil, or monocyte. In AML, though, a single myeloblast accumulates genetic changes that stop maturation, increase its proliferation, and protect it from programmed cell death (apoptosis). Much of the diversity and heterogeneity of AML is because leukemic transformation can occur at several different steps along the differentiation pathway. Genetic abnormalities or the stage at which differentiation was halted form part of modern classification systems.

Specific cytogenetic abnormalities can be found in many people with AML; the types of chromosomal abnormalities often have prognostic significance. The chromosomal translocations encode abnormal fusion proteins, usually transcription factors whose altered properties may cause the "differentiation arrest". For example, in APL, the t(15;17) translocation produces a PML-RARA fusion protein which binds to the retinoic acid receptor element in the promoters of several myeloid-specific genes and inhibits myeloid differentiation.

The clinical signs and symptoms of AML result from the growth of leukemic clone cells, which tend to interfere with the development of normal blood cells in the bone marrow. This leads to neutropenia, anemia, and thrombocytopenia. Other symptoms can arise from the infiltration of malignant cells into parts of the body, such as the gingiva and skin.

Many cells develop mutations in genes that affect epigenetics, such as DNA methylation. When these mutations occur, it is likely in the early stages of AML. Such mutations include in the DNA demethylase TET2 and the metabolic enzymes IDH1 and IDH2, which lead to the generation of a novel oncometabolite, D-2-hydroxyglutarate, which inhibits the activity of epigenetic enzymes such as TET2. Epigenetic mutations may lead to the silencing of tumor suppressor genes and/or the activation of proto-oncogenes.

== Diagnosis ==
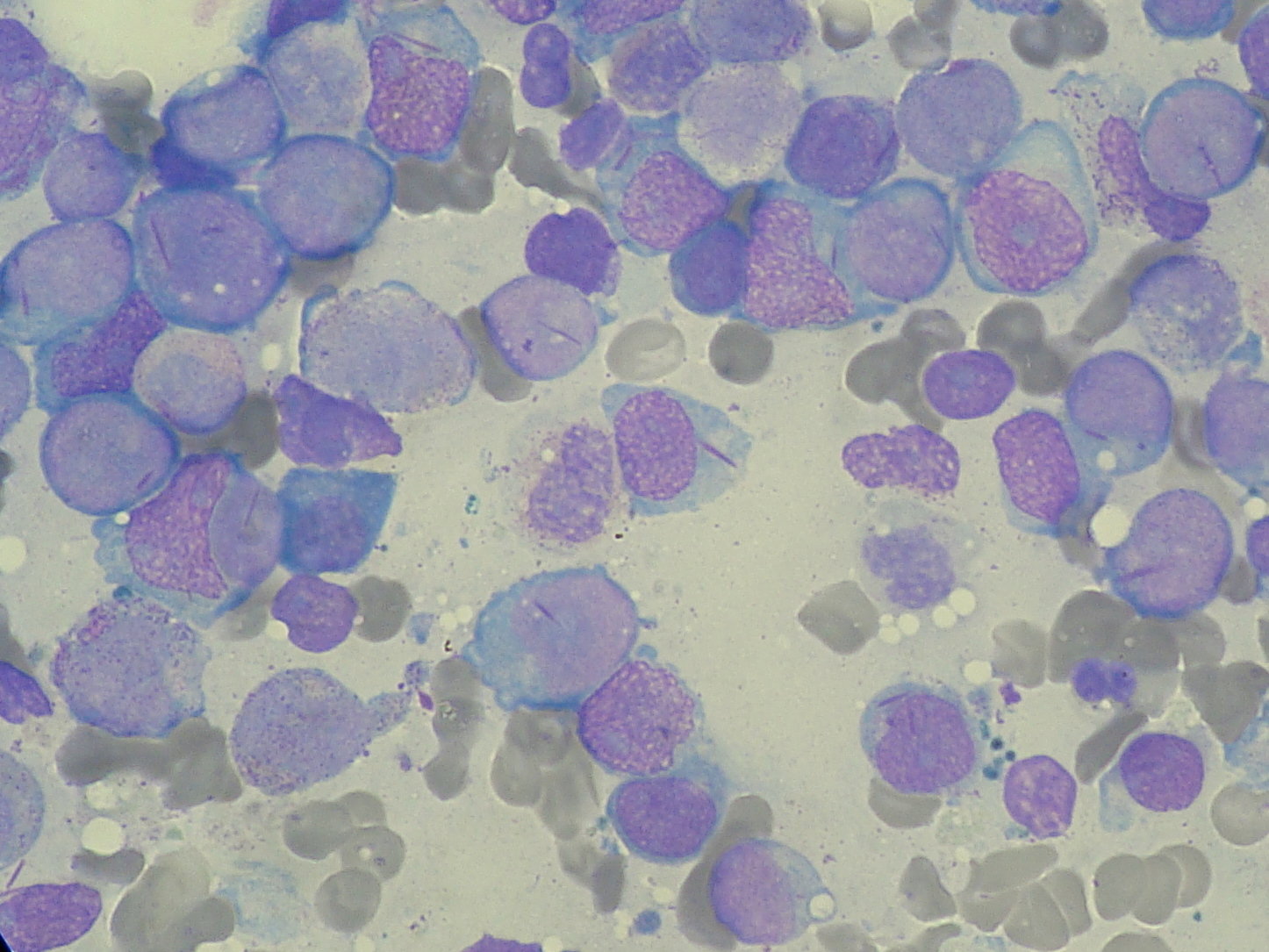
Bone marrow: myeloblasts with Auer rods seen in AML

A complete blood count, which is a blood test, is one of the initial steps in the diagnosis of AML. It may reveal an excess of white blood cells (leukocytosis) or a decrease (leukopenia), and a low red blood cell count (anemia) and a low platelet count (thrombocytopenia) can also be commonly seen. A blood film may show leukemic blast cells. Inclusions within the cells called Auer rods, when seen, make the diagnosis highly likely. A definitive diagnosis requires a bone marrow aspiration and biopsy.

Bone marrow is examined under light microscopy, as well as flow cytometry, to diagnose the presence of leukemia, to differentiate AML from other types of leukemia (e.g. acute lymphoblastic leukemia), and to provide information about how mature or immature the affected cells are, which can assist in classifying the subtype of disease. A sample of marrow or blood is typically also tested for chromosomal abnormalities by routine cytogenetics or fluorescent in situ hybridization. Genetic studies may also be performed to look for specific mutations in genes such as FLT3, nucleophosmin, and KIT, which may influence disease outcome.

Cytochemical stains on blood and bone marrow smears are helpful in the distinction of AML from ALL, and in the subclassification of AML. The combination of a myeloperoxidase or Sudan black stain and a nonspecific esterase stain will provide the desired information in most cases. The myeloperoxidase or Sudan black reactions are most useful in establishing the identity of AML and distinguishing it from ALL. The nonspecific esterase stain is used to identify a monocytic component in AMLs and to distinguish a poorly differentiated monoblastic leukemia from ALL.

The standard classification scheme for AML is the World Health Organization (WHO) system. According to the WHO criteria, the diagnosis of AML is established by demonstrating involvement of more than 20% of the blood and/or bone marrow by leukemic myeloblasts, except in three forms of acute myeloid leukemia with recurrent genetic abnormalities: t(8;21), inv(16) or t(16;16), and acute promyelocytic leukemia with PML-RARA, in which the presence of the genetic abnormality is diagnostic irrespective of blast percent. Myeloid sarcoma is also considered a subtype of AML independently of the blast count. The older French–American–British (FAB) classification, which is no longer widely used, is a bit more stringent, requiring a blast percentage of at least 30% in bone marrow or peripheral blood for the diagnosis of AML.

Because acute promyelocytic leukemia has the highest curability and requires a unique form of treatment, it is important to quickly establish or exclude the diagnosis of this subtype of leukemia. Fluorescent in situ hybridization performed on blood or bone marrow is often used for this purpose, as it readily identifies the chromosomal translocation [t(15;17)(q22;q12);] that characterizes APL. There is also a need to molecularly detect the presence of PML/RARA fusion protein, which is an oncogenic product of that translocation.

=== World Health Organization ===
The WHO classification of AML attempts to be more clinically useful and to produce more meaningful prognostic information than the FAB criteria. The French–American–British (FAB) classification system is based on morphology to define specific immunotypes. The World Health Organization (WHO) classification reviews chromosome translocations and evidence of dysplasia. See French–American–British (FAB) classification system.

Each of the WHO categories contains numerous descriptive subcategories of interest to the hematopathologist and oncologist; however, most clinically significant information in the WHO schema is communicated via categorization into one of the subtypes listed below.

The revised fourth edition of the WHO Classification of Tumours of Haematopoietic and Lymphoid Tissues was released in 2016. This classification, based on a combination of genetic and immunophenotypic markers and morphology, defines the subtypes of AML and related neoplasms as shown below. In 2022, a new classification was published.

Name	Description	ICD-O
Acute myeloid leukemia with recurrent genetic abnormalities	Includes: AML with translocations between chromosome 8 and 21 – [t(8;21)(q22;q22.1);] RUNX1–RUNX1T1; (ICD-O 9896/3); AML with inversions in chromosome 16 – [inv(16)(p13.1q22)] or internal translocations in it – [t(16;16)(p13.1;q22);] CBFB–MYH11; (ICD-O 9871/3); Acute promyelocytic leukemia with PML–RARA; (ICD-O 9866/3); AML with translocations between chromosome 9 and 11 – [t(9;11)(p21.3;q23.3);] KMT2A–MLLT3; AML with translocations between chromosome 6 and 9 – [t(6;9)(p23;q34.1);] DEK–NUP214; AML with inversions in chromosome 3 – [inv(3)(q21.3q26.2)] or internal translocations in it – [t(3;3)(q21.3;q26.2);] GATA2, MECOM; Megakaryoblastic AML with translocations between chromosome 1 and 22 – [t(1;22)(p13.3;q13.1);] RBM15–MKL1; AML with mutated NPM1; AML with biallelic mutations of CEBPA; Provisional: AML with BCR-ABL1 and AML with mutated RUNX1	Multiple
AML with myelodysplasia-related changes	This category includes people who have had a prior documented myelodysplastic syndrome (MDS) or myeloproliferative disease (MPD) that then has transformed into AML; who have cytogenetic abnormalities characteristic for this type of AML (with previous history of MDS or MPD that has gone unnoticed in the past, but the cytogenetics is still suggestive of MDS/MPD history); or who have AML with morphologic features of myelodysplasia (dysplastic changes in multiple cell lines). People who have previously received chemotherapy or radiation treatment for a non-MDS/MPD disease, and people who have genetic markers associated with AML with recurrent genetic abnormalities, are excluded from this category. This category of AML occurs most often in elderly people and often has a worse prognosis. Cytogenetic markers for AML with myelodysplasia-related changes include: Complex karyotype (meaning more than three chromosomal abnormalities); Unbalanced abnormalities; Deletions or loss of chromosome 7 – [del(7q)/-7;]; Deletions or translocations in chromosome 5 – [del(5q)/t(5q);]; Unbalanced chromosomal aberrations in chromosome 17 – [i(17q)/t(17p);]; Deletions or loss of chromosome 13 – [del(13q)/-13;]; Deletions of chromosome 11 – [del(11q);]; Unbalanced chromosomal aberrations in chromosome 12 – [del(12p)/t(12p);]; Aberrations in chromosome X – [idic(X)(q13);]; Balanced abnormalities; Translocations between chromosome 11 and 16 – [t(11;16)(q23.3;q13.3);]; Translocations between chromosome 3 and 21 – [t(3;21)(q26.2;q22.1);]; Translocations between chromosome 1 and 3 – [t(1;3)(p36.3;q21.2);]; Translocations between chromosome 2 and 11 – [t(2;11)(p21;q23.3);]; Translocations between chromosome 5 and 12 – [t(5;12)(q32;p13.2);]; Translocations between chromosome 5 and 7 – [t(5;7)(q32;q11.2);]; Translocations between chromosome 5 and 17 – [t(5;17)(q32;p13.2);]; Translocations between chromosome 5 and 10 – [t(5;10)(q32;q21);]; Translocations between chromosome 3 and 5 – [t(3;5)(q25.3;q35.1);]	M9895/3
Therapy-related myeloid neoplasms	This category includes people who have had prior chemotherapy and/or radiation and subsequently develop AML or MDS. Specific chromosomal abnormalities may characterize these leukemias, which often carry a worse prognosis.	M9920/3
Myeloid sarcoma	This category includes myeloid sarcoma.	
Myeloid proliferations related to Down syndrome	This category includes "transient abnormal myelopoiesis" and "myeloid leukemia associated with Down syndrome". In young children, myeloid leukemia associated with Down syndrome has a much better prognosis than other types of childhood AML. The prognosis in older children is similar to conventional AML.	
AML not otherwise categorized	Includes subtypes of AML that do not fall into the above categories: AML with minimal differentiation; AML without maturation; AML with maturation; Acute myelomonocytic leukemia; Acute monoblastic and monocytic leukemia; Pure erythroid leukemia; Acute megakaryoblastic leukemia; Acute basophilic leukemia; Acute panmyelosis with myelofibrosis	M9861/3

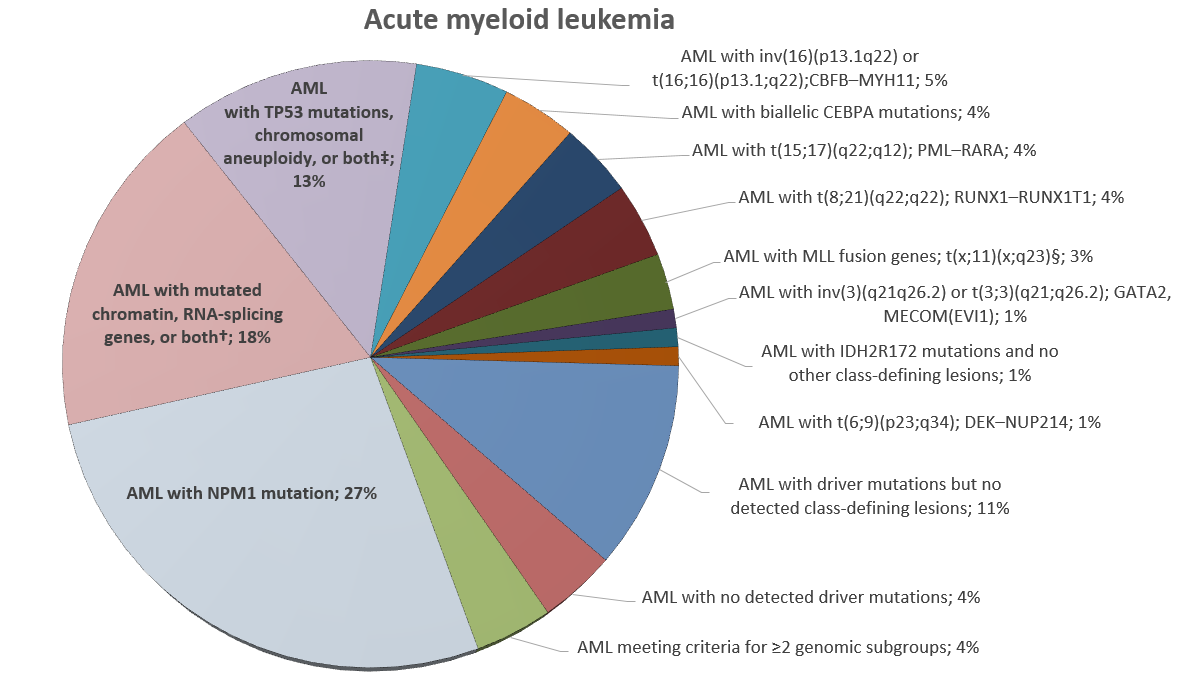
Relative incidence of acute myeloid leukemia subtypes by genetic changes

Acute leukemias of ambiguous lineage (also known as mixed phenotype or biphenotypic acute leukemia) occur when the leukemic cells can not be classified as either myeloid or lymphoid cells, or where both types of cells are present.

=== French–American–British ===
The French–American–British (FAB) classification system provides terminology that is still sometimes used. It remains a valuable diagnostic tool in areas without access to genetic testing. This system has largely been rendered obsolete by the WHO classification, which correlates more strongly with treatment outcomes.

The FAB system divides AML into eight subtypes, M0 through M7, based on the cell type from which the leukemia developed and its degree of maturity. AML of types M0 to M2 may be called acute myeloblastic leukemia. Classification is done by examining the appearance of the malignant cells with light microscopy and/or by using cytogenetics to characterize any underlying chromosomal abnormalities. The subtypes have varying prognoses and responses to therapy.

Six FAB subtypes (M1 through to M6) were initially proposed in 1976, although later revisions added M7 in 1985 and M0 in 1987.

Type	Name	Cytogenetics	Percentage of adults with AML	Immunophenotype				
Type	Name	Cytogenetics	Percentage of adults with AML	CD14	CD15	CD33	HLA-DR	Other
M0	acute myeloblastic leukemia, minimally differentiated		5%	−	−	+	+	MPO −
M1	acute myeloblastic leukemia, without maturation		15%	−	−	+	+	MPO +
M2	acute myeloblastic leukemia, with granulocytic maturation	t(8;21)(q22;q22), t(6;9)	25%	−	+	+	+	
M3	promyelocytic, or acute promyelocytic leukemia (APL)	t(15;17)	10%	−	+	+	−	
M4	acute myelomonocytic leukemia	inv(16)(p13q22), del(16q)	20%	<45%	+	+	+	
M4eo	myelomonocytic together with bone marrow eosinophilia	inv(16), t(16;16)	5%	+/−		+	+	CD2+
M5	acute monoblastic leukemia (M5a) or acute monocytic leukemia (M5b)	del (11q), t(9;11), t(11;19)	10%	>55%	+	+	+	
M6	acute erythroid leukemias, including erythroleukemia (M6a) and very rare pure erythroid leukemia (M6b)		5%	−	+/−	+/−	+/−	Glycophorin +
M7	acute megakaryoblastic leukemia	t(1;22)	5%	−	−	+	+/−	CD41/CD61+

The morphologic subtypes of AML also include rare types not included in the FAB system, such as acute basophilic leukemia, which was proposed as a ninth subtype, M8, in 1999.

== Treatment ==
The first-line treatment of acute myeloid leukemia consists primarily of chemotherapy, and is divided into two phases: induction and consolidation. The goal of induction therapy is to reduce the leukemic cells to undetectable levels (and thus achieve remission); the goal of consolidation therapy is to eliminate any residual undetectable disease and achieve a cure. Hematopoietic stem cell transplantation is usually considered if induction chemotherapy fails or after a person relapses. Transplantation is also sometimes used as front-line therapy for people with high-risk disease. Efforts to use targeted therapies such as tyrosine kinase inhibitors in AML continue. Various induction strategies are used, most of which center on daunorubicin (or a closely related drug) and cytarabine.

Ziftomenib (Komzifti) was approved for medical use in the United States in November 2025.

=== Induction chemotherapy ===
The goal and purpose of the induction phase is to reach a complete remission. Complete remission does not mean the disease has been cured; rather, it signifies that no disease can be detected with available diagnostic methods. All subtypes except acute promyelocytic leukemia are usually given induction chemotherapy with cytarabine and an anthracycline such as daunorubicin or idarubicin. This induction chemotherapy regimen is known as "7+3" (or "3+7"), because the cytarabine is given as a continuous IV infusion for seven consecutive days while the anthracycline is given for three consecutive days as an IV push. Response to this treatment varies with age, with people aged less than 60 years having better remission rates between 60% and 80%, while older people having lower remission rates between 33% and 60%. Because of the toxic effects of therapy and a greater chance of AML resistance to this induction therapy, different treatment, such as that in clinical trials might be offered to people 60–65 years or older.

Acute promyelocytic leukemia is treated with all-trans-retinoic acid (ATRA) and either arsenic trioxide (ATO) monotherapy or an anthracycline. A syndrome similar to disseminated intravascular coagulation can develop during the initial few days of treatment or at the time the leukemia is diagnosed. Treatment can be complicated by a differentiation syndrome characterized by fever, fluid overload, and low oxygen levels. Acute promyelocytic leukemia is considered curable. There is insufficient evidence to determine if prescribing ATRA in addition to chemotherapy to adults who have other subtypes of acute myeloid leukemia is helpful.

=== Consolidation chemotherapy ===
Even after complete remission is achieved, leukemic cells likely remain in numbers too small to be detected with current diagnostic techniques. If no consolidation therapy or further postremission therapy is given, almost all people with AML will eventually relapse.

The specific type of postremission therapy is individualized based on a person's prognostic factors (see above) and general health. For good-prognosis leukemias (i.e., inv(16), t(8;21), and t(15;17)), people will typically undergo an additional three to five courses of intensive chemotherapy, known as consolidation chemotherapy. This generally involves cytarabine, with the doses administered being higher in younger patients, who are less likely to develop toxicity related to this treatment.

=== Targeted therapies ===
Since 2017, a number of targeted therapies, such as Tyrosine Kinase Inhibitors and BCL-2 Inhibitors have been approved. These agents have expanded treatment options for patients with relapsed or refractory disease, as well as those who are unsuitable for intensive chemotherapy. Several studies demonstrate improved response rates and improved overall survival compared with previous standards of care.

As well as their role in treating relapsed or refractory disease, inhibitors have been used as maintenance therapy after a patient has undergone Stem Cell Transplantation.

The targeted therapies currently approved by the FDA are:

- Midostaurin
- Gilteritinib
- Quizartinib
- Ivosidenib
- Olutasidenib
- Enasidenib
- Venetoclax
- Glasdegib
- Revumenib
- Ziftomenib

=== Stem cell transplantation ===
Stem cell transplantation from a donor, called allogenic stem cell transplantation, is usually pursued if the prognosis is not considered favorable, a person can tolerate a transplant, and has a suitable donor. The basis of allogenic stem cell transplantation is on a graft versus leukemia effect whereby graft cells stimulate an immune response against leukemia cells. Unfortunately, this is accompanied by immune responses against other host organs, called a graft versus host disease.

Theoretical therapies have been proposed based on the idea of using stem cell transplantation to replace blood stem cells with genetically modified versions with altered molecular markers, including CD45, which is present on most blood cells. A treatment would then be applied, such as an antibody-drug conjugate targeting the healthy version of the marker, in order to kill all blood cells with unmodified markers, including the original cells and the cancerous ones. Theoretical therapies have also been proposed to use genetic engineering to attach synthetic chimeric antigen receptors to T-cells. These would bind to markers present in high levels in AML cells, which include CD123 and CD135. T-cells could also be modified to target normal CD45 markers, but this requires also modifying the CD-45 of T-cells as well so that they do not target themselves. T-cell immunotherapies are being tested in mice and in early-phase clinical trials, but none has been approved as a standard of care for AML.

=== Supportive treatment ===
Support is necessary throughout treatment because of problems associated with AML and also arising from treatment. Blood transfusions, including red blood cells and platelets, are necessary to maintain health levels, preventing complications of anemia (from low red blood cells) and bleeding (from low platelets). AML leads to an increased risk of infections, particularly drug-resistant strains of bacteria and fungi. Antibiotics and antifungals can be used both to treat and to prevent these infections, particularly quinolones.

Adding aerobic exercise to the standard of care may result in little to no difference in mortality, quality of life, and physical functioning. These exercises may result in a slight reduction in depression. Furthermore, aerobic physical exercises probably reduce fatigue.

Recent research into the role of epigenetic regulators in hematopoietic malignancies has yielded new insights into the development of targeted epigenetic therapies as a supportive treatment for AML. The FDA has approved certain epigenetic-modifying drugs like ivosidenib and enasidenib, which are used in patients who can no longer receive intensive induction chemotherapy; specifically, they are involved in the therapy of IDH1 and IDH2 mutations. Further research must be done to prove the efficacy of epigenetic treatments, but the development of new epigenetic therapies along with immunotherapies holds potential in the future treatment of AML.

=== In pregnancy ===
Acute myeloid leukemia is rare in pregnancy, affecting about 1 in 75,000 to 100,000 pregnant women. It is diagnosed and treated similarly to AML in non-pregnancy, with a recommendation that it is treated urgently. However, treatment has significant implications for the pregnancy. First-trimester pregnancy is considered unlikely to be viable; pregnancy during weeks 24 – 36 requires consideration of the benefits of chemotherapy to the mother against the risks to the fetus; and there is a recommendation to consider delaying chemotherapy in very late pregnancy (> 36 weeks).

== Prognosis ==
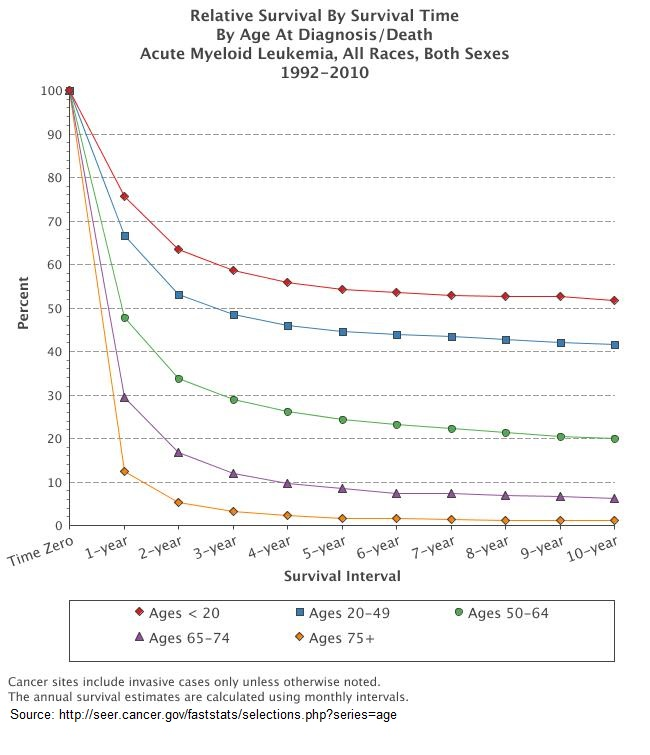
Expected survival upon diagnosis of acute myeloid leukemia in the United States

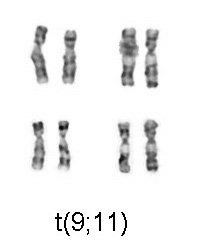
Chromosomal translocation (9;11), associated with AML

Multiple factors influence prognosis in AML, including the presence of specific mutations and a person's age with AML. In the United States between 2011 and 2016, the median survival of a person with AML was 8.5 months, with the 5-year survival being 24%. This declines with age, with the poorer prognosis being associated with an age greater than 65 years, and the poorest prognosis seen in those aged 75–84.

As of 2001, cure rates in clinical trials have ranged from 20 to 45%; although clinical trials often include only younger people and those able to tolerate aggressive therapies. The overall cure rate for all people with AML (including the elderly and those unable to tolerate aggressive therapy) is likely lower. Cure rates for APL can be very high in some clinical trials.

As of 2021, "[I]n APL, therapy with all-trans retinoic acid and arsenic trioxide results in estimated 10-year survival rates of ≥80% ... Ongoing research in acute myeloid leukemia (AML) is progressing rapidly". Arsenic trioxide and ATRA are the "most effective anti-APL agents" as shown by studies from China, India, and Iran.

=== Subtypes ===
Secondary AML has a worse prognosis, as does treatment-related AML arising after chemotherapy for another previous malignancy. Both of these entities are associated with a high rate of unfavorable genetic mutations.

=== Cytogenetics ===
Different genetic mutations are associated with different outcomes. Certain cytogenetic abnormalities are associated with very good outcomes (for example, the (15;17) translocation in APL). About half of people with AML have "normal" cytogenetics lacking identifiable translocations or other large-scale anomalies; they fall into an intermediate risk group. Several other cytogenetic abnormalities are known to be associated with a poor prognosis and a high risk of relapse after treatment.

A large number of molecular alterations are under study for their prognostic impact in AML. However, only FLT3-ITD, NPM1, CEBPA, and c-KIT are currently included in validated international risk stratification schemas. These are expected to increase rapidly in the near future. FLT3 internal tandem duplications (ITDs) have been shown to confer a poorer prognosis in AML with normal cytogenetics. Several FLT3 inhibitors have undergone clinical trials, with mixed results. Two other mutations – NPM1 and biallelic CEBPA are associated with improved outcomes, especially in people with normal cytogenetics, and are used in current risk stratification algorithms.

Researchers are investigating the clinical significance of c-KIT mutations in AML. These are prevalent, and potentially clinically relevant because of the availability of tyrosine kinase inhibitors, such as imatinib and sunitinib that can block the activity of c-KIT pharmacologically. It is expected that additional markers (e.g., RUNX1, ASXL1, and TP53) that have consistently been associated with an inferior outcome will soon be included in these recommendations. The prognostic importance of other mutated genes (e.g., DNMT3A, IDH1, IDH2) is less clear.

=== Other prognostic factors ===
Elevated lactate dehydrogenase levels were also associated with poorer outcomes. Use of tobacco is associated with a person having a poorer prognosis, and people who are married and live together have a better prognosis. People who are treated at a place with a higher volume of AML have a better prognosis than those who are treated at those in the lowest quartile. As with most forms of cancer, performance status (i.e. the general physical condition and activity level of the person) plays a major role in prognosis as well.

For people in remission after induction chemotherapy, residual leukemic cells (minimal residual disease) are associated with higher relapse rates and decreased survival. Furthermore, the presence of specific leukemic cells that are capable of initiating a relapse, the leukemia stem cell (a type of cancer stem cell) is associated with impaired survival and higher incidence of relapse.

== Epidemiology ==
AML is a relatively rare cancer. There were 19,950 new cases in the United States in 2016. In 2018, AML accounted for 1.2% of all cancer deaths in the United States.

The incidence of AML increases with age and varies between countries. The median age when AML is diagnosed ranges between 63 and 71 years in the UK, Canada, Australia, and Sweden, compared with 40 to 45 years in India, Brazil, and Algeria.

According to 2002 statistics, AML accounts for about 90% of all acute leukemias in adults and is rare in children. Acute leukemias consist of serious medical conditions relating to an original diagnosis of leukemia, where the abnormal blood cells are immature blood cells (blasts). They are mostly classified in terms of myeloid cells or lymphoid cells.

Based on data from United States Cancer Statistics (USCS) Public Use Database for 2001–2017, the 2021 estimate for new cases of AML and acute lymphoblastic leukemia (ALL) are following:

- Total estimated cases for AML: 20,240
- Total estimated cases for ALL: 5,690

The rate of therapy-related AML (AML caused by previous chemotherapy) is expected to rise with an increase in the use of chemotherapy, an aging population and more patients surviving their initial chemotherapy treatment; therapy-related disease accounts for just under 10% of all cases of AML. AML is slightly more common in men, with a male-to-female ratio of 1.3:1 to 1.4:1. Incidence is also seen to differ by ethnicity, with caucasians having higher recorded incidences and the lowest recorded incidences being in Pacific Islanders and native Alaskans.

In the UK, AML accounts for 31% of all leukemia cases, and around 3,100 people were diagnosed with the disease each year in 2016–2018.

== History ==
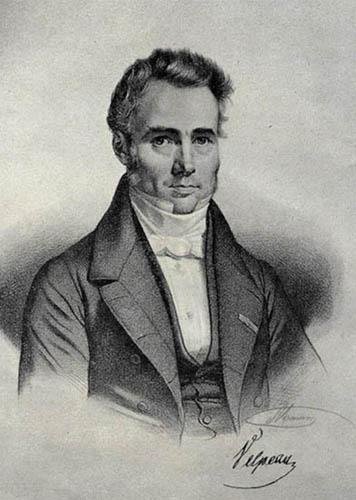
Alfred-Armand-Louis-Marie Velpeau

The first published description of a case of leukemia in medical literature dates to 1827, when French physician Alfred-Armand-Louis-Marie Velpeau described a 63-year-old florist who developed an illness characterized by fever, weakness, urinary stones, and substantial enlargement of the liver and spleen. Velpeau noted the blood of this person had a consistency "like gruel", and speculated the appearance of the blood was due to white corpuscles. In 1845, a series of people who died with enlarged spleens and changes in the "colors and consistencies of their blood" was reported by the Edinburgh-based pathologist J.H. Bennett; he used the term "leucocythemia" to describe this pathological condition.

The term "leukemia" was coined by Rudolf Virchow, the renowned German pathologist, in 1856. As a pioneer in the use of the light microscope in pathology, Virchow was the first to describe the abnormal excess of white blood cells in people with the clinical syndrome described by Velpeau and Bennett. As Virchow was uncertain of the etiology of the white blood cell excess, he used the purely descriptive term "leukemia" (Greek: "white blood") to refer to the condition.

Further advances in understanding AML occurred rapidly with the development of new technology. In 1877, Paul Ehrlich developed a technique of staining blood films, which allowed him to describe in detail normal and abnormal white blood cells. Wilhelm Ebstein introduced the term "acute leukemia" in 1889 to differentiate rapidly progressive and fatal leukemias from the more indolent chronic leukemias. The term "myeloid" was coined by Franz Ernst Christian Neumann in 1869, as he was the first to recognize white blood cells were made in the bone marrow (Greek: μυєλός, myelos, lit. '(bone) marrow') as opposed to the spleen. The technique of bone marrow examination to diagnose leukemia was first described in 1879 by Mosler. Finally, in 1900, the myeloblast, which is the malignant cell in AML, was characterized by Otto Naegeli, who divided the leukemias into myeloid and lymphocytic.

In 2008, AML became the first cancer genome to be fully sequenced. DNA extracted from leukemic cells was compared to that of unaffected skin. The leukemic cells contained acquired mutations in several genes that had not previously been associated with the disease.
