= Minimally differentiated acute myeloblastic leukemia =

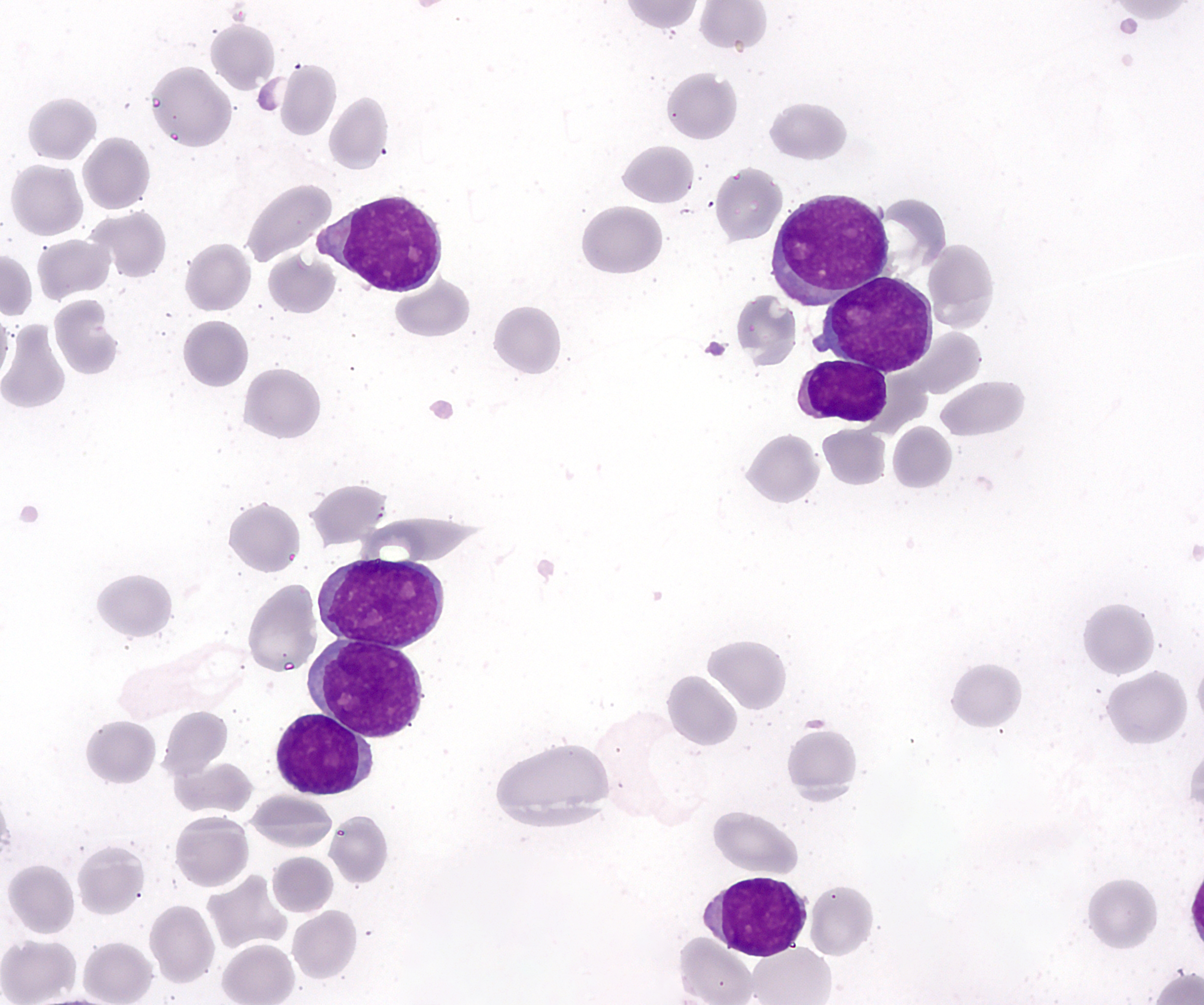
- The appearance of acute myeloblastic leukemia, M0 under microscope. Blasts show no Auer rods.
- Specialty: Hematology, oncology

Minimally differentiated acute myeloblastic leukemia is a subtype of AML. It is classified as M0 by FAB. It represents 2–3% of all cases of AML. Although minimally differentiated AML was recognized earlier, criteria for FAB M0 were developed in 1987. The blasts in these cases cannot be recognized as myeloid based on morphology and cytochemistry, but immunophenotyping demonstrates myeloid antigens.

== Cytochemistry and molecular features ==
In acute myeloblastic leukemia (M0), the blasts are agranular and nonreactive when stained for myeloperoxidase activity, and Auer rods are not seen. The blasts react with antibodies to myeloperoxidase and antibodies to CD13, CD33, and CD34. Human leukocyte antigen (HLA)-DR is positive in most patients. Occasional cases require in situ hybridization to identify the myeloperoxidase gene315 or genomic profiling for early myeloid-associated genes. Abnormal and unfavorable karyotypes (e.g., loss of the long arm of chromosome 5 (5q-) and 7q-) and higher expression of the multidrug resistance glycoprotein (p170) are frequent. In general, minimally differentiated acute myeloblastic leukemia has a poor prognosis.

== See also ==
- Acute myeloid leukemia
- Acute myeloblastic leukemia without maturation (M1 in FAB) — M9873/3
- Acute myeloblastic leukemia with maturation (M2 in FAB) — M9874/3
