= Induction =

Induction or inductive may refer to:

== Biology and medicine ==
- Enzyme induction and inhibition
- General anaesthesia
- Induction chemotherapy, in medicine
- Labor induction (of birth)

== Chemistry ==
- Induction period, slow stage of a reaction
- Inductive cleavage, in organic chemistry
- Inductive effect, change in electron density
- Asymmetric induction, preferring one stereoisomer over another

== Computing ==
- Grammar induction
- Inductive bias
- Inductive probability
- Inductive programming
- Rule induction
- Word-sense induction

== Mathematics ==
- Backward induction in game theory and economics
- Induced representation, in representation theory
- Mathematical induction, a method of proof
  - Strong induction
  - Structural induction
  - Transfinite induction
    - Epsilon-induction
- Parabolic induction

== Philosophy ==
- Inductive reasoning, in logic

== Physics ==
- Electromagnetic induction
- Electrostatic induction
- Forced induction, or turbocharging, of an engine

== Other uses ==
- Induction (play), an opening scene
- Induction (teachers), support of novice teachers
- Inductive reasoning aptitude
- Collective Induction, in psychology
- Hypnotic induction, causing hypnosis
- "Induction", a song by Broken Spindles from Fulfilled/complete
- "Induction" (short story), a short story by Greg Egan
- "Induction" (Industry), a 2020 television episode

== See also ==
- Inducement (disambiguation)
- Induce (disambiguation)
- Inductive data type (disambiguation)
- Deduction (disambiguation)
