= Acute (medicine) =

Disease with a rapid onset and/or a short course

In medicine, describing a disease as acute denotes that it is of recent onset; it occasionally denotes a short duration. The quantification of how much time constitutes "short" and "recent" varies by disease and by context, but the core denotation of "acute" is always qualitatively in contrast with "chronic", which denotes long-lasting disease (for example, in acute leukaemia and chronic leukaemia).

In the context of the mass noun "acute disease", it refers to the acute phase (that is, a short course) of any disease entity. For example, in an article on ulcerative enteritis in poultry, the author says, "in acute disease there may be increased mortality without any obvious signs", referring to the acute form or phase of ulcerative enteritis.

== Meaning variations ==
A mild stubbed toe is an acute injury. Similarly, many acute upper respiratory infections and acute gastroenteritis cases in adults are mild and usually resolve within a few days or weeks.

The term "acute" is also included in the definition of several diseases, such as severe acute respiratory syndrome, acute leukaemia, acute myocardial infarction, and acute hepatitis. This is often to distinguish diseases from their chronic forms, such as chronic leukaemia, or to highlight the sudden onset of the disease, such as acute myocardial infarct.

=== Related terminology ===
Related terms include:

Term	Meaning
Peracute	Very acute or violent. Denotes fulminant, whereas "acute" only sometimes connotes fulminant. Peracute ("very") is not to be confused with preacute ("before", the opposite of postacute).
Recurrent	"Happening again"—the concept is often one of multiple acute episodes. Relapse can mean the same as recurrent, although relapse is usually used to describe recurrence of chronic conditions that go into remission and then recur.
Acute on chronic	An acute exacerbation of a chronic condition. It is applied to a variety of conditions, including liver failure, subdural hematoma, renal failure, respiratory failure, and bronchitis.
Acute on chronic inflammation	A term sometimes used in pathology to describe a pattern of inflammation which is a mixture of chronic and acute inflammation. It may be seen in asthma, rheumatoid arthritis, chronic peptic ulcer, chronic periodontitis, tuberculosis, tonsillitis and other conditions.
Subacute	A vaguely defined state that is clearly not acute, but rather between acute and chronic, for example subacute endocarditis, or subacute sclerosing panencephalitis.
Chronic	A long-term condition.

== Acute care ==
Acute care is the early and specialist management of adult patients who have a wide range of medical conditions requiring urgent or emergency care usually within 48 hours of admission or referral from other specialties.

Acute hospitals are those intended for short-term medical and/or surgical treatment and care which is a medical speciality of acute medicine, as often primary care is not positioned to assume this role.
