= John Auer =

American physiologist and pharmacologist

- Born: March 30, 1875; Rochester, New York, U.S.
- Died: April 30, 1949 (aged 74); St. Louis, Missouri, U.S.
- Education: University of Michigan; Johns Hopkins Medical School
- Known for: Auer rods
- Spouse: Clara Meltzer-Auer
- Children: Helen, James, John
- Scientific career
- Fields: Physiology and Pharmacology
- Workplaces: Johns Hopkins Hospital Rockefeller Institute for Medical Research, Harvard Medical School St. Louis University Medical School

John Auer (March 30, 1875 – April 30, 1948) was an American physiologist and pharmacologist. He published nearly 150 papers during his career and is credited with the first description of Auer rods. Auer also contributed to the study of anaphylaxis and helped develop modern thoracic surgery. During World War I, he conducted wartime research with the Rockefeller Institute for Medical Research, in New York City.

== Education ==
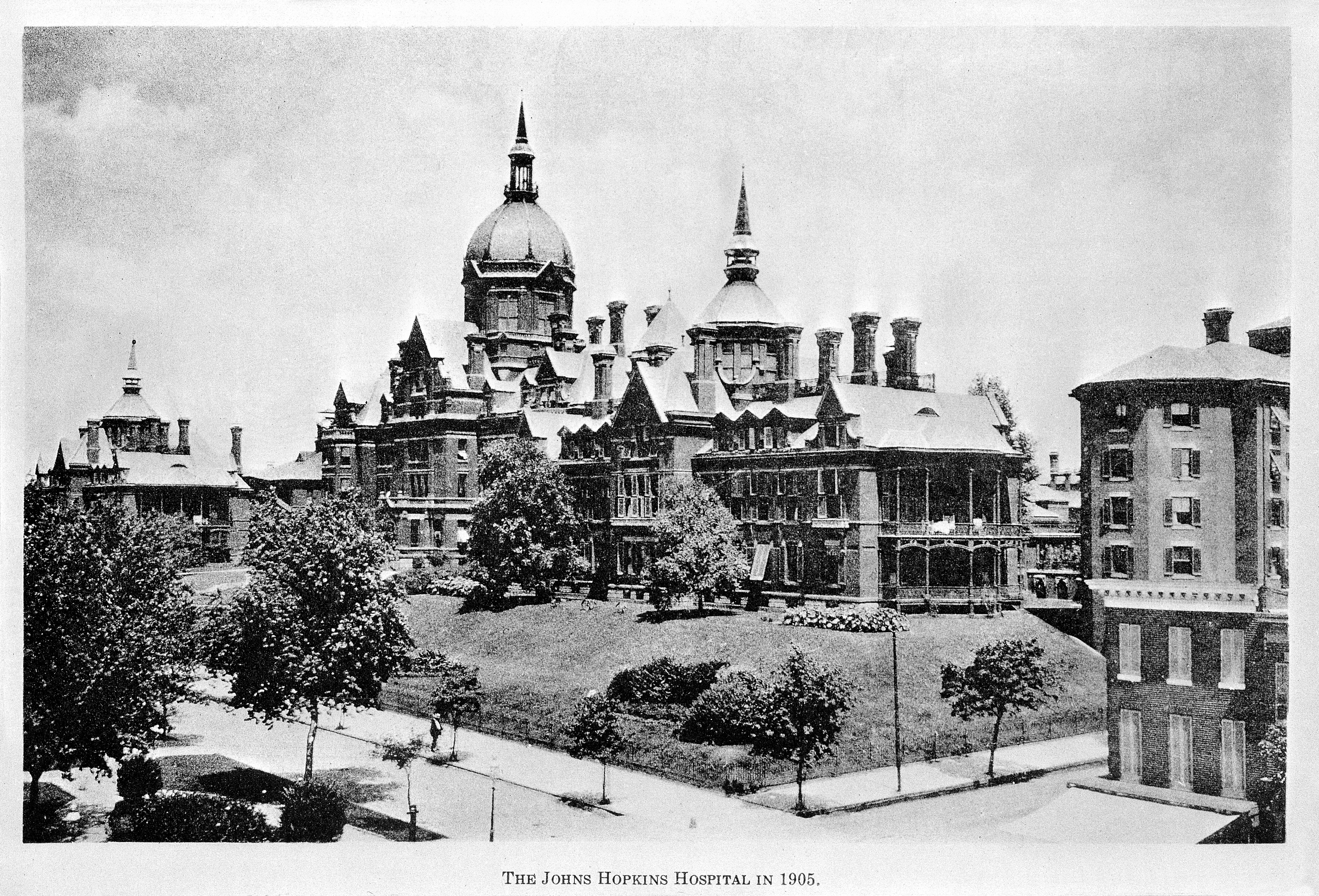
Johns Hopkins Hospital in 1905

John Auer attended the University of Michigan, where he received his B.S in 1898. In 1902, he received his M.D. from the Johns Hopkins University Medical School.

== Career ==
Following graduation from the Hopkins Medical School, Auer served as House Officer at the Johns Hopkins Hospital in 1902 & 1903. There, he spent time in the ward of Dr. William Osler.

In 1903, Auer began at the Rockefeller Institute for Medical Research as a Research Fellow in the laboratory of Dr. Samuel J. Meltzer, head of the physiology and pharmacology departments. Like many other physicians, Auer was likely attracted there by his interests in research and education. Between 1906 and 1907 he was sent to Harvard Medical School as an Instructor in Physiology so that he could become further specialized in the subject. Returning to New York in 1907, Auer became an Assistant in Physiology at the Rockefeller Institute. He was later promoted to Associate, and finally to Associate Member in Physiology and Pharmacology, a position he held from 1909 to 1921. While at the Rockefeller Institute, he also served as a NY physician. During WWI he was a Major in the Army Reserve Corps and contributed to wartime research conducted at the Rockefeller Institute.

In 1921, Auer became a Professor of Pharmacology at the St. Louis University School of Medicine. He later became Departmental Chairman and took up a position as Pharmacologist to the St. Mary's Hospital in St. Louis. He maintained these positions until his death in 1948. During his time in St. Louis, Auer focused on teaching rather than research. In response to his death, the Administrative Board of the St. Louis School of Medicine published a resolution stating he was "a scholar of the broadest interests and a human being of the highest nobility."

== Private life ==
John Auer was born in Rochester, New York.

While working at the Rockefeller Institute, he met Clara Meltzer, a fellow researcher in the laboratory and daughter of Samuel Meltzer. John and Clara were married in 1903, at which point she discontinued her work in academia. John and Clara had three children; Helen, James and John.

Auer enjoyed painting as a hobby and was a fan of Henri Matisse. He was also an adept gardener.

John Auer died in St. Mary's Hospital in St. Louis, Missouri from a heart attack.

== Research contributions ==
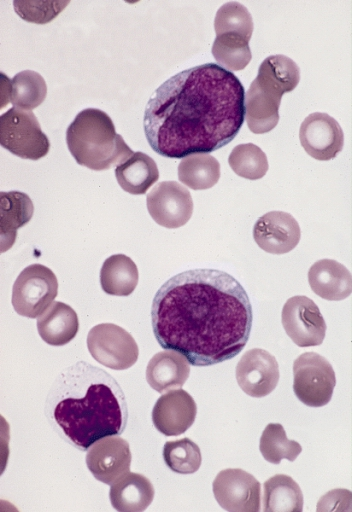
Auer Rods

=== Auer rods ===
In 1903 while working in Osler's ward at the Johns Hopkins Hospital, Auer noticed a 21 year old man with a severe nose bleed, throat infection, anemia, and splenomegaly. Upon examination of the young man's blood, Auer noticed needle-like rod forms in some cells, which he believed were lymphocytes. These rods would come to be known as Auer rods. It has since been shown that Auer rods are found in myeloid cells, and it is now thought that they are formed from fused lysosomes. Auer rods are found only in neoplastic cells and are used in the diagnosis of acute promyelocytic leukemia, though they do not indicate the prognosis of a patient.

There is some controversy in the eponymous nature of Auer rods. Auer is credited with the first descriptions and illustrations of Auer rods in his 1906 publication, "Some hitherto undescribed structures found in the large lymphocytes of a case of acute leukemia." As acknowledged by Auer in the paper, the inclusions had been previously noted in a paper authored by Thomas McCrae. Auer also acknowledged McCrae's kindness for supplying Auer with clinical notes on the phenomena. In his paper, McCrae had foretold of Auer's coming publication and more detailed description of the subject. For his contributions, some stipulate that Auer rods should rather be named McCrae-Auer rods.

=== Anaphylaxis ===
In Meltzer's laboratory at the Rockefeller Institute, John Auer and Paul Lewis were the first to recognize asphyxiation as the cause of death in anaphylaxis. Before Auer and Lewis's studies, it was believed that anaphylaxis was a reaction of the central nervous system. In pithing the guinea pigs used in their study, Auer and Lewis were able to show that the peripheral nervous system was responsible for the onset of anaphylaxis. They hypothesized that the asphyxiation observed was the result of bronchial spasms. Operating on this idea, they administered atropine to suppress such spasms, and found this treatment to be effective.

=== Thoracic surgery ===
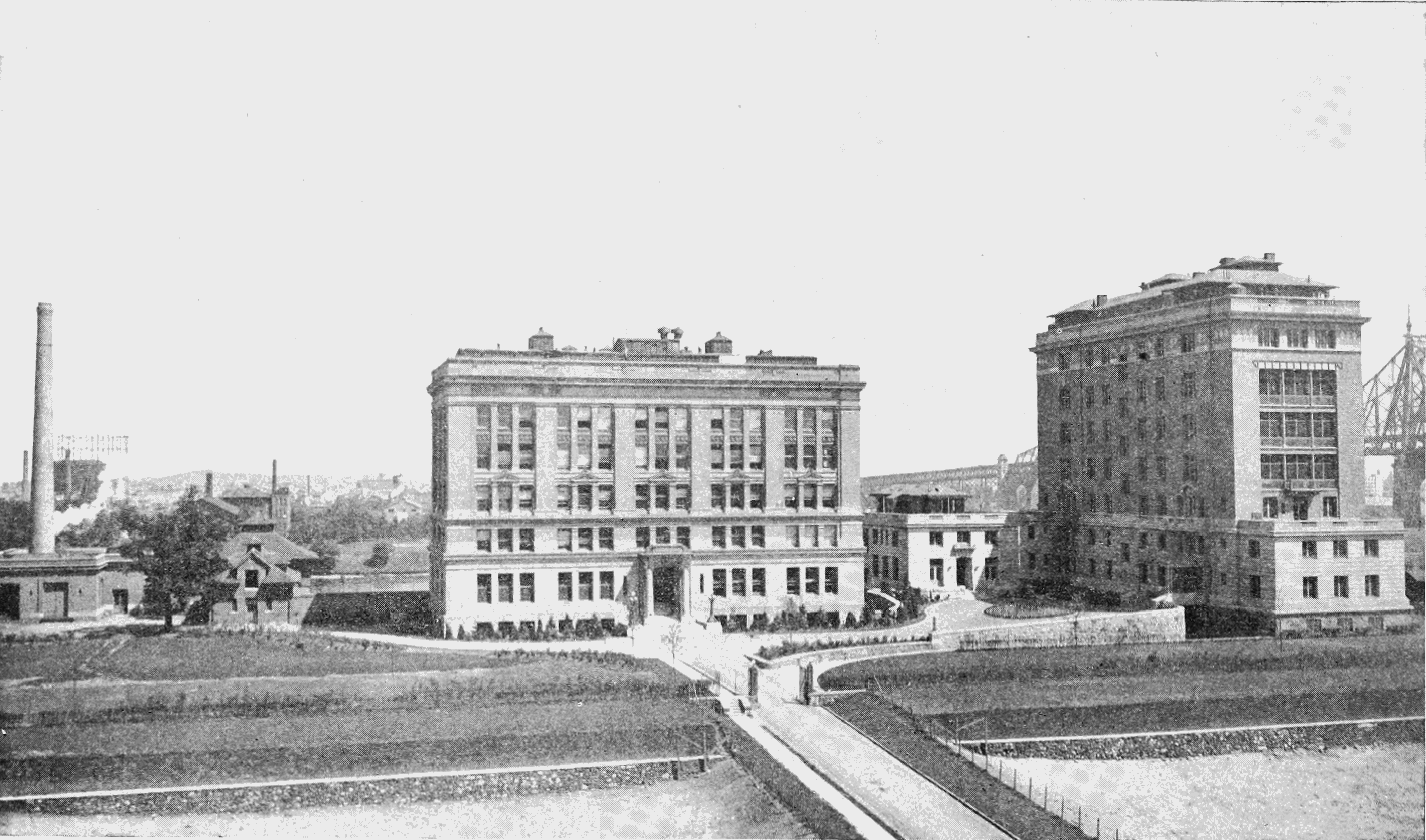
The Rockefeller Institute for Medical Research

In 1908, Auer and Meltzer began studying magnesium sulfate and its application as an anesthetic. They found that injection of the compound would result in a loss of consciousness and total muscle relaxation. Coupled with the continuous inflation of the lungs via an endotracheal tube, one could maintain ventilation of the body while immobilizing the chest. The patient could then be roused from their unconscious state by the administration of calcium chloride. The application was recognized and further developed by Nobel laureate and Rockefeller colleague Alexis Carrel. Carrel used the techniques set forth by Auer and Meltzer to develop the modern methods of thoracic surgery.

=== Wartime research ===
During World War I, the Rockefeller Institute for Medical Research was appointed as the United States Army Auxiliary Laboratory, and its focus was adjusted to aid in the war effort. Conducting such research, Auer was the first to establish intravenous magnesium sulfate as a treatment for the convulsions of tetanus. He also performed a pharmacological study of the poisonous gases dimethylsulphate and chlorpicrin on cats.

=== Auer's phenomenon ===
Auer was the first to describe swelling as an allergic reaction caused by xylene, which he observed by experimenting on rabbits.

== Medical and scientific societies ==
John Auer was a member of the following societies and organizations:

- American Society for Pharmacology and Experimental Therapeutics (Secretary 1912-1917, President 1924-1927)
- Association of American Physicians
- Society for Experimental Biology and Medicine (Vice President 1917-1918)
- American Physiological Society
- American Association for the Advancement of Science
- Harvey Society
- St. Louis Academy of Sciences
- St. Louis Medical Society
- honorary membership in the St. Louis Society of Anesthesiologists
- Association of Military Surgeons of the United States

== Publications ==
- Meltzer, S. J.; Auer, John (1905-10-02). "PHYSIOLOGICAL AND PHARMACOLOGICAL STUDIES OF MAGNESIUM SALTS.—I. GENERAL ANÆSTHESIA BY SUBCUTANEOUS INJECTIONS". American Journal of Physiology. Legacy Content. 14 (4): 366–388
- Auer, J. SOME HITHERTO UNDESCRIBED STRUCTURES FOUND IN THE LARGE LYMPHOCYTES OF A CASE OF ACUTE LEUKAEMIA. The American Journal of the Medical Sciences (1827-1924), 131(6), 1002.
- Meltzer, S. J.; Auer, J. (1908-05-01). "THE ANTAGONISTIC ACTION OF CALCIUM UPON THE INHIBITORY EFFECT OF MAGNESIUM". American Journal of Physiology. Legacy Content. 21 (4): 400–419.
- S. J. Meltzer, John Auer; CONTINUOUS RESPIRATION WITHOUT RESPIRATORY MOVEMENTS . 'J Exp Med' 17 July 1909; 11 (4): 622–625
- John Auer, Paul A. Lewis; THE PHYSIOLOGY OF THE IMMEDIATE REACTION OF ANAPHYLAXIS IN THE GUINEA-PIG . 'J Exp Med' 14 March 1910; 12 (2): 151–175.
