= Inducement =

Inducement may refer to:

- Incentive, persuading a person to alter their behaviour
- Bribery, a gift to influence an official

== See also ==
- Inducement prize contest, a competition to reward a feat, usually of engineering
- Inducement rule, a copyright test used in United States courts
- Induce (disambiguation)
- Induction (disambiguation)
