= Acute basophilic leukemia =

- Specialty: Hematology and oncology
- Frequency: 0.0001%

Acute basophilic leukemia (ABL) is a very rare & clinically aggressive subtype of acute myeloid leukemia (AML) designated by the WHO as a distinct entity within the subcategory of AML, Not Otherwise Specified (NOS), which accounts for roughly 4-5% of all "acute non-lymphocytic" cases of leukemia. ABL can be either primary (sporadic) or secondary to an existing bone marrow neoplasm (commonly CML or AML with BCR-ABL1). In either case, the disease is characterized by rapid proliferation of abnormal basophils & immature blasts in the bone marrow and peripheral blood. This process interferes with normal blood cell production, giving rise to classic symptoms of AML & ultimately bone marrow failure. Given the role of basophils in coordinating histamine release during inflammatory reactions, those with ABL also typically experience symptoms of hyper-histaminemia which can manifest cutaneously & within the gastrointestinal tract.

== Signs and symptoms ==
Common clinical manifestations can include:

- hyper-histaminemia: urticaria, pruritus, edema, hyperpigmentation, lytic bone lesions
- gastrointestinal involvement: ulcers, dyspepsia, nausea, vomiting, diarrhea
- fever
- weight loss
- loss of appetite
- fatigue
- pallor
- easy bruising
- frequent infections
- organomegaly

== Genetic risk factors ==
Similar to other subtypes of AML, sporadic cases of ABL typically arise from genetic mutations disrupting normal hematopoiesis in the bone marrow. However, ABL to this point, lacks a defining genetic abnormality. Thus far, it has been found to be cytogenetically heterogeneous but frequently associated with Philadelphia chromosome in CML & AML with t(9;22) BCR-ABL1.

Recently, a particular translocation of interest has come into focus due to its recurrence in sporadic cases of ABL observed in male infants. The t(X;6)(p11;q23) translocation results in the formation of MYB-GATA1 fusion gene, which enhances the expression of cellular markers of immaturity, such as CD34 and limit further differentiation. Expression of this fusion gene also directly activates the transcription of two important cell membrane receptors. When active, NTRK1 (neurotrophic receptor tyrosine kinase 1) and IL-1RL1 (ligands of IL-1 receptor-like 1) induce myeloblasts to differentiate into basophils, which likely contributes to the profound basophilia observed in cases of ABL.

== Diagnosis ==
Comprehensive clinical workup for ABL can include any of the following: complete blood count (CBC), serum chemistries, inflammatory markers (ESR/CRP), bone marrow aspiration + biopsy, immunohistochemical stains, electron microscopy, immunophenotyping, peripheral blood smear, chromosomal analysis + FISH panel to rule out MDS/MPD, molecular studies & cytogenic analysis, reverse transcription(RT)-PCR to evaluate for presence of BCR-ABL1, JAK2 & other oncogenic mutations, and CT scan to evaluate for organomegaly/LN involvement.

Consensus diagnostic criteria of ABL, as specified according to the AML subtypes, defined by differentiation markers according to the WHO:

Blasts & immature/mature basophils with metachromasia on toluidine blue staining
Blasts are negative for cytochemical MPO, SBB, and NSE
No expression of strong CD117 equivalent (to exclude mast cell leukemia)
≥20% blasts in bone marrow and/or peripheral blood*
Criteria for AML types with defined genetic alterations are not met*
Criteria for mixed-phenotype acute leukemia are not met (relevant for AML with minimal differentiation)*
Not fulfilling diagnostic criteria for myeloid neoplasm post cytotoxic therapy*
No prior history of myeloproliferative neoplasm*
(*) indicates criteria shared by all groups within this subclass

Another proposed diagnostic criteria of basophilic leukemia that subcategorizes the disease as either acute (ABL) vs chronic (CBL), based on the percentage of blasts (myeloblasts and metachromatic blasts) in the BM & PB.

Acute Basophilic Leukemia:

hyperbasophilia (persistent peripheral basophil count ⩾ 1000 per μl of blood)
percentage of basophils ≥ 40% of total leukocytes in bone marrow or peripheral blood
myeloblasts + metachromatic blasts ≥ 20% of total leukocytes in bone marrow or peripheral blood

Chronic Basophilic Leukemia:

hyperbasophilia (persistent peripheral basophil count ⩾ 1000 per μl of blood)
percentage of basophils ≥ 40% of total leukocytes in bone marrow or peripheral blood
myeloblasts + metachromatic blasts < 20% of total leukocytes in bone marrow or peripheral blood

== Treatment ==
Given the aggressive nature of ABL, patients will likely need stem cell transplant. Those patients who are not candidates for transplant require chemotherapy or targeted immunotherapy in combination with prophylactic antihistamines agents for symptomatic support.

== Prognosis ==
Given the rarity of this disease, little information is available to provide a definitive prognosis. However, the few studies done to this point indicate the overall prognostic outlook for ABL to be very poor. Survival time ranges from 2-16 months.
