= Induce =

Induce may refer to:

- Induced consumption
- Induced innovation
- Induced character
- Induced coma
- Induced menopause
- Induced metric
- Induced path
- Induced topology
- Induce (musician), American musician
- Labor induction, stimulation of childbirth

== See also ==
- Inducement (disambiguation)
- Induction (disambiguation)
