= CBFA2T2 =

Protein found in humans

Identifiers
- Aliases: CBFA2T2, EHT, MTGR1, ZMYND3, p85, CBFA2/RUNX1 translocation partner 2, CBFA2/RUNX1 partner transcriptional co-repressor 2
- External IDs: OMIM: 603672; MGI: 1333833; GeneCards: CBFA2T2

Gene location (Human)
Chr.	Chromosome 20 (human)
Band	20q11.21-q11.22	Start	33,490,075 bp
Band	20q11.21-q11.22	End	33,650,036 bp

Gene location (Mouse)
Chr.	Chromosome 2 (mouse)
Band	2|2 H1	Start	154,278,401 bp
Band	2|2 H1	End	154,381,276 bp
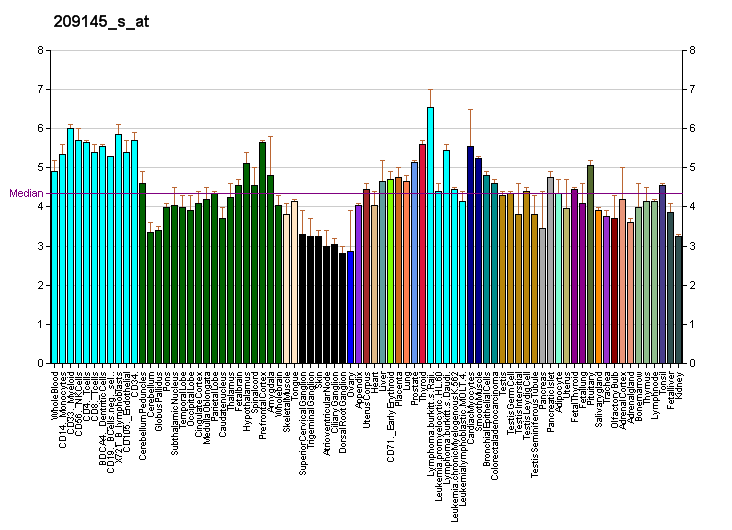

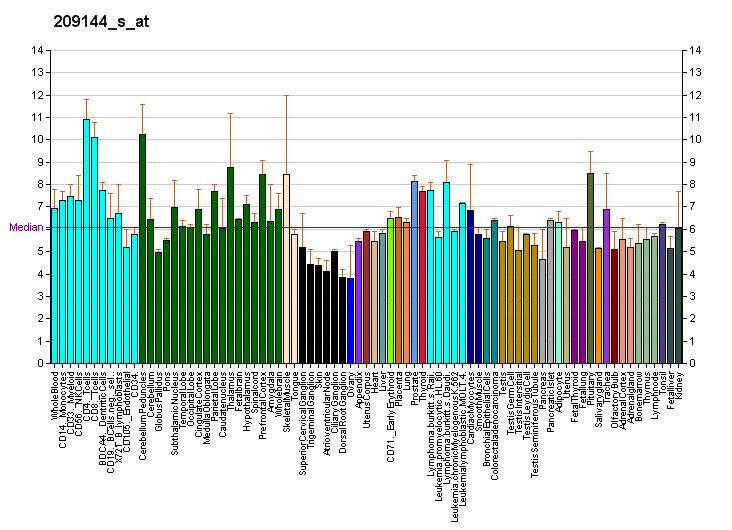

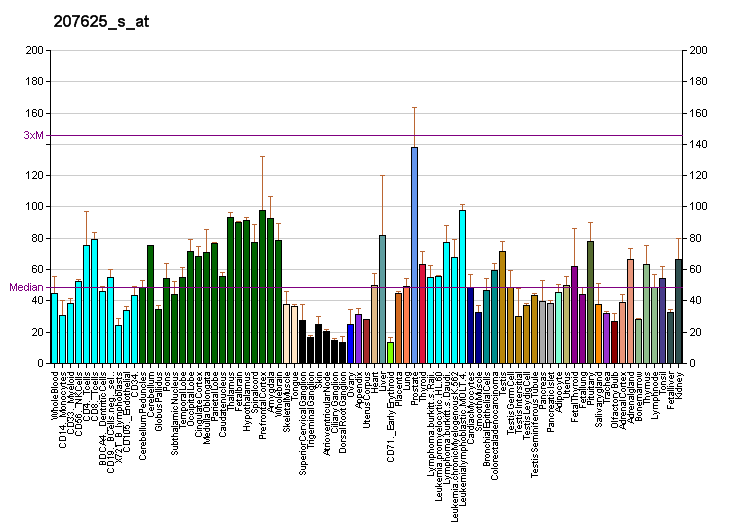
RNA expression pattern
Bgee	Human / Mouse (ortholog); Top expressed in: buccal mucosa cell; ganglionic eminence; middle temporal gyrus; sural nerve; lateral nuclear group of thalamus; pars reticulata; external globus pallidus; tendon of biceps brachii; prostate; subthalamic nucleus / Top expressed in: substantia nigra; Paneth cell; ventricular zone; fossa; barrel cortex; ganglionic eminence; cingulate gyrus; condyle; epithelium of lens; tail of embryo; More reference expression data
BioGPS	More reference expression data
Gene ontology
Molecular function	DNA-binding transcription factor activity; protein binding; transcription corepressor activity; metal ion binding
Cellular component	nucleus
Biological process	negative regulation of neuron projection development; negative regulation of transcription, DNA-templated; regulation of transcription, DNA-templated; epithelial cell differentiation; transcription, DNA-templated; positive regulation of neuron projection development; negative regulation of transcription by RNA polymerase II; negative regulation of Notch signaling pathway; intestinal epithelial cell differentiation
Sources:Amigo / QuickGO
Orthologs
Databases	NCBI: entry; OMA: entry
Species	Human	Mouse
Entrez	9139	12396
Ensembl	ENSG00000078699	ENSMUSG00000038533
UniProt	O43439	O70374
RefSeq (mRNA)	NM_001032999; NM_001039709; NM_005093; NM_175864	NM_001285446; NM_009823; NM_172860
RefSeq (protein)	NP_001028171; NP_001034798; NP_005084	NP_001272375; NP_033953; NP_766448
Location (UCSC)	Chr 20: 33.49 – 33.65 Mb	Chr 2: 154.28 – 154.38 Mb
PubMed search
- Wikidata
View/Edit Human	View/Edit Mouse

Protein CBFA2T2 is a protein that in humans is encoded by the CBFA2T2 gene.

== Function ==
In acute myeloid leukemia, especially in the M2 subtype, the t(8;21)(q22;q22) translocation is one of the most frequent karyotypic abnormalities. The translocation produces a chimeric gene made up of the 5′-region of the RUNX1 (AML1) gene fused to the 3'-region of the CBFA2T1 (MTG8) gene. The chimeric protein is thought to associate with the nuclear corepressor/histone deacetylase complex to block hematopoietic differentiation. The protein encoded by this gene binds to the AML1-MTG8 complex and may be important in promoting leukemogenesis. Several transcript variants are thought to exist for this gene, but the full-length natures of only three have been described.

== Interactions ==
CBFA2T2 has been shown to interact with RUNX1T1.
