= Ziftomenib =

Medication

Clinical data
- Trade names: Komzifti
- Other names: KO-539; KO539
- AHFS/Drugs.com: komzifti
- License data: US DailyMed: Ziftomenib
- Routes of administration: By mouth
- Drug class: Antineoplastic
- ATC code: None

Legal status
- Legal status: US: ℞-only

Identifiers
- IUPAC name: 4-Methyl-5-[[4-[[2-(methylamino)-6-(2,2,2-trifluoroethyl)thieno[2,3-d]pyrimidin-4-yl]amino]piperidin-1-yl]methyl]-1-[(2S)-2-(4-methylsulfonylpiperazin-1-yl)propyl]indole-2-carbonitrile
- CAS Number: 2134675-36-6
- PubChem CID: 138497449
- IUPHAR/BPS: 11680
- DrugBank: DB17171
- ChemSpider: 115009296
- UNII: 4MOD1F4ENC
- KEGG: D12419
- ChEMBL: ChEMBL5095038
- PDB ligand: K5O (PDBe, RCSB PDB)

Chemical and physical data
- Formula: C_{33}H_{42}F_{3}N_{9}O_{2}S_{2}
- Molar mass: 717.88 g·mol^{−1}
- 3D model (JSmol): Interactive image
- SMILES: CC1=C(C=CC2=C1C=C(N2C[C@H](C)N3CCN(CC3)S(=O)(=O)C)C#N)CN4CCC(CC4)NC5=C6C=C(SC6=NC(=N5)NC)CC(F)(F)F
- InChI: InChI=1S/C33H42F3N9O2S2/c1-21(43-11-13-44(14-12-43)49(4,46)47)19-45-25(18-37)15-27-22(2)23(5-6-29(27)45)20-42-9-7-24(8-10-42)39-30-28-16-26(17-33(34,35)36)48-31(28)41-32(38-3)40-30/h5-6,15-16,21,24H,7-14,17,19-20H2,1-4H3,(H2,38,39,40,41)/t21-/m0/s1; Key:BGGALFIXXQOTPY-NRFANRHFSA-N

Ziftomenib, sold under the brand name Komzifti, is an anti-cancer medication used for the treatment of acute myeloid leukemia. Ziftomenib is a menin inhibitor. It is taken by mouth.

Ziftomenib blocks the interaction between two proteins, menin (MEN1) and KMT2A (also known as mixed lineage leukemia protein, MLL).

Ziftomenib was approved for medical use in the United States in November 2025.

== Medical uses ==
Ziftomenib is indicated for the treatment of adults with relapsed or refractory acute myeloid leukemia with a susceptible nucleophosmin 1 mutation who have no satisfactory alternative treatment options.

== Adverse effects ==
The US prescribing information includes warnings and precautions for differentiation syndrome, QTc interval prolongation, and embryo-fetal toxicity.

== History ==
Efficacy was evaluated in KO-MEN-001 (NCT04067336), an open-label, single, arm, multi-center trial in 112 adults with relapsed or refractory acute myeloid leukemia with an nucleophosmin 1 mutation identified using next-generation sequencing or polymerase chain reaction. Participants with nucleophosmin 1 mutations, including type A, B, and D mutations and other nucleophosmin 1 mutations likely to result in cytoplasmic localization of the nucleophosmin 1 protein, were enrolled.

The US Food and Drug Administration granted the application for ziftomenib priority review, breakthrough therapy, and orphan drug designations.

== Society and culture ==
=== Legal status ===
Ziftomenib was approved for medical use in the United States in November 2025.

=== Names ===
Ziftomenib is the international nonproprietary name.

Ziftomenib is sold under the brand name Komzifti.
