= RUNX1T1 =

Protein-coding gene in humans

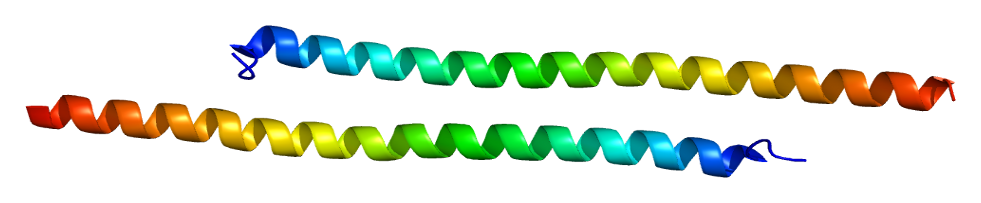

Identifiers
- Aliases: RUNX1T1, AML1T1, CBFA2T1, CDR, ETO, MTG8, ZMYND2, AML1-MTG8, t(8;21)(q22;q22), RUNX1 translocation partner 1, RUNX1 partner transcriptional co-repressor 1
- External IDs: OMIM: 133435; MGI: 104793; GeneCards: RUNX1T1
Available structures
| PDB | Ortholog search: PDBe RCSB |
| PDB | List of PDB id codes 1WQ6, 2DJ8, 2H7B, 2KYG, 2OD1, 2ODD, 2PP4, 4JOL |

Gene location (Human)
| Chr. | Chromosome 8 (human) |
| Band | 8q21.3 | Start | 91,954,967 bp |
| Band | 8q21.3 | End | 92,103,286 bp |

Gene location (Mouse)
| Chr. | Chromosome 4 (mouse) |
| Band | 4 A1|4 5.88 cM | Start | 13,743,436 bp |
| Band | 4 A1|4 5.88 cM | End | 13,893,649 bp |
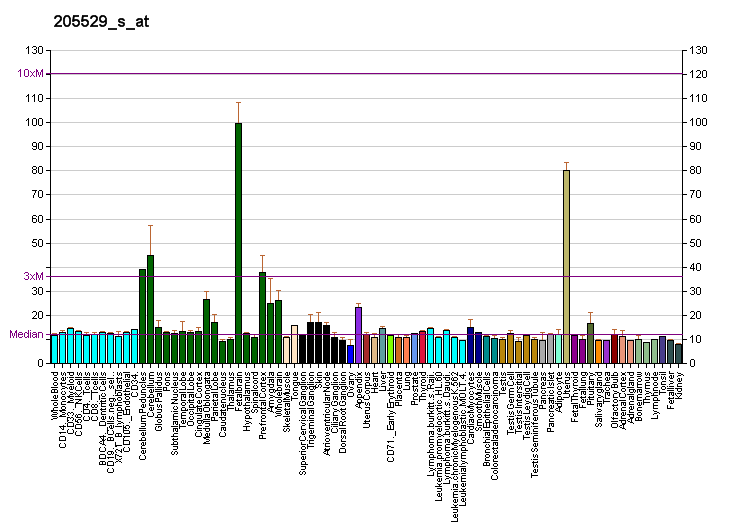

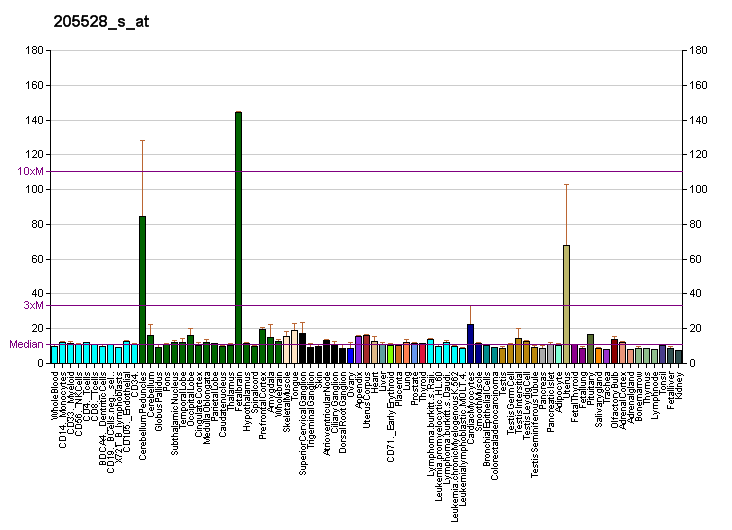

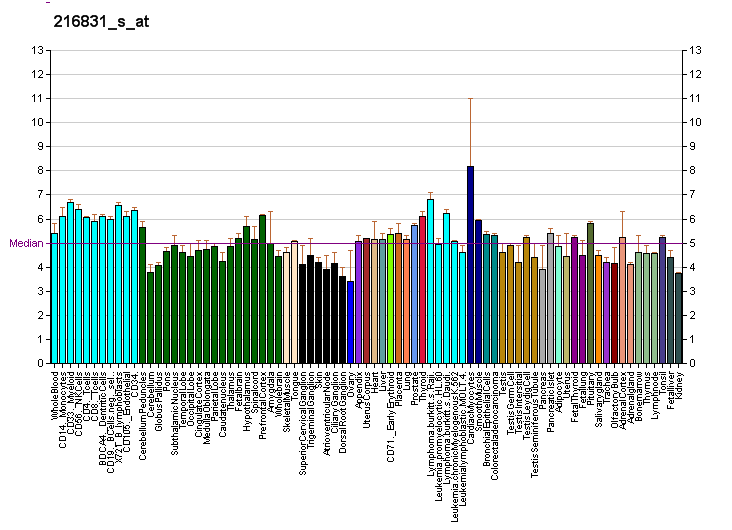
RNA expression pattern
| Bgee | Human / Mouse (ortholog); Top expressed in: secondary oocyte; sural nerve; buccal mucosa cell; tendon of biceps brachii; Brodmann area 23; Achilles tendon; paraflocculus of cerebellum; middle temporal gyrus; epithelium of colon; parietal pleura / Top expressed in: Rostral migratory stream; secondary oocyte; zygote; internal carotid artery; genital tubercle; external carotid artery; olfactory tubercle; ascending aorta; mammillary body; lateral hypothalamus; More reference expression data |
| BioGPS | More reference expression data |
Gene ontology
| Molecular function | DNA-binding transcription factor activity; DNA binding; protein binding; transcription corepressor activity; metal ion binding |
| Cellular component | nuclear matrix; nucleus; nucleoplasm |
| Biological process | negative regulation of fat cell differentiation; negative regulation of transcription, DNA-templated; regulation of transcription, DNA-templated; generation of precursor metabolites and energy; transcription, DNA-templated |
Sources:Amigo / QuickGO
Orthologs
| Databases | NCBI: entry; OMA: entry |
| Species | Human | Mouse |
| Entrez | 862 | 12395 |
| Ensembl | ENSG00000079102 | ENSMUSG00000006586 |
| UniProt | Q06455 | Q61909 |
| RefSeq (mRNA) | NM_001198625; NM_001198626; NM_001198627; NM_001198628; NM_001198629 NM_001198630; NM_001198631; NM_001198632; NM_001198633; NM_001198634; NM_001198679; NM_004349; NM_175634; NM_175635; NM_175636; NM_001395209 | NM_001111026; NM_001111027; NM_009822 |
| RefSeq (protein) | NP_001185554; NP_001185555; NP_001185556; NP_001185557; NP_001185558 NP_001185559; NP_001185560; NP_001185561; NP_001185562; NP_001185563; NP_001185608; NP_004340; NP_783552; NP_783553; NP_783554; NP_783553.1; NP_783554.1 | NP_001104496; NP_001104497; NP_033952 |
| Location (UCSC) | Chr 8: 91.95 – 92.1 Mb | Chr 4: 13.74 – 13.89 Mb |
| PubMed search |
- Wikidata
| View/Edit Human | View/Edit Mouse |

Protein CBFA2T1 is a protein that in humans is encoded by the RUNX1T1 gene.

== Function ==
The protein encoded by this gene is a putative zinc finger transcription factor and oncoprotein. In acute myeloid leukemia, especially in the M2 subtype, the t(8;21)(q22;q22) translocation is one of the most frequent karyotypic abnormalities. The translocation produces a chimeric gene made up of the 5′-region of the RUNX1 gene fused to the 3′-region of this gene. The chimeric protein is thought to associate with the nuclear corepressor/histone deacetylase complex to block hematopoietic differentiation. Several transcript variants encoding multiple isoforms have been found for this gene.

== Interactions ==
RUNX1T1 has been shown to interact with:

- CBFA2T2,
- CBFA2T3,
- Calcitriol receptor
- GFI1,
- Nuclear receptor co-repressor 1,
- Nuclear receptor co-repressor 2,
- PRKAR2A, and
- Zinc finger and BTB domain-containing protein 16.
