= Biphenotypic acute leukaemia =

Biphenotypic acute leukemia
- Other names: Acute biphenotypic leukemia
- Specialty: Oncology
- Symptoms: Lymphadenopathy, anemia
- Causes: virus, hereditary
- Diagnostic method: Bone marrow examination
- Treatment: Chemotherapy, stem cell therapy

Biphenotypic acute leukaemia (BAL) is an uncommon type of leukemia which arises in multipotent progenitor cells which have the ability to differentiate into both myeloid and lymphoid lineages. It is a subtype of "leukemia of ambiguous lineage".

The direct reasons leading to BAL are still not clear. BAL can be de novo or secondary to previous cytotoxic therapy. Many factors, such viruses, hereditary factors, and radiation, might have a relationship with BAL.

BAL is hard to treat. Usually the chemotherapy is chosen according to the morphology of the blast (ALL or AML). A blood-forming stem-cell transplantation is highly recommended. About 5% of acute leukaemia cases are BAL. BAL can occur in all ages of people but occurs more in adults than in children.

== Signs and symptoms ==
BAL has similar symptoms to other types of leukemia, but they are usually more serious.

Symptoms caused by bone marrow damage

Bruising, spotting: the reason is lack of platelets. it is very common in BAL patients, most of patients die due to the

A low level of red blood cells in the bloodstream: Because the decline of hematopoietic function, need blood transfusion therapy

Persistent fever, infection prolonged healing:

Diffuse hemorrhage: which is dangerous and might lead to death.

Symptoms caused by blood cancer cells infiltration into tissues:

Swollen lymph nodes

Joint pain

Swelling of the gums

Enlargement of the liver and spleen

Headache and vomiting: blood cancer infiltration into the wear performance of the central nervous system.

Skin lumps: Because look was slightly green, also known as the "Green tumor."

Pericardial or pleural effusion

== Causes ==
The cause that directly leads to BAL is unclear. Exposure to radiation, chemical exposure, virus and genetics are the primary reasons proposed by researchers.

== Mechanisms ==
The mechanism of BAL is related to several mutations. The most common abnormalities are t(9;22) and MLL gene rearrangement at 11q23.

T(9;22) affect the ABL gene at 9q34 and BCR at 22q11. The hybrid gene product ABL/BCR is an oncogene which could lead several types of leukemia including BAL. ABL/BCR could active several molecular pathways:

1. RAS signaling could be activated by BCR/ABL by GRB2 adaptor which interact with Y177 of BCR.
2. Through AKT/PKB, PI3-K pathway could also be activated.
3. STAT5, 1, and 6 has been reported that is a major molecular signaling event activated by BCR/ABL.
4. Some focal adhesion complex (PAXILLIN, FAK0 could be activated by BCR/ABL with adaptor molecule CRK-L.
5. BCR/ABL could inactivate negative regulatory molecules PTP1B and Abi-1. Their inactivation is related with progression into blast crisis.
6. BCR/ABL pathway could also active PI64K/Akt/STAT5 pathway which has anti-apoptotic activity.
7. BCR/ABL induce cell adhesive and migratory abnormalities because the mutation will lead an abnormal response to chemokine SDF-1

T(9,22) translocation

MLL gene encode Histone-lysine N-methyltransferase (HRX), which is a histone methyltransferase. It is a positive regulator for gene transcription. It has been shown that associates with Host cell factor C1, CREB binding protein, WDR5, CTBP, MEN1, etc. The rearrangement of MLL are related with different kinds of aggressive acute leukemias. Most of biphenotypic leukemia in children is due to the rearrangement of MLL

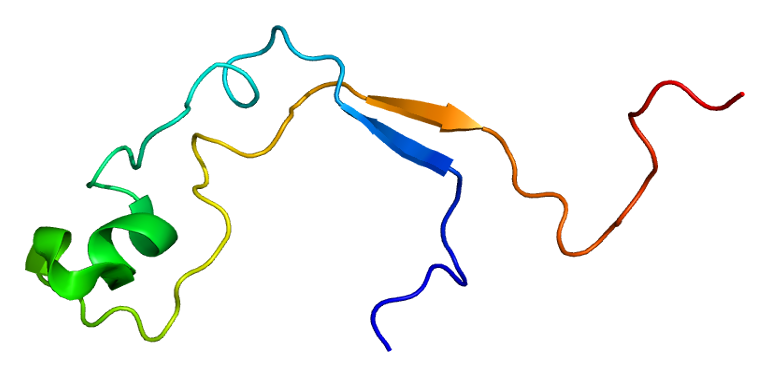
Protein MLL PDB 2j2s

Besides them, other gene abnormalities has been reported. Such as t(8;21), t(15;17), del(6q), del(12p), t(x;12) and t(14;19). In BAL patients, it is prone to bruising, spotting, which is due to megakaryocytes that could produce platelets decrease, resulting in a lack of platelets.

Anemia: reduction metrocytes that could produce red blood cells, resulting in a lack of red blood cells. Patients are prone to asthma and dizziness in walking or exercise.

Persistent fever, infection prolonged healing: Most of the white blood cells are leukemia cells, no normal function, leading to decreased immunity, susceptible to infection.

== Diagnosis ==
Following observation of the symptoms, the patients need to get complete blood counts and a bone marrow examination. If the patient has leukemia, the morphology and immunophenotype check is needed to make sure the type of leukemia.

The morphology of the blast in BAL is not certain. The cells could display both myeloid lineage and lymphoid or undifferentiated morphology. Therefore, the diagnosis cannot based on the morphology result. The immunophenotype check is the most important basis of the diagnosis of BAL.

Before 2008, the diagnosis of BAL was based on a score system proposed by the European Group for the Immunological Classification of Leukemias (EGIL) which could differentiate from other kinds of acute leukemia. The table shows this method. If the score of only one lineage is higher than 2, the acute leukemia could be acute myeloid leukemia (AML) or acute lymphoblastic leukemia (ALL). According to the original EGIL scoring system BAL is defined when scores are over two points for both myeloid and T- or B- lymphoid lineages.

In 2008, WHO established a new and strict criteria standard for diagnosis of BAL. The presence of specific T-lymphoid antigens, cytoplasmic CD3 (cCD3), MPO and CD 19 became the most important standard for recognizing the lineage. Other B-lineage markers (CD22, CD79a, CD 10) and monocytic markers are also needed. Table 2 shows the method.

Compared with the EGIL scoring system, the current 2008 WHO criteria applied less but more specific markers to define the lineage of the blasts, and incorporated the intensity of markers expression into the diagnostic algorithm. The diagnosis of BAL is so difficult that sometimes is misdiagnosed with AML or ALL because the morphology thus the therapy would not have a good effect.

== Treatment ==
BAL is difficult to treat, most patients receive treatment based on the morphology of blasts and get AML or ALL induction chemotherapy. The induction drug for AML such as cytarabine and anthracycline, drug for ALL such as prednisolone, dexamethasone, vincristine, asparaginase or daunorubicin is common for BAL remission induction therapy. Recently, researches showed that using both myeloid and lymphoid induction therapy may be better for prognosis. Chemotherapy has strong side effects such as typhlitis, gastrointestinal distress, anemia, fatigue, hair loss, nausea and vomiting, etc. Thus, the different dose and times of chemotherapy for different individuals is important.

If the patients enter fully remission, the consolidation with stem cell transplantation is highly recommended.

== Prognosis ==
The prognosis for BAL patients is not good which is worse than ALL and AML. Medical Blood Institute reported cases of CR rate was 31.6%, with a median remission are less than 6 months The median survival time is only 7.5 months. The life quality is also low because the immune function of patient is damaged seriously. They have to stay in hospital and need 24h care.

In another study, the results showed that young age, normal karyotype and ALL induction therapy will have a better prognosis than Ph+, adult patients. The study shows median survival of children is 139 months versus 11 months of adults, 139 months for normal karyotype patients versus 8 months for ph+ patients.

== Recent research ==
Research on the mechanisms of BAL does not show a great progress in terms of the causes, molecular processes and therapy. Some new translocate case of BAL has been reported, such as t(15,17) and t(12,13). For t(15;17), the blasts with morphology of acute lymphoblastic leukemia co-expressed in B-lymphoid and myeloid lineages, and the cytogenetic study showed that the 4q21 abnormalities and t(15;17). However, promyelocytic-retinoid acid receptor rearrangement was not found by fluorescence in situ hybridization on interphase nuclei. Researchers also found some new chemotherapy method for specific cases. For example, The chemotherapy for ALL and gemtuzuab ozogamicin without all-trans-retinoic acid remain complete remission of the BAL patients with t(15,17) for more than 3.7 years. The detection of BCR-ABL1 chimeric gene neutrophils was also found a good method for diagnosis some cases of BAL.
