= Deduction =

Deduction may refer to:

== Philosophy ==
- Deductive reasoning, the mental process of drawing inferences in which the truth of their premises ensures the truth of their conclusion
- Natural deduction, a class of proof systems based on simple and self-evident rules of inference that aim to closely mirror how reasoning actually occurs

== Taxation ==
- Tax deduction, variable tax dollars subtracted from gross income
  - Itemized deduction, eligible expense that individual taxpayers in the United States can report on their Federal income tax returns
  - Standard deduction, dollar amount that non-itemizers may subtract from their income

== Other uses ==
- English modals of deduction, English modal verbs to state how sure somebody is about something.
- Deduction (food stamps), used in the United States to calculate a household's monthly food stamp benefit goods

== See also ==
- Induction (disambiguation)
