= Inductive data type =

Inductive data type may refer to:

- Algebraic data type, a datatype each of whose values is data from other datatypes wrapped in one of the constructors of the datatype
- Inductive family, a family of inductive data types indexed by another type or value
- Recursive data type, a data type for values that may contain other values of the same type

== See also ==
- Inductive type
- Induction (disambiguation)
