= Collective Induction =

Task used for researching group problem solving

Collective induction is a task developed by Steiner and used in research on group problem solving. Broadly, the method entails "the cooperative search for descriptive, predictive, and explanatory generalizations, rules, and principles" among members in a group working on the same task. James Larson further defined collective induction tasks as "[tasks] in which problem solvers work cooperatively to induce a general rule or principle that can account parsimoniously for a given set of facts or observations" This particular process has been used to determine if groups are better problem solvers than individuals.

== Rule induction tasks ==
The most frequently used collective induction task is a task that requires participants to discern the pattern that a particular series of playing cards are laid in. The task experimenter first generates a rule about how cards should be laid. The rule may be determined based on any facet of the cards. For example, the pattern could be two red cards followed by a spade. The experimenter begins by laying a card that fits the rule. Then group members make suggestions for what card should be laid next. If the card fits the pattern, the experimenter places the card to the right of the previous correctly laid card. If the card does not fit the pattern, then the experimenter places it below the previous card. Participants work to discern the pattern. After ten rounds, participants are asked to propose their hypothesis about what the rule could be. Some modifications to this procedure have been used. For example, in some variations, groups are allowed to put forth multiple hypotheses and use multiple card displays.

Another, less widely used collective induction task also involves cards. In this task, four cards are used with the letters A or D on one side of the card and the numbers 4 or 7 on the other side. The cards are placed on the table to show one face of each letter and number. Participants are asked to determine the minimum number of cards they will need to turn over in order to determine if cards with vowels always have even numbers on their opposite side.

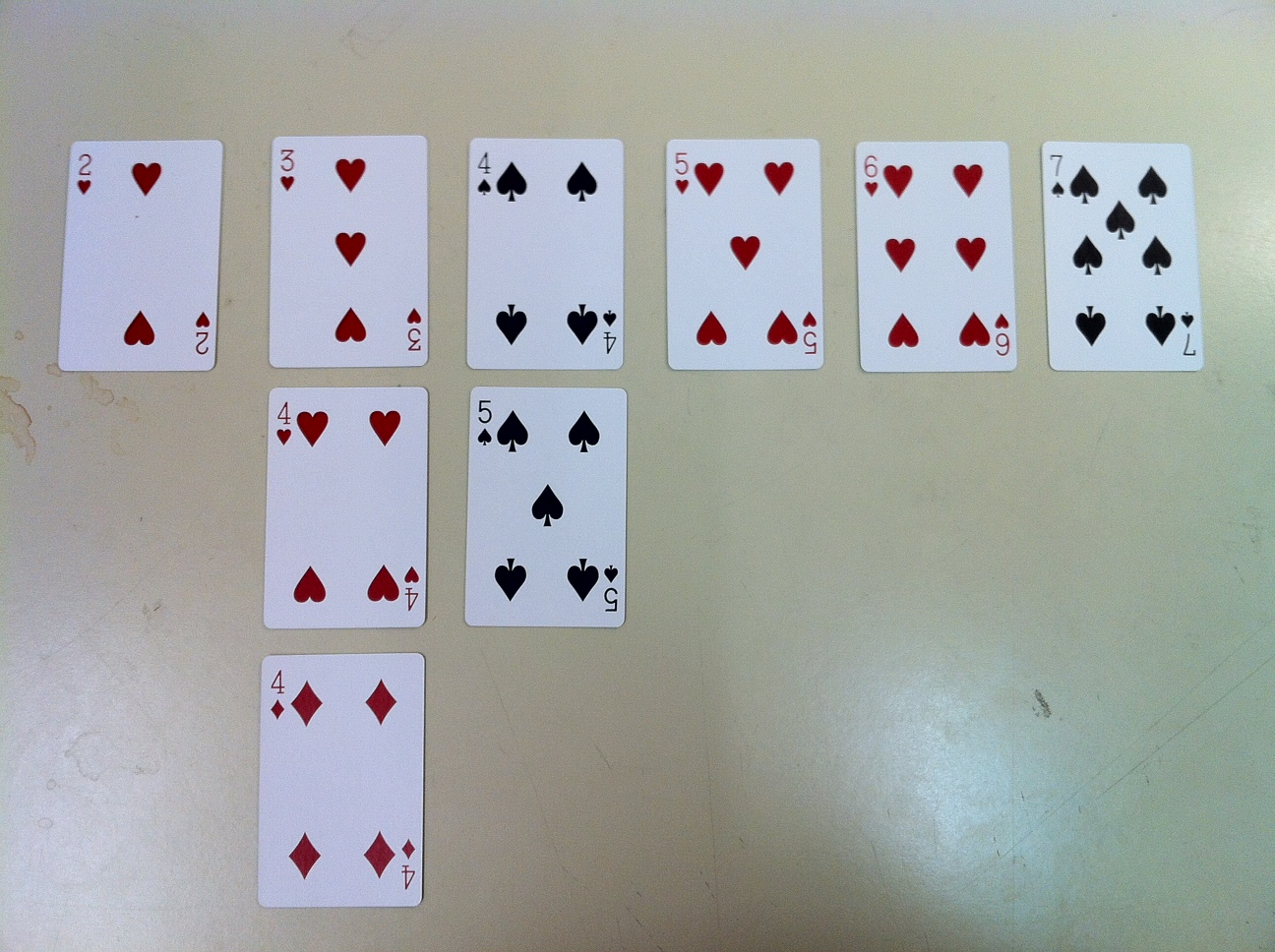
These cards are laid in a pattern following the 2 red cards, one spade rule.

== Do groups perform better than individuals? ==
This question has been tested by comparing group performance to the performance of individuals alone or in a nominal group, a group of individuals whose performance is grouped together even though they did not work together. For example, if groups of four worked on a task together, then researchers could see if they performed better than individuals by randomly combining the efforts of four individuals who worked on the same task independently. This allows researchers to assess the potential gains or losses caused by group interaction while recognizing that more people working on a task may be more likely to arrive at the solution by random chance. Group performance is compared against both the best performing individual in each nominal group (thus answering the question, "do groups perform better than all individuals?") and the average of all individual performances ("do groups perform better than average?"). Several experiments have sought to address this question and results have consistently suggested that groups perform better than the average individual though not as well as the best individual in nominal groups.

The first researchers to test if group performance is better than individual performance were Laughlin and Shippy in 1983. They found that groups performed better than individuals, proposing more plausible hypotheses and finding the correct rule with fewer rounds than individuals. However, this does not address whether individuals working cooperatively can perform better than the best member of a similarly sized nominal group. This was tested in three separate experiments by Laughlin and colleagues. In these studies, results indicated that groups working cooperatively performed about as well as the best individual in each nominal group and significantly better than the second, third, and worst members of the nominal group. No study to date has shown that groups perform better than the best member of a nominal group.

== Twelve postulates of collective induction tasks ==
As noted by Patrick Laughlin, there are twelve postulates of collective induction tasks. These rules are the result of years of research on collective induction tasks with groups and were originally published in the journal Organizational Behavior and Human Decision Processes. These twelve postulates compose a theory of collective induction.
