= Corpuscle =

Corpuscle (/ˈkɔːrpəsəl/) or corpuscule, meaning a "small body", is often used as a synonym for particle. It may also refer to:

- Corpuscularianism, the atomistic view that all physical objects are composed of corpuscles, which was dominant among 17th century European thinkers
- The corpuscular theory of light, developed by Isaac Newton in his Opticks, which proposed the existence of light particles which are now known as photons
- A term used by J. J. Thomson to describe particles now known to be electrons, in his plum pudding model
- A small free-floating biological cell, especially a blood cell
- A nerve ending such as Meissner's corpuscle or a Pacinian corpuscle
- A colloquial nickname for students at Corpus Christi College, Cambridge and/or Corpus Christi College, Oxford
