= Auer rod =

Crystalline cytoplasmic inclusion bodies

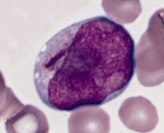
Myeloblast with an Auer rod (to the left of the nucleus).

Auer rods (or Auer bodies) are large, crystalline cytoplasmic inclusion bodies sometimes observed in myeloid blast cells during acute myeloid leukemia, acute promyelocytic leukemia, high-grade myelodysplastic syndromes and myeloproliferative disorders. Composed of fused lysosomes and rich in lysosomal enzymes, Auer rods are azurophilic and can resemble needles, commas, diamonds, rectangles, corkscrews, or (rarely) granules.

== Eponym ==
Although Auer rods are named for American physiologist John Auer, they were first described in 1905 by Canadian physician Thomas McCrae, then at Johns Hopkins Hospital, as Auer himself acknowledged in his 1906 paper. Both McCrae and Auer mistakenly thought that the cells containing the rods were lymphoblasts.

== Additional images ==
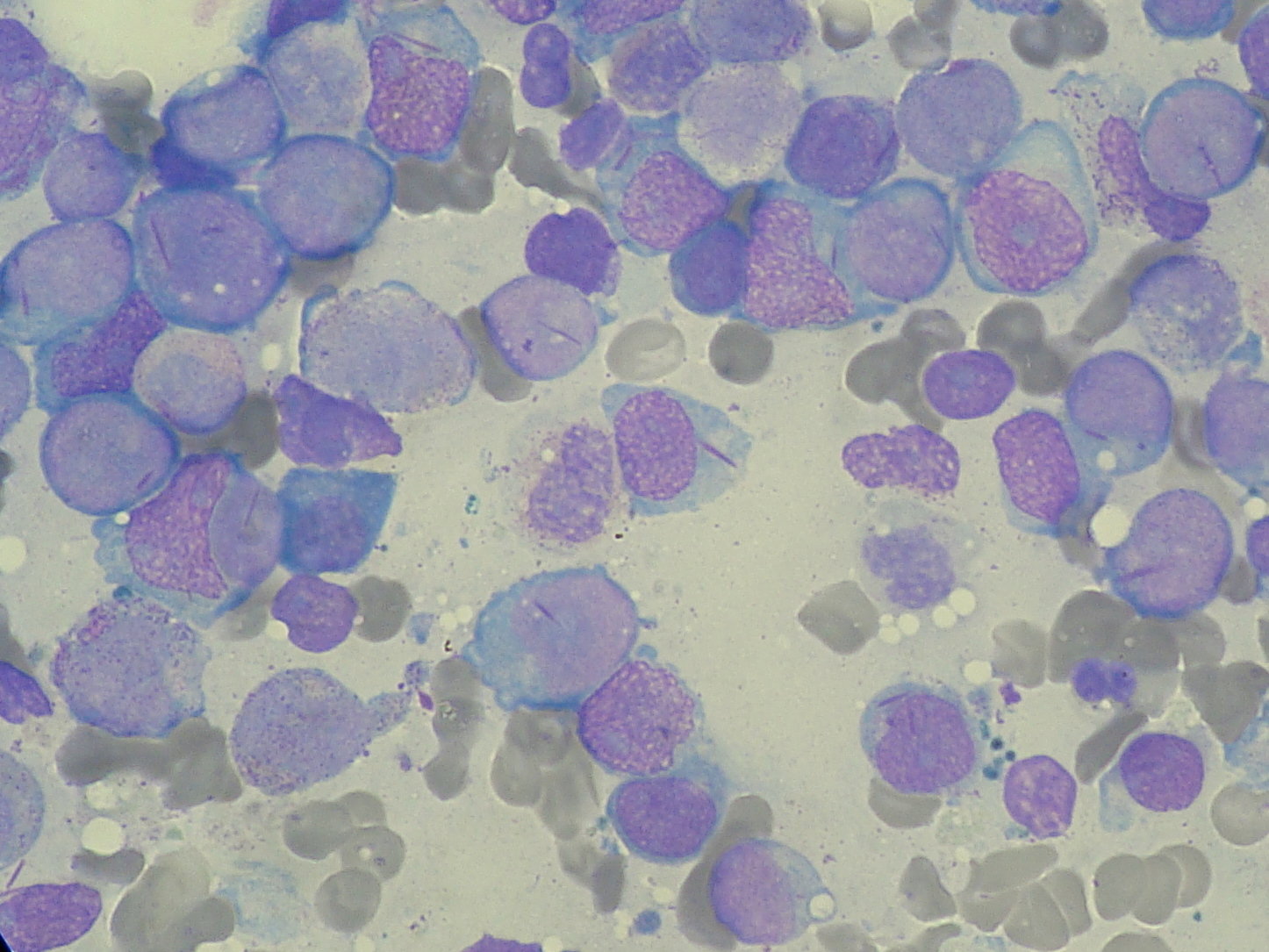
Bone marrow aspirate showing acute myeloid leukemia with Auer rods in several blasts

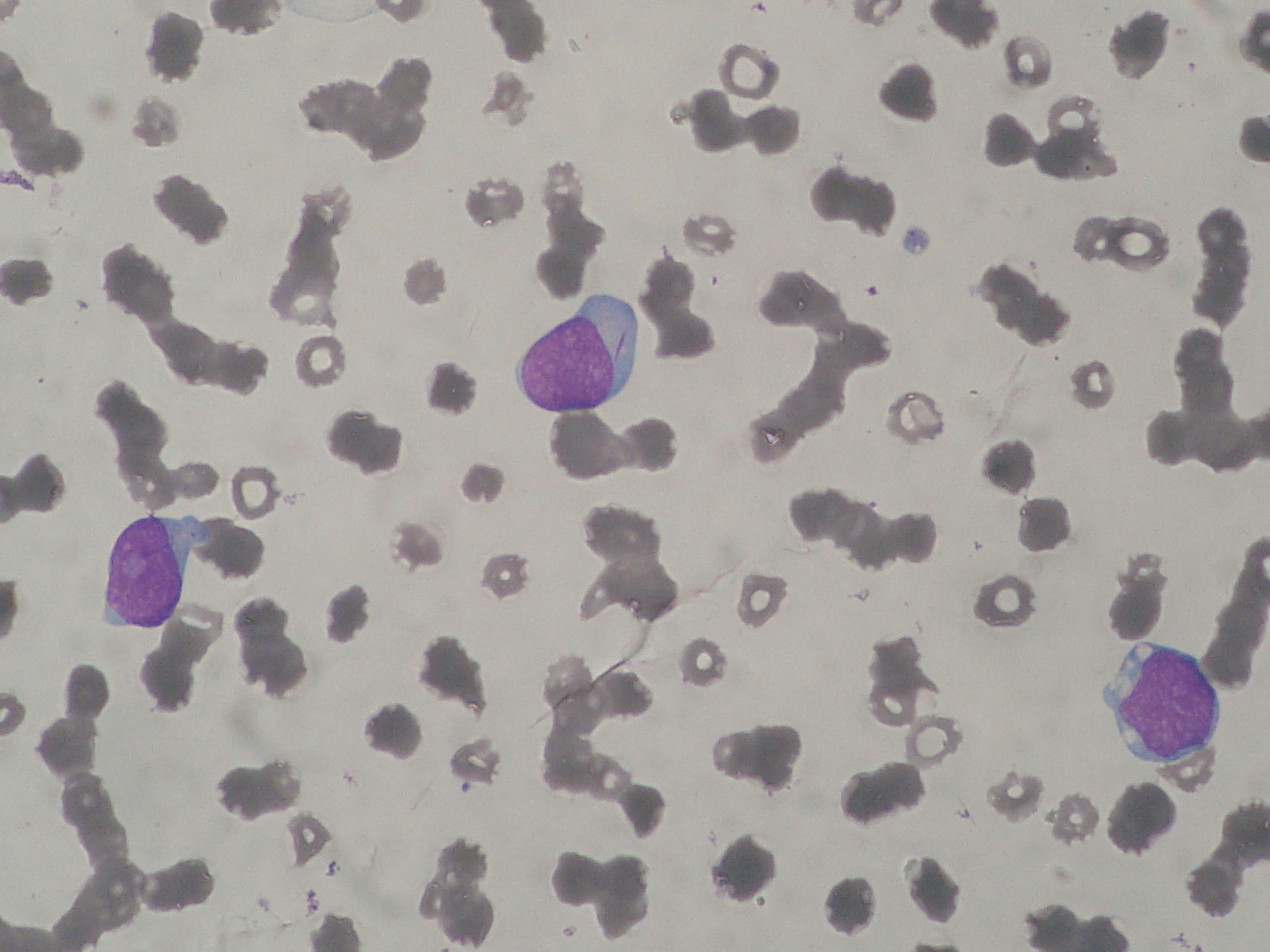

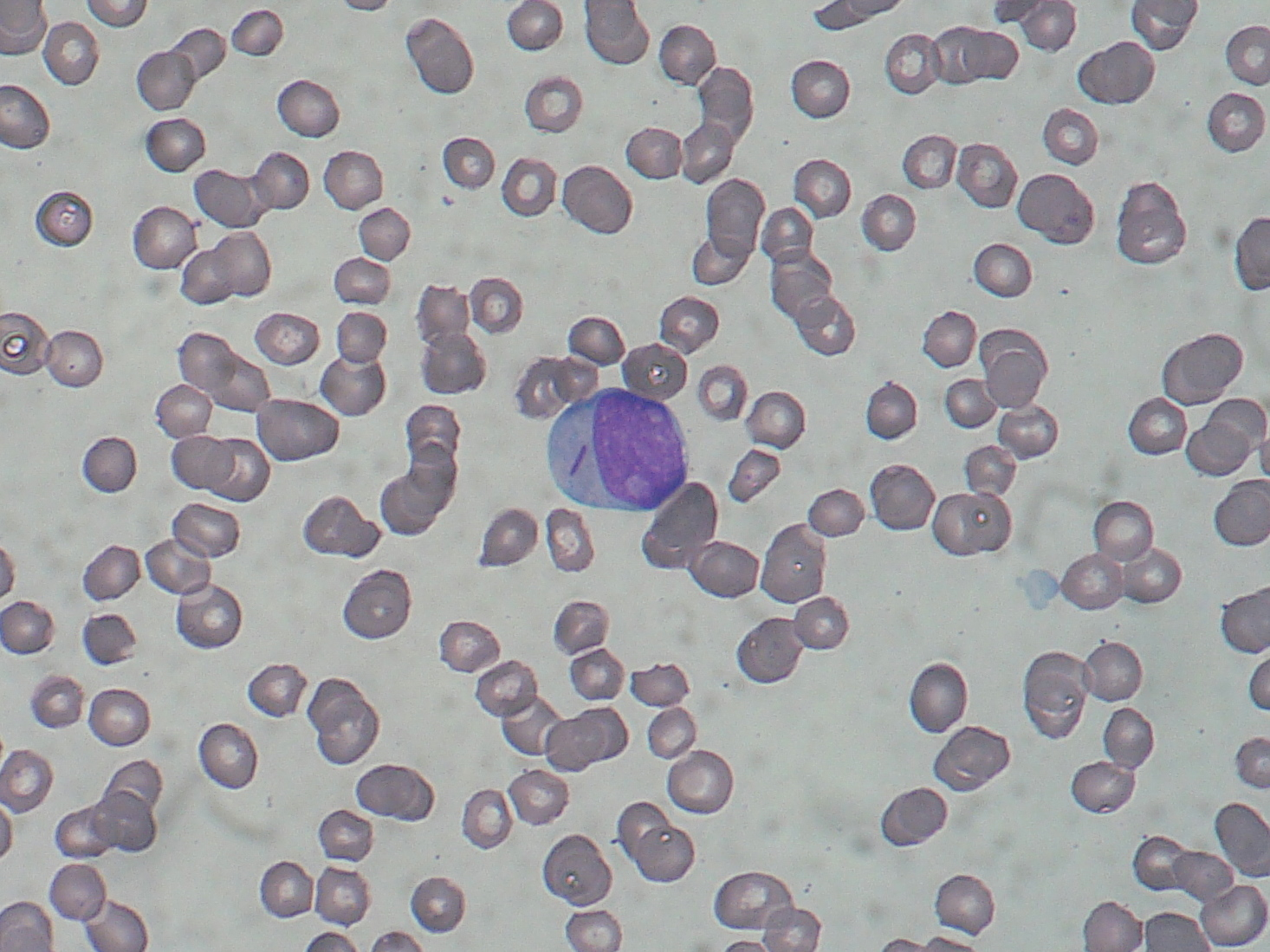
