= French–American–British classification =

Classification system of leukaemias and myelodysplasias

The French–American–British (FAB) classification systems refers to a series of classifications of hematologic diseases. It is based on the presence of dysmyelopoiesis and the quantification of myeloblasts and erythroblasts.

It was first produced in 1976.

Types include:

- FAB classification of acute lymphoblastic leukemias: L1–L3 (three subtypes)
- FAB classification of acute myeloid leukemias: M0–M7 (eight subtypes)
- FAB classification of myelodysplastic syndromes

Updates continued through at least 1989.
