= Chronic leukemia =

Chronic leukemia is an increase of abnormal white blood cells. It differs from acute leukemia, and is categorized as myelogenous, lymphocytic or myeloproliferative.

Chronic leukemia may refer to:

- Chronic myelogenous leukemia
- Chronic lymphocytic leukemia, including Hairy cell leukemia
- Myeloproliferative neoplasms including polycythemia vera, essential thrombocythemia, primary myelofibrosis, chronic neutrophilic leukemia , and chronic eosinophilic leukemia.
