= Induction chemotherapy =

Initial drug treatment designed to bring about remission

- Specialty: Oncology

Induction chemotherapy is the first-line treatment of cancer with a chemotherapeutic drug. The goal of induction chemotherapy is to cure the cancer. It may be contrasted with neoadjuvant therapy, with consolidation chemotherapy (intended to kill any cancer cells that survived the initial treatment), and with maintenance chemotherapy given at lower doses after the consolidation phase of treatment is over.

Induction chemotherapy has been shown to be beneficial in the control of malignant lymphomas and head and neck cancers when followed by radiotherapy or when treated concurrently with chemoradiotherapy.
