= Acute myeloblastic leukemia without maturation =

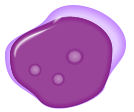
- Myeloblast
- Specialty: Hematology
- Frequency: 0.0001%

Acute myeloblastic leukemia without maturation is a quickly progressing disease in which too many immature white blood cells (not lymphocytes) are found in the blood and bone marrow.

It is classified as "M1" in the FAB classification.
