= Transient myeloproliferative disease =

- Other names: Transient abnormal myelopoiesis (TAM), transient leukemia, myeloid leukemia of Down syndrome

Transient myeloproliferative disease (TMD) occurs in a significant percentage of individuals born with the congenital genetic disorder, Down syndrome. It may occur in individuals who are not diagnosed with the syndrome but have some hematological cells containing genetic abnormalities that are similar to those found in Down syndrome. TMD usually develops in utero, is diagnosed prenatally or within ~3 months of birth, and thereafter resolves rapidly and spontaneously. However, during the prenatal-to-postnatal period, the disease may cause irreparable damage to various organs and in ~20% of individuals death. Moreover, ~10% of individuals diagnosed with TMD develop acute megakaryoblastic leukemia at some time during the 5 years following its resolution. TMD is a life-threatening, precancerous condition in fetuses as well as infants in their first few months of life.

Transient myeloproliferative disease involves the excessive proliferation of non-malignant megakaryoblasts. Megakaryoblasts are hematological precursor cells which mature to megakaryocytes. Megakaryocytes release platelets into the bloodstream. Platelets are critical for normal blood clotting. In consequence of this mutation, megakaryoblasts fail to mature properly, accumulate in multiple organs, may damage these organs, and may become cancerous. The diseases also causes a reduction in the maturation of erythroblasts to circulating red blood cells and, consequently, mild anemia.

Most individuals with TMD have clinical evidence of damage to various organs, particularly the liver, due to megakaryoblast infiltration, the accumulation of fluid in various tissue compartments, a bleeding tendency due to low levels of circulating platelets (i.e. thrombocytopenia), anemia due to reduced production of red blood cells, and/or other signs or symptoms of the disorder. However, some individuals with transient myeloproliferative disease have a presumably small clone of rapidly proliferating megakaryoblasts with inactivating GATA1 mutations but no other signs or symptoms of the disease. This form of TMD is termed silent transient abnormal myelopoiesis (i.e. silent TAM). Silent TAM is of clinical significance because it, like symptomatic TMD, may progress to an acute megakaryoblastic leukemia. This progression occurs in ~10% of TMD cases at some time during the 4-5 following birth and is due to the acquisition by the rapidly proliferating megakaryoblast clones of oncogenic mutations in other genes.

Chemotherapeutic regimens are used to treat individuals with TMD but only those who have life-threatening complications of the disease. It is not known if these regimens have an impact on the development of acute megakaryoblastic leukemia. Currently, it is recommended that individuals with TMD be followed medically for signs, symptoms, or laboratory evidence of its progression to this malignant disease with the notion that its early treatment may be of clinical benefit.

== Signs and symptoms ==
=== Before birth ===
Transient myeloproliferative disease develops and may be of concern in fetuses. Features in a review of 39 reported fetal cases include: reduced platelet production often accompanied by significantly reduced levels of circulating platelets; reduced red blood cell production sometimes accompanied by mild anemia; increased levels of circulating megakaryoblasts and white blood cells; grossly enlarged liver and liver dysfunction due to an excessive accumulation of platelet precursor cells; enlarged spleen presumed due mostly to the portal hypertension accompanying liver disease with extramedullary hematopoiesis possibly contributing to the enlargement; accumulation of excessive fluid in bodily compartments such as the pericardial, pleural, abdominal spaces; hydrops fetalis, i.e. the accumulation of excessive fluid in two or more bodily compartments; cardiomegaly and other cardiac abnormalities resulting form atrial septal defects, small ventricular septal defects, and/or, possibly, accumulation of megakaryocytes and secondary cardiac fibrosis. Hydrops fetalis, when accompanied by liver dysfunction, is a particularly poor prognostic combination in TMD.

=== After birth ===
==== Symptomatic disease ====
Clinical features in a review of 3 studies reporting on a total of 329 cases of symptomatic TMD include: premature birth (33-47%); enlarged liver (55-62%); evidence of liver dysfunction (13-63%); enlarged spleen (36-44%); heart disease (47-71%); gastrointestinal abnormalities (1-25%); and fluid accumulations in lung, heart, and/or abdomen (16-21%). In other studies; 5% of cases were associated with a vesiculopapular eruption; 3-6% of cases were associated with kidney failure or insufficiency presumed due mostly to complications of cardiac and/or liver dysfunction; rare cases of lung dysfunction due primarily to its compression by a massively enlarged liver and/or fluid accumulations in the pleural space; and rare cases of asymptomatic megakaryoblastic infiltration and secondary fibrosis in the pancreas. Other reports find decreased levels circulating platelets in 50% of cases, abnormal blood clotting in 10-25% of cases, anemia in 5-10%, and increased levels of circulating white blood cells in 50% of cases. The incidence of all these features except for low levels of blood platelets are appreciably higher in TMD than in Down syndrome individuals that lack inactivating GATA1 mutations. There are also uncommon instances of stillbirths and infant death within 24 hours of delivery.

==== Silent disease ====
Silent TAM lacks almost all of the clinical features of TMD, i.e. newborns with this disease exhibit no signs or symptoms that differ from those found in Down syndrome individuals who lack inactivating GATA1 mutations. Silent TAM nonetheless carries the threat of progressing to AMKL with an incidence similar to that occurring in TMD.

== Genetics ==
=== Down syndrome ===
Down syndrome is caused be the presence of an extra chromosome 21 (i.e. trisomy 21) due to a failure in normal chromosomal pairing or premature unpairing during the cell division of meiosis in egg or sperm cells. In these cases, virtually all cells in Down syndrome individuals bear an extra chromosome 21. However, there are other genetic changes that may either cause Down syndrome or cause an individual without Down syndrome to bear disease susceptibilities of the syndrome. These genetic changes include: a) genetic mosaicism in which some body cells bear a normal chromosome complement while others bear an extra chromosome 21; b) a part of chromosome 21 is located on another chromosome due to a Robertsonian translocation; c) partial trisomy 21 in which only part of chromosome 21 is duplicated; d) an isochromosome in which chromosome 21 contains two long but no short arms; and e) key genes on chromosome 21 are duplicated on this or other chromosomes. These genetic changes do occur in rare cases of individuals who do not have Down syndrome but nonetheless develop transient myeloproliferative disease due to the presence of extra copies of key genes normally found on chromosome 21 genes caused by mosaic, Robertsonian translocation, partial trisomy 21, isochromosome formation, or duplication.

Down syndrome by itself (i.e. in the absence of GATA1 gene mutations) is a cause for numerous hematological abnormalities which are similar to those seen in TMD. These Down syndrome-related abnormalities include increased numbers of stem cell precursors to platelets and red blood cells, impaired maturation of these precursors to platelets and red blood cells, thrombocytopenia, abnormal bleeding, anemia, leukocytosis, and serious liver damage. Since TMD is restricted to individuals with Down syndrome or otherwise have an excess of key chromosome 21 genes, it is suggested that certain chromosome 21 genes that are in triplicate and cause these hematological disorders in Down syndrome are essential for the development of GATA1 inactivating mutations and thereby TMD. These genes include ERG, a potentially cancer-causing oncogene that codes for a transcription factor; DYRK1A, which codes for a protein kinase type of enzyme involved in promoting cellular proliferation; and RUNX1, which codes for a transcription factor that regulates the maturation of hematological stem cells and, when mutated, is involved in the development of various myeloid neoplasms. It is hypothesized that trisomy 21 induces genome instability and stress, contributing to the development of somatic mutations associated with progression to leukemia.

=== Transient myeloproliferative disease ===
The human GATA1 gene is located on the short (i.e. "p") arm of the X chromosome at position 11.23. It is 7.74 kilobases in length, consists of 6 exons, and codes for a full length protein, GATA1, of 414 amino acids (atomic mass=50 kilodaltons) and a shorter protein, GATA1-S (also termed GATA1s). GATA1-S lacks the first 83 amino acids of GATA1 and consists of 331 amino acids (atomic mass = 40 kilodaltons). GATA1 and GATA1-S are transcription factors, i.e. nuclear proteins that regulate the expression of genes. The genes targeted by these two transcription factors help control the maturation of megakaryoblasts and promegakaryocytes to platelet-forming megakaryocytes and the maturation of erythroblasts to red blood cells. GATA1-S is less active than GATA1 in controlling most of these genes including those that stimulate megakaryoblast maturation but appears more effective than GATA1 in stimulating megakaryoblast proliferation. Outside of the Down syndrome (or a triplication in key chromosome 21 genes), GATA1 inactivating mutations cause or contribute to various non-malignant X-linked bleeding and anemic disorders that are due to failures in the maturation of precursor cells to platelets and red blood cells.

The GATA1 mutations in Down syndrome cause TMD. They occur in exon 2 or 3 of the gene and are truncating mutations that result in the gene's exclusive formation of GATA1-S, i.e. the gene makes no GATA1. Some 20% of individuals with Down syndrome bear one truncating mutation although some may bear up to 5 different truncating mutations and therefore have 5 different GATA1 mutant clones. These mutations occur in utero and can be detected in fetuses of 21 weeks gestational age. In the absence of GATA1, the GATA1-S transcription factor increases the proliferation but not maturation of megakaryoblasts and is insufficient to support the normal maturation of red blood cell precursors. Consequently, fetuses and, during their first few months of live, infants with these mutations exhibit extensive accumulations of immature megakaryoblasts in fetal blood-forming organs (particularly liver and bone marrow) and decreases in circulating platelet counts; they may also exhibit modest reductions in circulating red blood cells; and they may exhibit severe injuries in various organs. In ~80% of individuals, hematological changes resolve completely within ~3 months although organ injuries, particularly those to the liver, may take months or even years to fully resolve. During this resolution period, GATA1 mutations become undetectable. However, the original mutations are again detected in the acute megakaryoblastic leukemia cells indicating that the GATA1 mutations causing TMD decrease to undetectable levels as TMD resolves but, at least in cases that progress to AMKL, persist in a tiny clone of megakaryoblasts that evolve into the malignant cells of AMKL. In most cases, this evolution occurs over 1–5 years but in ~20% of cases the in utero or postnatal disease is severe, prolonged, and/or fatal or progresses to AMKL without exhibiting a resolution phase.

The GATA1 gene also regulates the maturation of eosinophils and dendritic cells. Its impact on the former cell type may underlie the increase in circulating blood eosinophils in TMD.

=== Acute megakaryoblastic leukemia ===
TMD may be followed within weeks to ~5 years by a subtype of myeloid leukemia, acute megakaryoblastic leukemia. AMKL is extremely rare in adults. The childhood disease is classified into two major subgroups based on its occurrence in individuals with or without Down syndrome. The disease in Down syndrome occurs in ~10% of individuals who previously had TMD. During the interval between TMD and the onset of AMKL, individuals accumulate multiple somatic mutations in cells that bear an inactivating GATA1 mutation plus trisomy 21 (or the presence of extra chromosome 21 genes involved in the development of TMD). These mutations are thought to result from the uncontrolled proliferation of blast cells caused by the GATAT1 mutation in the presence of trisomy 21 (or the presence of extra chromosome 21 genes involved in the development of TMD) and to be responsible for progression of the transient disorder to AMKL. The mutations occur in one or more genes including: TP53, FLT3, ERG, DYRK1A, CHAF1B, HLCS, RUNX1, MIR125B2 (which is the gene for microRNA MiR125B2CTCF, STAG2, RAD21, SMC3, SMC1A, NIPBL, SUZ12, PRC2, JAK1, JAK2, JAK3, MPL, KRAS, NRAS, and SH2B3.

== Pathophysiology ==
The development and progression of TMD result from collaborations between various genes: 1) during fetal development, an immature megakaryoblast which has extra copies of key genes located on chromosome 21 (e.g. ERG, DYKR1A, and/or RUNX1) acquires an inactivating mutation in GATA1 that causes it to make only GATA1-S; 2) this cell(s) grows into a genetically identical group, i.e. a clone, of non-malignant megakaryoblasts which proliferate excessively, fail to mature normally, and over-populate fetal blood-forming organisms, particularly the liver and bone marrow, thereby establishing TMD; 3) most cells in this clone are still genetically programmed to die during the ensuing fetal and early postnatal period thereby resolving TMD; 4) some cells in this GATA1-mutant clone escape the death program although their numbers are too low for detection by current methods; 5) in ~10% of TMD cases, the surviving cells from the GATA1 mutant clone undergo an evolution to cancer, i.e. they acquire mutations in other genes (see preceding section) which causes at least one of them to be malignant, immortal, and rapidly proliferating thereby founding a clone of megakaryoblasts that have the original GATA1 mutation, extra chromosome 21 genes, and one or more one of the newly acquired oncogenic gene mutations; and 6) the cells in this malignant clone infiltrate, accumulate in, and injure various organs and tissues thereby establishing AMKL. These stages in the development and progression of TMD may involve up to 5 different GATA1 gene mutations in different megakaryoblasts and therefore result in the evolution of up to 5 different GATA1-mutant clones, at least one of which may found the malignant clone involved in AMKL.

The severity of transient myeloproliferative disease appears to depend on the size of the GATA1 mutant clone. It is likely, for example, that the lack of clinical features in silent TAM is a reflection of the small size of its mutant GATA1 clone.

The liver of TMD-individuals accumulate abnormally high numbers of platelet and -to a lesser extent- red blood cell precursors. The liver, it is suggested, may be the primary site for excessive proliferation of the GATA1 mutant clone(s) of platelet precursor cells, primarily megakaryobllasts and the accumulation of these precursor cells along to red blood cell precursor cells appears to be an important cause of the liver enlargement and dysfunction occurring in TMD.

TMD is associated with fibrosis (i.e. replacement of normal tissue with fibrous tissue) in the liver. This fibrosis may be severe and even life-threatening. Based primarily on mouse and isolated human cell studies, this myelofibrosis is thought to result from the excessive accumulation of mutant GATA1-bearing platelet precursor cells in these organs: the precursor cells make and release abnormally large amounts of cytokines (platelet-derived growth factor; transforming growth factor beta 1) which stimulate tissue stromal cells to become fiber-secreting fibroblasts.

ML-DS (Myeloid leukemia in Down syndrome) features mutations in the cohesin complex, including RAD21, STAG1, SMC3, SMC1A, and the associated factor NIPBL in over half of cases, whereas these mutations are rare in TAM (transient abnormal myelopoiesis). Notably, cohesin mutations alter chromatin accessibility at ERG, RUNX1, and GATA transcription factor motifs.

== Diagnosis ==
Fetuses and newborns with Down syndrome without GATA1 inactivating mutations have numerous hematological abnormalities some of which are similar to those in TMD including increased numbers of circulating blasts, decreased numbers of circulating platelets and red blood cells, and increased numbers of circulating white blood cells. Also like TMD, these Down syndrome (no GATA1 mutation) individuals exhibit hepatomegaly, abnormal liver function tests, and jaundice. However, these abnormalities are usually more frequent and/or severe in TMD. Furthermore, enlarged spleen, fluid accumulations in body cavities, and leukemia cutis (i.e. a rash due to the infiltration of platelet precursor cells into the skin) occur in ~30, 9, and 5%, respectively, of TMD cases but are rarely observed in individuals with Down syndrome (no GATA1 mutation). The blood of individuals with TMD may contain grossly malformed blast cells, giant platelets, and fragments of megakaryocytes which are rarely seen in individuals with Down syndrome (no GATA1 mutation). Bone marrow examination reveals increases in blast cells in essentially all cases of TMED, increased fibrosis in a small but significant percentage of cases, defective maturation of platelet precursors in ~75% of cases, and defective maturation of red blood cell precursors in 25% of cases. These abnormalities are generally more extreme that those seen in Down syndrome (no GATA1 mutation). The overall constellation of abnormalities found in TMD often suggest its diagnosis.

In all individuals suspected of having the symptomatic or silent disease, the diagnosis of TMD requires demonstrating the presence, in the platelet precursor cells of blood, bone marrow, or liver, of GATA1 mutations that are projected to cause the gene to make GATA1-S but not GATA1 transcription factors. Since these mutations are limited to a clone(s) of platelet precursor cells which may represent only a small fraction of all platelet precursor cells, high-throughput DNA sequencing methods are required to detect many cases of the disease, particularly in silent TAM cases which may have only a small number of platelet precursors with the mutation. The in utero diagnosis of fetal TMD depends on medical ultrasound scanning to detect fluid accumulations in body cavities, cardiac abnormalities (particularly atrial septal defects), organ enlargements (particularly of the liver, spleen, or heart), fetal size, and fetal movements. Blood samples are obtained from the fetal umbilical cord to determine blood cell counts, measure blood enzymes to evaluate liver function, and the presence in circulating platelet precursor cells of GATA1 mutations that are associated with TMD.

== Treatment ==
Since 80 to 90% of newborns with transient myeloproliferative disease recover within ~3 months (organ enlargement make take longer to resolve), treatment is generally restricted to cases with life-threatening complications. These complications include severe: a) hydrops fetalis; b) increases in circulating white blood cells (e.g. >10-fold elevations) that can lead to a blood disorder termed the hyperviscosity syndrome; c) bleeding due to disseminated intravascular coagulation or, less commonly, reduced levels of circulating platelet; d) liver dysfunction; or e) cardiac dysfunction. There have been no large controlled studies published on treatment but several small studies report that low dose cytarabine, a chemotherapeutic drug, has beneficial effects in these cases. High dose cytarabine, however, has been found to be highly toxic in infants with TMD; it is recommended that these dosages be avoided in TMD. The goal of low dose cytarabine in TMD is to reduce the load but not eradicate platelet precursors in tissues and/or circulating megakaryoblasts or, in cases of extreme leukocytosis, white blood cells, particularly since none of these cells are malignant. There is insufficient data to indicate the value of therapy in prenatal cases. Supportive fetal therapy consisting of repeated in utero transfusion of packed red blood cells and platelet concentrates has been reported to reduce the proportion of circulating blast cell, reduce fluid accumulations in fetal cavities, and reduce the size of an enlarged liver; preterm induction of delivery has also been used in infants with fetal distress. However, further studies are required to determine the clinical usefulness of these and other interventions in prenatal TMD. The Cochrane Organization rated the quality of evidence for these fetal interventions as very low.

Experts suggest that individuals with symptomatic or silent TMD be followed medically for signs and/or symptoms of the disease's progression to AMKL. This includes physical examinations to measure liver and spleen size as well as complete blood counts to measure the levels of circulating platelets, erythrocytes, white blood cells, and platelet precursor cells. Recommendations for the frequency of these measurements vary from every 3 to 12 months. A complex drug regimen that includes high dose cytarabine has shown good results in treating AMKL.

== Prognosis ==
Overall mortality during the first year as reported in three studies (all of which included individuals treated for their TMD), range between 15 and 21% in TMD and between 4 and 12% in Down syndrome (no GATA1 mutation). Virtually all of the deaths occurring in TMD happened within the first 6 months. Risk factors that increased mortality in TMD were prematurity, extremely elevated circulating blast and/or white blood cells, hepatic dysfunction, ascites (i.e. fluid in the abdominal cavity), excessive bleeding and/or blood clotting, and kidney dysfunction. About 10% of all TMD cases, including those with silent disease, will progress to AMKL at some time during the first 5 years after birth. AMKL associated with Down syndrome is far less severe a disease that AMKL not associated with the syndrome. Event free survival and overall survival (studies include chemotherapy-treated cases) during the 5 years following its diagnosis in children with Down syndrome with AMKL is ~80%; it is 43% and 49%, respectively, in children with AMKL who do not have Down syndrome. Median survival in adult AMKL is only 10.4 months.

== History ==
TMD was first described and termed congenial leukemia by Bernard and colleagues in a 1951 publication. It was defined to be limited to individuals with Down Syndrome and to be spontaneously regressing in 1954, and thereafter reported to progress to a leukemia in two reports, the first published in 1957 and the second published in 1964. Respective reports by D. Lewis in 1981 and Bennett et al in 1985 indicated that the blast cells involved in TMD and its leukemic sequel were platelet precursor cells. Studies by J.D. Crispino and colleagues in 2002 and 2003 showed that GATA1 mutations were respectively involved in TMD and AMKL.

== See also ==
- Acute myeloid leukemia
