= Acute megakaryoblastic leukemia =

Blood marrow cancer originating in megakaryoblast cells

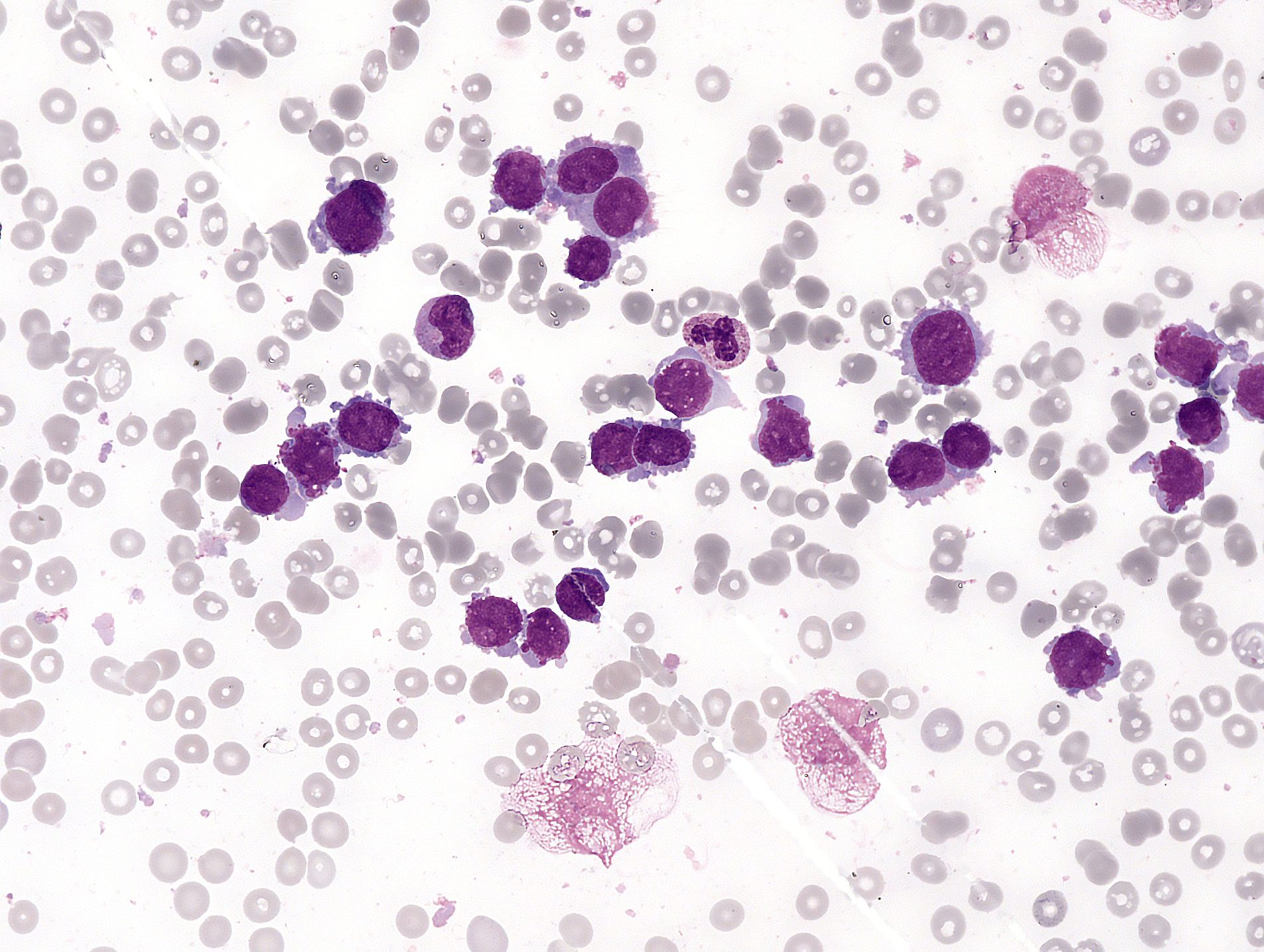
- AML-M7, Blast cells of acute megakaryoblastic leukemia in the bone marrow. Clasmatosis of the cytoplasm of atypical cells is observed. Some of the cells produce and release platelets
- Specialty: Hematology, oncology
- Frequency: 0.0001%

Acute megakaryoblastic leukemia (AMKL) is life-threatening leukemia in which malignant megakaryoblasts proliferate abnormally and injure various tissues. Megakaryoblasts are the most immature precursor cells in a platelet-forming lineage; they mature to promegakaryocytes and, ultimately, megakaryocytes which cells shed membrane-enclosed particles, i.e. platelets, into the circulation. Platelets are critical for the normal clotting of blood. While malignant megakaryoblasts usually are the predominant proliferating and tissue-damaging cells, their similarly malignant descendants, promegakaryocytes and megakaryocytes, are variable contributors to the malignancy.

AMKL is commonly regarded as a subtype of acute myeloid leukemia (AML). More formally, it is classified under the AML-M7 category of the French-American-British classification and by the World Health Organization of 2016 in the AML-Not Otherwise Specified subcategory.

Acute megakaryoblastic leukemia falls into three distinct groups which differ in underlying causes, ages of presentation, responses to therapy, and prognoses. These groups are: AMKL occurring in young children with Down syndrome, i.e. DS-AMKL; AMKL occurring in children who do not have Down syndrome, i.e. non-DS-AMKL (also termed pediatric acute megakaryoblastic leukemia or pediatric AMKL); and AMKL occurring in non-DS adults, i.e. adult-AMKL. AMKL, while rare, is the most common form of AML in DS-AMKL, occurring ~500-fold more commonly in children with Down syndrome than in children without Down syndrome; non-DS-AMKL and adult-AMKL are rare, accounting for <1% of all individuals diagnosed as in the AML-M7 category of leukemia.

== DS-AMKL ==
=== Pathophysiology ===
Individuals with Down syndrome almost always have three instead of the normal two copies of chromosome 21. The extra copies of key chromosome 21 genes underlie their increased susceptibility to AMKL by promoting the development of a certain type of inactivating mutation in the GATA1 gene. The GATA1 gene resides on the X chromosome and codes for two transcription factors, GATA1 and a shorter version, GATA1-S. GATA1 and GATA1-S contribute to regulating the expression of genes that control the maturation of megakaryoblasts to promegakaryocytes, megakaryocytes, and platelets as well as the maturation of erythroblasts to red blood cells. GATA1-S appears less active than GATA1 in controlling some of the genes that promote megakaryoblast maturation but more active than GATA1 in stimulating megakaryoblast proliferation. Various GATA1 mutations that cause this gene to make GATA1-S but unable to make GATA1 result in the excessive proliferation of platelet precursor cells, reductions in the levels of circulating blood platelets, mild reductions in the levels of circulating red blood cells, and the development of transient myeloproliferative disease (TMD). TMD is a disorder involving the excessive proliferation of non-malignant megakaryoblasts and descendent cells due to the cited truncating mutations in the GATA1 gene. TMD is a necessary predecessor to DS-AMKL.

Down syndrome fetuses and neonates with one of the cited types of GATA1 truncating mutations are in rare cases asymptomatic (i.e. silent TMD) but more commonly exhibit in utero or during the first months of live accumulations of immature megakaryoblasts in, and sometimes life-threatening injury to, the fetal blood-forming organ, the liver, and other tissues. While fatal in up to 20% of cases, ~80 of infants with TMD fully recover from the diseases within 4 months. However, ~10% of individuals with a history of symptomatic or silent TMD develop DS-AMKL within 4 years. During this interval, these individuals may acquire somatic mutations in those of their megakaryoblasts that bear the original truncating GATA1 mutation. These newly acquired mutations appear to result from the interactions of GATAT1 truncating mutations with excessive copies of chromosome 21 genes. The genes with these mutations include TP53, FLT3, ERG, DYRK1A, CHAF1B, HLCS, RUNX1, MIR125B2 (which is the gene for microRNA MiR125B2CTCF, STAG2, RAD21, SMC3, SMC1A, NIPBL, SUZ12, PRC2, JAK1, JAK2, JAK3, MPL, KRAS, NRAS, and SH2B3. At least one but probably several of these mutations, whether occurring in individuals with silent or symptomatic TMD, are presumed responsible for or to contribute to the development of DS-AMKL.

Rare cases of transient myeloproliferative disease and DS-AMKL occur in individuals who do not have Down syndrome. These individuals usually have a history of TMD and invariably have megakaryoblasts which bear extra copies of key chromosome 21 genes, truncating mutations in GATA1, and somatic mutations in one or more of the genes listed in the previous section. These individuals have extra copies of only a portion of the genes on chromosome 21. This duplication of only some chromosome 21 genes results from: a) Robertsonian translocations, wherein part of chromosome 21 is duplicated on another chromosome; b) partial trisomy 21, wherein only part of chromosome 21 is duplicated); c) an isochromosome, wherein chromosome 21 contains two long but no short arms); or d) duplications, wherein extra chromosome 21 genes are on this or other chromosomes. AMKL occurring in these individuals is classified as DS-AMKL.

=== Presentation ===
DS-AMKL most often presents in children 1–2 years old but almost always less than 4 years old who have a history of TMD. Given this history, these children are usually followed-up medically with complete blood count tests. and therefore often present with elevated blood levels of abnormally appearing platelets and platelet precursor cells, particularly megakaryoblasts, and reduced blood levels of red blood cells. DS-AMKL usually progresses slowly with affected children gradually developing increasingly more severe changes in their blood counts as well as slowly developing symptoms of these developments such as fatigue and shortness of breath due to anemia. In cases of advanced disease, individuals with DS-AMKL may present with signs and symptoms that are more typical of acute myeloid leukemic diseases such as liver enlargement, spleen enlargement, leukemia cutis (i.e. skin nodules caused by leukemic infiltrates), or leukostasis (i.e. an emergency situation in which excessive elevations in circulating blast (i.e. early precursor) cells plug the microcirculation to cause life-threatening heart, lung, and neurological dysfunctions).

=== Diagnosis ===
The diagnosis of DS-AMKL in young children is indicated by: a history of TMD; findings of increased presence of blast cells (e.g. ≥20% of nucleated cells) that have the megakaryoblast phenotype in blood and/or bone marrow as defined by the morphology of these cells in blood or bone marrow smears; failure to obtain a bone marrow aspirate because of marrow fibrosis; and immunophenotyping analyses of platelet precursor cells lineage as determined by flow cytometry and immunohistochemistry. Malignant megakaryoblasts are usually medium-sized to large cells with a high nuclear-cytoplasmic ratio. Nuclear chromatin is dense and homogeneous. There is scanty, variable basophilic cytoplasm which may be excessively vacuolated. An irregular cytoplasmic border is often noted in some of the megakaryoblasts and occasionally projections resembling budding atypical platelets are present. Megakaryoblasts lack myeloperoxidase (MPO) activity and stain negatively with Sudan Black B. They are alpha naphthyl butyrate esterase negative and manifest variable alpha naphthyl acetate esterase activity usually in scattered clumps or granules in the cytoplasm. PAS diastase staining varies from negative to focal or granular positivity to strongly positive. Immunochemical analyses, often conducted by flow cytometry, of the surface antigens on leukemic blast cells are positive for CD41, CD42b, CD51, and Von Willebrand factor in AMKL but not leukemia involving non-platelet malignant cells.

Where indicated and available, the diagnosis of DS-AMKL is further supported by; immunophenotyping analysis using monoclonal antibody directed against megakaryocyte restricted antigen (CD41 and CD61) and DNA sequencing to detect GATA1 mutations that are projected to cause the gene to make GATA1-S but not GATA1 transcription factors.

=== Treatment ===
The chemotherapy regimens used for all types of AMKL are similar to those used for AML. A final confirmation of safety and efficacy phase 3 study consisted of 4 cycles of induction therapy with cytarabine and daunorubicin followed by a single course of intensification therapy consisting of cytarabine and L-asparaginase, and concluded with a central nervous system consolidation course of 3 additional doses of intrathecal cytarabine. The dosages of cytarabine in this study were kept low because DS-AMKL patients proved highly susceptible to the toxic effects of the regimen which used a higher cytarabine dosage to treat AML. The low-dose cytarabine regimen achieved excellent results in DS-AMKL with relatively reduced overall toxicity and is currently recommended as a preferred treatment regimen for the disease.

Autologous hematopoietic stem cell transplantation (i.e. transplantation of stem cells derived from the individual being transplanted) did not improve relapse-free survival in one large study of DS-AMKL. Allogenic hematopoietic stem cell transplantation (i.e. transplantation of stem cells derived another individual) has given better disease-free survival results than autologous transplantation and, based on recent uncontrolled studies, should be considered in DS-AMKL cases that have relapsed after their first chemotherapy-induced complete remission.

=== Prognosis ===
The 5-year event free survival, disease-free survival, and overall survival rate in the phase 3 clinical study in DS-AMKL were 79, 89, 84 percent, respectively. Other studies that use a treatment regimen similar to that used in the phase 3 clinical study report overall survival rates of ~80% and long-term survivals of 74-91%. However, DS-AMKL patients who relapse following chemotherapy have a far poorer outlook with 3 year overall survival rate in one study of only 26%. There also appears to be little role for stem cell transplantation in DS-AMKL given the success of initial chemotherapy and the relatively poor results in DS-AMKL patients given this transplantation.

== Non-DS-AMKL ==
=== Pathophysiology ===
The most common genetic abnormality occurring in non-Down-AMKL is a nonreciprocal translocation between the short or p arm at position 13 on chromosome 1 (i.e. 1p13) and the p arm at position 13 on chromosome 22 (i.e. 22p13). Nonreciprocal translocations are exchanges of genes between two chromosomes that are not homologs, i.e. that are not maternal and paternal copies of the same chromosome. This particular translocation, designated t(1;22)(p13;q13), occurs mainly in infants but also is seen in children up to the age of 7 years with non-DS-AMKL. This translocation involves the RBM15 gene on chromosome 1 and the MKL1 gene (also termed MRTFA) on chromosome 22 to create a RBM15-MKL1 fusion gene. Studies in mice indicate that the Mkl1 gene (only the first letter of a mouse gene is capitalized) product, MKL1, interacts with the transcription factor SRF to stimulate the expression of various genes. MKLl is required for the maturation of mouse megakaryoblasts: in its absence, megakaryoblasts and promegakaryocytes proliferate abnormally while megakaryocytes are few in number and have an abnormal morphology. Mouse studies also indicate that the product of Rbm15, RMB15, interacts with Nuclear receptor co-repressor 1, Nuclear receptor co-repressor 2 (also termed SMRT), and RBPJ nuclear proteins to suppress the expression of various genes that are involved in the maturation of platelet, myeloid and lymphocyte precursor cells. In consequence, the RBM15-MKL1 fusion protein acts in an unregulated fashion to suppress MKL1 targeted genes while stimulating RPBJ target genes. This causes an over-active Notch signaling pathway and, among other abnormalities, expansion of fetal hematopoiesis and development of AMKL in a small percentage of adult mice. It is assumed that these events must be accompanied by other, as yet undefined, oncogenic (i.e., cancer causing) events to explain the development of human non-Down AMKL. A large number of other genetic abnormalities are associated with the development of non-DS-AMLK. These include complex chromosomal rearrangements and increases in copy number of various genes. Besides the t(1;22)(p13;q13) translocation, common genetic abnormalities in a study of 372 individuals diagnosed with non-DS-AMKL include: rearrangements of genes at position 23 on the long (i.e. q) arm of chromosome 11; inversion of chromosome 16 occurring between p13.3 and q24.3 denoted as inv(16)(p13.3q24.3) that results in the production of a CBFA2T3-GLIS2 fusion protein; and increases in chromosome numbers from a normal of 46 to anywhere from 47 to >50. The relationships of these and the many other genetic abnormalities detected in non-Down-AMKL to the disease's development require further investigations.

=== Presentation ===
Non-DS-AMKL occurs in neonates, infants, and children of all ages. Except for the lack of Down syndrome, no history of TMD, and occurrences in children that can be >4 years of age, individuals with non-DS-AMKL present with many of the symptoms, signs, and hematological findings seen in DS-AMKL. However, non-DS-AMKL is a more aggressive and rapidly progressing disorder than DS-AMKL. Nonetheless, the presentation of non-DS-AMKL is also like DS-AMKL in that it is not often accompanied by one or more extramedullary signs or symptoms of the disease such as liver enlargement, spleen enlargement, leukemia cutis, and leukostasis.

=== Diagnosis ===
The diagnosis of non-DS-AMKL is made in children who do not have Down syndrome but exhibit the same clinical symptoms, signs, hematological abnormalities, and specialized laboratory findings seen in DS-AMKL. These children should bear one or more of the genetic aberrations associated with the disease but not the inactivating GATA1 mutations, extra copies of chromosome 21 genes, or other genetic abnormalities associated with DS-AMKL. Non-DS-AMKL has many clinical and laboratory features similar to and must be distinguished from Acute panmyelosis with myelofibrosis, a disorder characterized by bone marrow fibrosis, abnormal megakaryocytes, macrocytic erythropoiesis, defects in neutrophil production, reduced blood levels of most circulating cells (i.e. pancytopenia), and low levels of circulating blast cells. Analyses of circulating and bone marrow blast cells for features of AMKL (see Diagnosis section of DS-AMKL) and genetic aberrations is helpful in distinguishing the two diseases.

=== Treatment ===
In a review of 153 patients treated for non-DS-AMKL between 1990 and 2014 with various intensive chemotherapy protocols that included cytarabine, an anthracycline (e.g. daunorubicin, doxorubicin), and in 25% of cases human stem cell transplantation, the probability of overall 4 year survival rate, probability of 4 year event-free survival, and probability of 4 year cumulative relapse rate were 56, 51, and 29%, respectively. A more recent treatment regimen that is similar to that used to treat DS-AMKL as described above (except it employs the high dose of cytarabine used to treat AML) gives better results and has been recommended for non-DS-AMKL. The response to this regimen approached that seen in non-DS-AMKL, i.e. its complete remission and estimated 10 year survival rates were both 76%. Similar to DS-AMKL treatment regimens, allogenic rather than autologous stem cell bone marrow transplantation should be considered in non-DS-AMKL cases that have relapsed following their first chemotherapy-induced complete remission. Further studies may indicate that this recent cancer chemotherapy regimen plus allogenic bone marrow transplantation in cases which relapse after the first remission are the preferred treatment for non-DS-AMKL.

=== Prognosis ===
In a review of 153 patients treated for non-DS-AMKL between 1990 and 2014 with various intensive chemotherapy protocols that included cytarabine, an anthracycline (e.g. daunorubicin, doxorubicin), and in 25% of cases human stem cell transplantation, the probability of overall 4 year survival rate, probability of 4 year event-free survival, and probability of 4 year cumulative relapse rate were 56, 51, and 29%, respectively. Patients with non-DS-AMKL given the treatment regimen described for DS-AMKL above had a much better prognosis than patients treated with earlier-devised treatment regimens: their overall survival rate using these regimen was estimated to be 76%.

== Adult-AMKL ==
=== Pathophysiology ===
Adult-AMKL can result from the progression of other myeloproliferative neoplasms (MPN) viz., chronic myelogenous leukemia, polycythemia vera, essential thrombocytosis, and primary myelofibrosis. In one review of adult-AMKL, 25% of 49 cases were considered as secondary to a MPN. The mechanism behind cases of secondary AMKL are unknown, although an inversion in chromosome 3 at positions q21 and q26(i.e. inv(3)(q21q26)) is often seen in secondary cases of adult-AMKL.

Rare cases of adult-AMKL also occur with mediastinal germ cell tumors. These tumors are malignancies of germ cells, i.e. primitive cells that give rise to sperm and ovum cells. In adult-AMKL, mediastinal germ cell tumors that are associated with adult-AMKL are not seminomas (i.e. do not originate from the sperm cell line) and occur before or concomitantly with but not after the diagnosis AMKL is made. The three most common genetic aberrations in the bone marrow cells of these individuals (representing ~65% of all cases) were inversions in the p arm of chromosome 12, trisomy 8, and an extra X chromosome. In several of these cases, genetic aberrations in the malignant platelet precursor cells were similar to those in the malignant mediastinal germ cells. These results and those of other analyses suggest that the two malignancies derive from a common founding clone of cells (i.e. a set of genetically identical cells).

Overall, the most common genetic aberrations occurring in adult-AMKL are the previously described inv(3)(q21q26) inversion, translocation between the q arm of chromosome 9 at position 34 and the q arm of chromosome 22 at position 11, i.e. t(9:22)(q34:q11) and various aberrations in chromosome 5 or chromosome 7. Aberrations in the latter two chromosomes are also commonly seen in an AML that is associated with myelodydplastic-related changes (i.e. predominance of immature blood cells in the bone marrow). The underlying malignancy-causing mechanism behind these genetic aberrations requires further study.

=== Presentation ===
Adult-AMKL may occur in individuals who have a prior diagnosis of and/or present with chronic myelogenous leukemia, polycythemia vera, essential thrombocytosis, primary myelofibrosis, or mediastinal germ cell tumor. AMKL associated with mediastinal germ cell tumors typically occurs in younger adults, i.e. ages 13–36 (average age 24). Cases occurring in children aged ≤18 years, which represent ~20% of all cases, could be regarded in the non-DS-AMKL category. Cases of the disease not associated with mediastinal germ cell tumors occur in adults who as a group have older median age centering around those 50–70 years old. The disorder is far more fulminant than non-DS-AMKL and DS-AMKL and generally presents with more serious hematological symptoms (e.g. anemia-related) and a much higher incidence of extramedullary manifestations (e.g. organ enlargement, leukemia cutis) than seen in the other two forms of AMKL.

=== Diagnosis ===
Adult-AMKL commonly occurs in adults in their sixties and seventies but may be seen in adolescents as young as 13. Its diagnosis can be suspected in cases that have either a prior history of MPN or a history or current findings indicating the presence of mediastinal blast cell tumor. In all cases, the diagnosis adult-AMKL rests upon the same determinations used to diagnose DS-AMKL, e.g. increased blast cells in blood and/or bone marrow, immunochemical evidence that these blast cells bear platelet line-specific markers, and occurrence of the genetic aberrations in these blast cells that have been associated with the disease.

=== Treatment ===
Adult-AMKL has remained poorly responsive to the treatment regimens used in DS-AMKL and non-DS-AMKL. These treatments have given complete remission rates of 43-50%.

=== Prognosis ===
The prognosis of adult-AMKL in patients treated for the disease is far below that of other forms of AMKL. Their median overall survival times are only 18 to 41 weeks with 5 year survival rates of only 10-11 percent. Major improvements in these statistics will likely require new approaches directed at the underlying mechanisms driving the disease.

== See also ==
- List of hematologic conditions
