= Leukemia =

Type of cancer

- Other names: Leukaemia
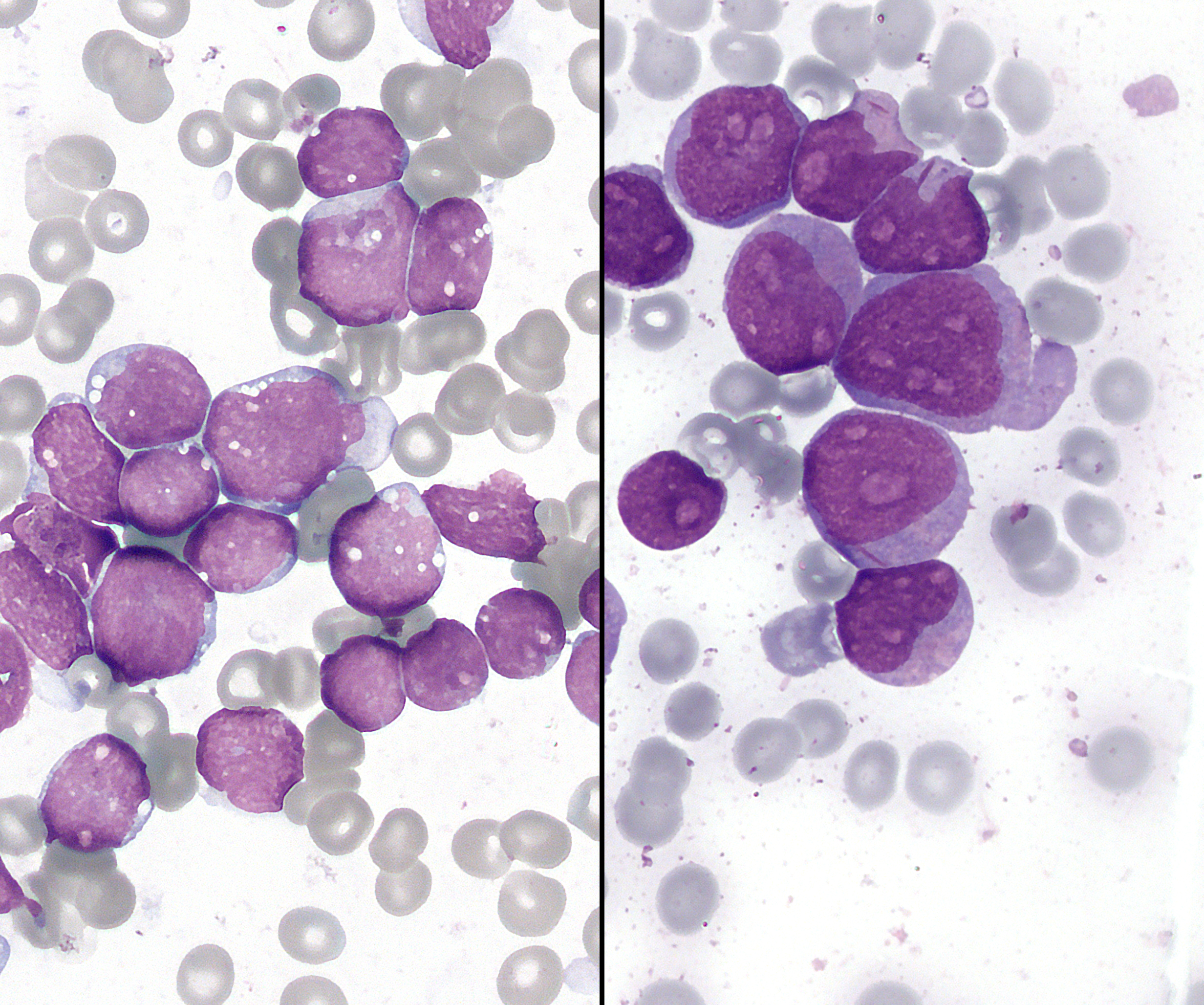
- A Wright's stained bone marrow aspirate smears from individuals with B-cell acute lymphoblastic leukemia (left) and acute myeloid leukemia (right). Myeloid leukemia cells are usually larger, contain prominent nucleoli, and specific, but not mandatory, cytoplasmic inclusions – Auer rods (purple needles).
- Pronunciation: /luːˈkiːmiːə/
- Specialty: Hematology and oncology
- Symptoms: Bleeding, bruising, fatigue, fever, increased risk of infections
- Usual onset: All ages, most common in 60s and 70s. It is the most common malignant cancer in children, but the cure rates are also higher for them.
- Causes: Inherited and environmental factors
- Risk factors: Smoking, family history, ionizing radiation, some chemicals such as trichloroethylene, prior chemotherapy, Down syndrome.
- Diagnostic method: Blood tests, bone marrow biopsy
- Treatment: Chemotherapy, radiation therapy, targeted therapy, bone marrow transplant, supportive care
- Prognosis: Five-year survival rate 69% (U.S.)
- Frequency: 2.3 million (2015)
- Deaths: 353,500 (2015)

Leukemia (also spelled leukaemia; pronounced /luːˈkiːmiːə/ loo-KEE-mee-ə) is a group of blood cancers that usually begin in the bone marrow and produce high numbers of abnormal blood cells. These blood cells are not fully developed and are called blasts or leukemia cells. Signs and symptoms may include bleeding and bruising, bone pain, fatigue, fever, and an increased risk of infections. These symptoms occur due to a lack of normal blood cells. Diagnosis is typically made by blood tests or bone marrow biopsy.

The exact cause of leukemia is still under research. A combination of genetic factors and environmental (non-inherited) factors are believed to play a role. Risk factors include smoking, ionizing radiation, petrochemicals (such as benzene), prior chemotherapy, and Down syndrome. People with a family history of leukemia are also at higher risk. There are four main types of leukemia—acute lymphoblastic leukemia (ALL), acute myeloid leukemia (AML), chronic lymphocytic leukemia (CLL) and chronic myeloid leukemia (CML)—and a number of less common types. Leukemias and lymphomas both belong to a broader group of tumors that affect the blood, bone marrow, and lymphoid system, known as tumors of the hematopoietic and lymphoid tissues.

Treatment may involve some combination of chemotherapy, radiation therapy, targeted therapy, and bone marrow transplant, with supportive and palliative care provided as needed. Certain types of leukemia may be managed with watchful waiting. The success of treatment depends on the type of leukemia and the age of the person. Outcomes have improved in the developed world. Five-year survival rate was 69% in the United States in the period from 2016 to 2022. In children under 15 in first-world countries, the five-year survival rate is greater than 60% or even 90%, depending on the type of leukemia. For infants (those diagnosed under the age of 1), the survival rate is around 40%. In children who are cancer-free five years after diagnosis of acute leukemia, the cancer is unlikely to return.

In 2015, leukemia was present in 2.3 million people worldwide and caused 353,500 deaths. In 2012, it had newly developed in 352,000 people. It is the most common type of cancer in children, with three-quarters of leukemia cases in children being the acute lymphoblastic type. However, over 90% of all leukemias are diagnosed in adults, CLL and AML being the most common. It occurs more commonly in the developed world.

== Classification ==
Four major kinds of leukemia
Cell type	Acute	Chronic
Lymphocytic leukemia (or "lymphoblastic")	Acute lymphoblastic leukemia (ALL)	Chronic lymphocytic leukemia (CLL)
Myelogenous leukemia ("myeloid" or "nonlymphocytic")	Acute myelogenous leukemia (AML or myeloblastic)	Chronic myelogenous leukemia (CML)

An explanation of acute leukemia

=== General classification ===
Clinically and pathologically, leukemia is subdivided into a variety of large groups. The first division is between its acute and chronic forms:

- Acute leukemia is characterized by a rapid increase in the number of immature blood cells. The crowding that results from such cells makes the bone marrow unable to produce healthy blood cells, resulting in low hemoglobin and low platelets. Immediate treatment is required in acute leukemia because of the rapid progression and accumulation of the malignant cells, which then spill over into the bloodstream and spread to other organs of the body. Acute forms of leukemia are the most common forms of leukemia in children.
- Chronic leukemia is characterized by the excessive buildup of relatively mature, but still abnormal, white blood cells (or, more rarely, red blood cells). Typically taking months or years to progress, the cells are produced at a much higher rate than normal, resulting in many abnormal white blood cells. Whereas acute leukemia must be treated immediately, chronic forms are sometimes monitored for some time before treatment to ensure maximum effectiveness of therapy. Chronic leukemia mostly occurs in older people, but it can occur in any age group.

Additionally, the diseases are subdivided according to which kind of blood cell is affected. This divides leukemias into lymphoblastic or lymphocytic leukemias and myeloid or myelogenous leukemias:

- In lymphoblastic or lymphocytic leukemias, the cancerous change takes place in a type of marrow cell that normally goes on to form lymphocytes, which are infection-fighting immune system cells. Most lymphocytic leukemias involve a specific subtype of lymphocyte, the B cell.
- In myeloid or myelogenous leukemias, the cancerous change takes place in a type of marrow cell that normally goes on to form red blood cells, some other types of white cells, and platelets.

Combining these two classifications provides a total of four main categories. Within each of these main categories, there are typically several subcategories. Finally, some rarer types are usually considered to be outside of this classification scheme.

=== Specific types ===
- Acute lymphoblastic leukemia (ALL) is the most common type of leukemia in young children. It also affects adults, especially those 65 and older. Standard treatments involve chemotherapy and radiotherapy. Subtypes include precursor B acute lymphoblastic leukemia, precursor T acute lymphoblastic leukemia, Burkitt's leukemia, and acute biphenotypic leukemia. While most cases of ALL occur in children, 80% of deaths from ALL occur in adults.
- Chronic lymphocytic leukemia (CLL) most often affects adults over the age of 55. It sometimes occurs in younger adults, but it rarely affects children. Two-thirds of affected people are men. The five-year survival rate is 85%. It is incurable, but there are many effective treatments. One subtype is B-cell prolymphocytic leukemia, a more aggressive disease.
- Acute myelogenous leukemia (AML) occurs far more commonly in adults than in children, and more commonly in men than women. It is treated with chemotherapy. The five-year survival rate is 20%. Subtypes of AML include acute promyelocytic leukemia, acute myeloblastic leukemia, and acute megakaryoblastic leukemia.
- Chronic myelogenous leukemia (CML) occurs mainly in adults; a very small number of children also develop this disease. It is treated with imatinib (Gleevec in United States, Glivec in Europe) or other drugs. The five-year survival rate is 90%. One subtype is chronic myelomonocytic leukemia.
- Hairy cell leukemia (HCL) is sometimes considered a subset of chronic lymphocytic leukemia, but does not fit neatly into this category. About 80% of affected people are adult men. No cases in children have been reported. HCL is incurable but easily treatable. Survival is 96% to 100% at ten years.
- T-cell prolymphocytic leukemia (T-PLL) is a very rare and aggressive leukemia affecting adults; somewhat more men than women are diagnosed with this disease. Despite its overall rarity, it is the most common type of mature T cell leukemia; nearly all other leukemias involve B cells. It is difficult to treat, and the median survival is measured in months.
- Large granular lymphocytic leukemia may involve either T-cells or NK cells; like hairy cell leukemia, which involves solely B cells, it is a rare and indolent (not aggressive) leukemia.
- Adult T-cell leukemia is caused by human T-lymphotropic virus (HTLV), a virus similar to HIV. Like HIV, HTLV infects CD4+ T-cells and replicates within them; however, unlike HIV, it does not destroy them. Instead, HTLV "immortalizes" the infected T-cells, giving them the ability to proliferate abnormally. Human T-cell lymphotropic virus types I and II (HTLV-I/II) are endemic in certain areas of the world.
- Clonal eosinophilias (also called clonal hypereosinophilias) are a group of blood disorders characterized by the growth of eosinophils in the bone marrow, blood, and/or other tissues. They may be pre-cancerous or cancerous. Clonal eosinophilias involve a "clone" of eosinophils, i.e., a group of genetically identical eosinophils that all grew from the same mutated ancestor cell. These disorders may evolve into chronic eosinophilic leukemia or may be associated with various forms of myeloid neoplasms, lymphoid neoplasms, myelofibrosis, or the myelodysplastic syndrome.

=== Pre-leukemia ===
- Transient myeloproliferative disease, also termed transient leukemia, involves the abnormal proliferation of a clone of non-cancerous megakaryoblasts. The disease is restricted to individuals with Down syndrome or genetic changes similar to those in Down syndrome, develops in a baby during pregnancy or shortly after birth, and resolves within 3 months or, in ~10% of cases, progresses to acute megakaryoblastic leukemia. Transient myeloid leukemia is a pre-leukemic condition.
- Clonal hematopoiesis is a common age-related phenomenon with a low risk of progression to myelodysplastic syndrome (MDS) and leukemia. Once MDS has developed, the risk of progression to acute leukemia can be assessed using the International Prognostic Scoring System (IPSS).
- Monoclonal B-cell lymphocytosis has a low risk of progression to B-cell leukemia.

== Signs and symptoms ==
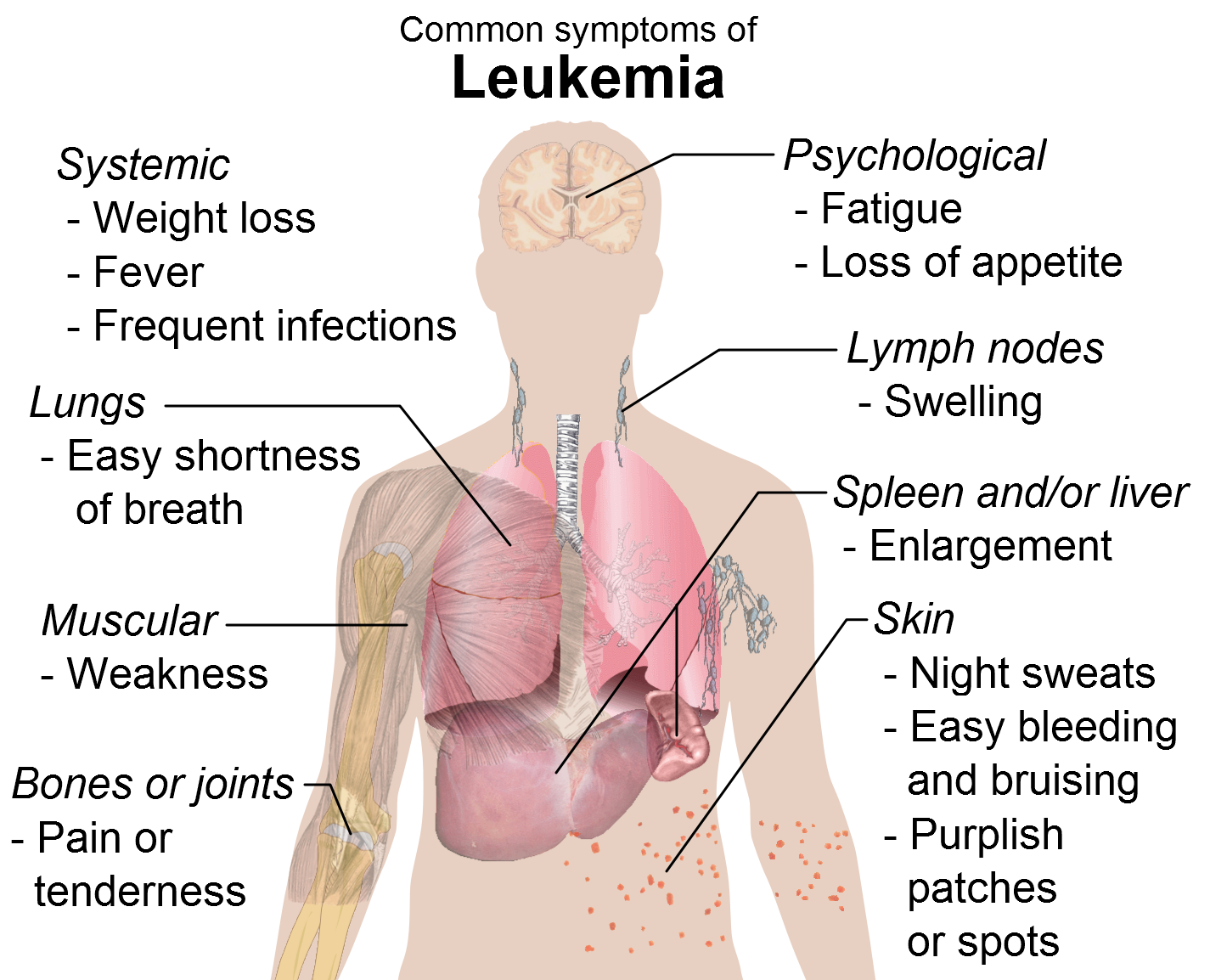
Common symptoms of chronic or acute leukemia

The most common symptoms in children are easy bruising, pale skin, fever, and an enlarged spleen or liver.

Damage to the bone marrow, by way of displacing the normal bone marrow cells with higher numbers of immature white blood cells, results in a lack of blood platelets, which are important in the blood clotting process. This means people with leukemia may easily become bruised, bleed excessively, or develop pinprick bleeds (petechiae).

White blood cells, which are involved in fighting pathogens, may be suppressed or dysfunctional. This could cause the person's immune system to be unable to fight off a simple infection or to start attacking other body cells. Because leukemia prevents the immune system from working normally, some people experience frequent infection, ranging from infected tonsils, sores in the mouth, or diarrhea to life-threatening pneumonia or opportunistic infections.

Finally, the red blood cell deficiency leads to anemia, which may cause dyspnea and pallor.

Some people experience other symptoms, such as fevers, chills, night sweats, weakness in the limbs, feeling fatigued, and other common flu-like symptoms. Some people experience nausea or a feeling of fullness due to an enlarged liver and spleen; this can result in unintentional weight loss. Blasts affected by the disease may come together and become swollen in the liver or in the lymph nodes, causing pain and leading to nausea. Symptoms can be excessive sweating, especially at night, as well as weight loss without attempts at losing weight.

If the leukemic cells invade the central nervous system, then neurological symptoms (notably headaches) can occur. Uncommon neurological symptoms like migraines, seizures, or coma can occur as a result of brain stem pressure. All symptoms associated with leukemia can be attributed to other diseases. Consequently, leukemia is always diagnosed through medical tests.

The word leukemia, which means 'white blood', is derived from the characteristic high white blood cell count that presents in most affected people before treatment. The high number of white blood cells is apparent when a blood sample is viewed under a microscope, with the extra white blood cells frequently being immature or dysfunctional. The excessive number of cells can also interfere with the level of other cells, causing further harmful imbalance in the blood count.

Some people diagnosed with leukemia do not have high white blood cell counts visible during a regular blood count. This less-common condition is called aleukemia. The bone marrow still contains cancerous white blood cells that disrupt normal production of blood cells, but they remain in the marrow instead of entering the bloodstream, where they would be visible in a blood test. For a person with aleukemia, the white blood cell counts in the bloodstream can be normal or low. Aleukemia can occur in any of the four major types of leukemia, and is particularly common in hairy cell leukemia.

== Causes ==
Studies in 2009 and 2010 have shown a positive correlation between exposure to formaldehyde and the development of leukemia, particularly myeloid leukemia. The different leukemias likely have different causes.

Leukemia, like other cancers, results from mutations in the DNA. Certain mutations can trigger leukemia by activating oncogenes or deactivating tumor suppressor genes, and thereby disrupting the regulation of cell death, differentiation, or division. These mutations may occur spontaneously or as a result of exposure to radiation or carcinogenic substances.

Among adults, the known causes are natural and artificial ionizing radiation and petrochemicals, notably benzene and alkylating chemotherapy agents for previous malignancies. Use of tobacco is associated with a small increase in the risk of developing acute myeloid leukemia in adults. Cohort and case-control studies have linked exposure to some petrochemicals and hair dyes to the development of some forms of leukemia. Diet has very limited or no effect, although eating more vegetables may confer a small protective benefit.

Viruses have also been linked to some forms of leukemia. For example, human T-lymphotropic virus (HTLV-1) causes adult T-cell leukemia.

A few cases of maternal-fetal transmission (a baby acquires leukemia because its mother had leukemia during the pregnancy) have been reported. Children born to mothers who use fertility drugs to induce ovulation are more than twice as likely to develop leukemia during their childhoods than other children.

In a recent systematic review and meta-analysis of any leukemia in neonates using phototherapy, typically to treat neonatal jaundice, a statistically significant association was detected between using phototherapy and myeloid leukemia. However, it is still questionable whether phototherapy is genuinely the cause of cancer or simply a result of the same underlying factors that gave rise to cancer.

=== Radiation ===
Large doses of Sr-90 (called a bone seeking radioisotope) from nuclear reactor accidents increase the risk of bone cancer and leukemia in animals and are presumed to do so in people.

=== Genetic conditions ===
Some people have a genetic predisposition towards developing leukemia. Family histories and twin studies demonstrate this predisposition. The affected people may have a single gene or multiple genes in common. In some cases, families tend to develop the same kinds of leukemia as other members; in other families, affected people may develop different forms of leukemia or related blood cancers.

In addition to these genetic issues, people with chromosomal abnormalities or certain other genetic conditions have a greater risk of leukemia. For example, people with Down syndrome have a significantly increased risk of developing forms of acute leukemia (especially acute myeloid leukemia), and Fanconi anemia is a risk factor for developing acute myeloid leukemia. Mutation in SPRED1 gene has been associated with a predisposition to childhood leukemia. Mutation of chromatic looping factors may results on cancer, such as leukemia, as chromatic looping influences gene expression, hence disordered genome linked to disease development.

Inherited bone marrow failure syndromes represent a kind of premature aging of the bone marrow. In people with these syndromes and in older adults, mutations associated with clonal hematopoiesis may arise as an adaptive response to a progressively deteriorating hematopoietic niche, i.e., a depleting pool of Hematopoietic stem cells. The mutated stem cells then acquire a self-renewal advantage.

Chronic myelogenous leukemia is associated with a genetic abnormality called the Philadelphia translocation; 95% of people with CML carry the Philadelphia mutation, although this is not exclusive to CML and can be observed in people with other types of leukemia.

=== Non-ionizing radiation ===
Whether or not non-ionizing radiation causes leukemia has been studied for several decades. The International Agency for Research on Cancer expert working group undertook a detailed review of all data on static and extremely low frequency electromagnetic energy, which occurs naturally and in association with the generation, transmission, and use of electrical power. They concluded that there is limited evidence that high levels of ELF magnetic (but not electric) fields might cause some cases of childhood leukemia. No evidence for a relationship to leukemia or another form of malignancy in adults has been demonstrated. Since exposure to such levels of ELFs is relatively uncommon, the World Health Organization concludes that ELF exposure, if later proven to be causative, would account for just 100 to 2400 cases worldwide each year, representing 0.2 to 4.9% of the total incidence of childhood leukemia for that year (about 0.03 to 0.9% of all leukemias).

== Diagnosis ==
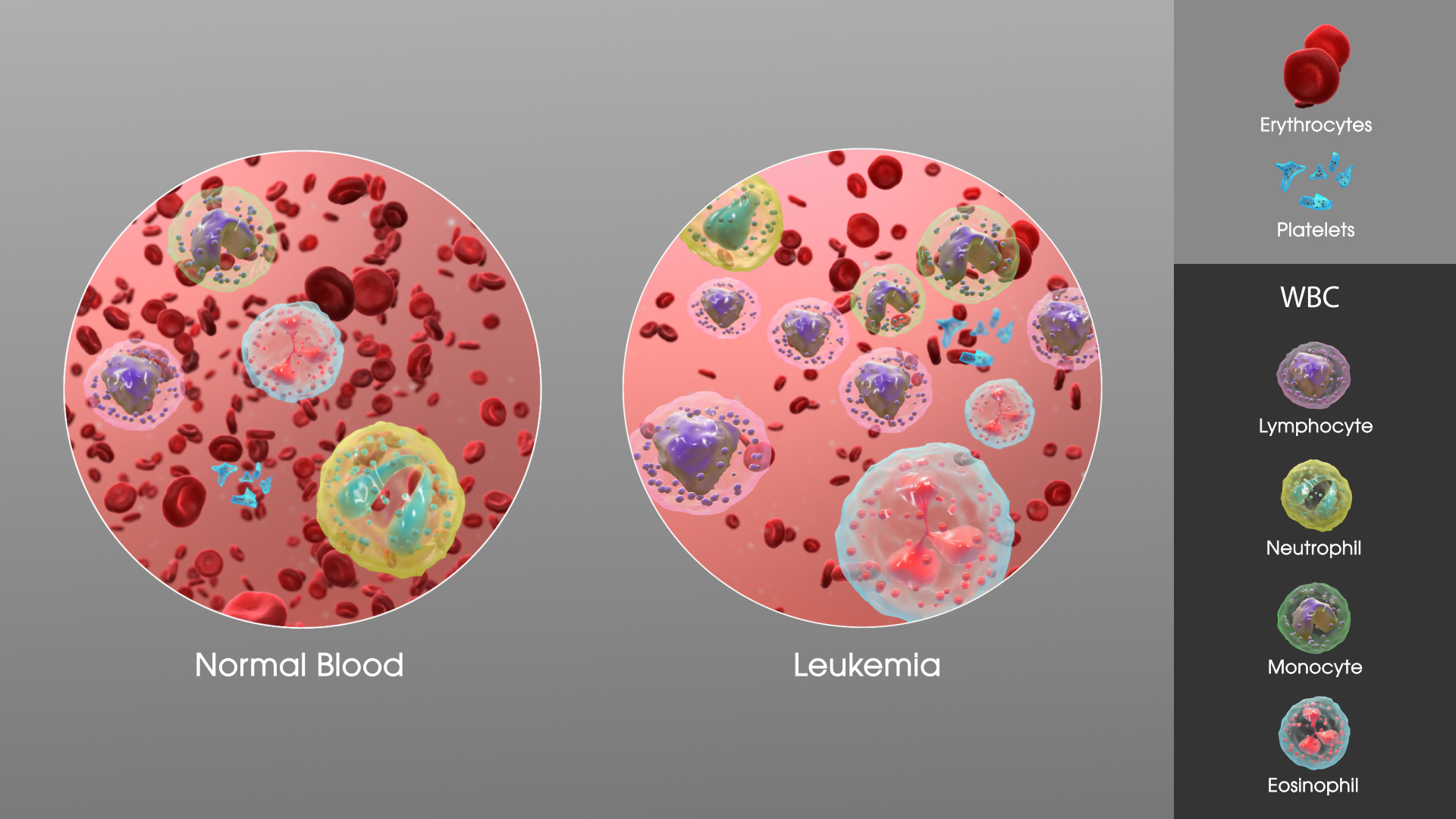
The increase in white blood cells in leukemia

Diagnosis is usually based on repeated complete blood counts and a bone marrow examination following observations of the symptoms. Sometimes, blood tests may not show that a person has leukemia, especially in the early stages of the disease or during remission. A lymph node biopsy can be performed to diagnose certain types of leukemia in certain situations.

Following diagnosis, blood chemistry tests can be used to determine the degree of liver and kidney damage or the effects of chemotherapy on the person. When concerns arise about other damages due to leukemia, doctors may use an X-ray, MRI, or ultrasound. These can potentially show leukemia's effects on such body parts as bones (X-ray), the brain (MRI), the kidneys, spleen, and liver (ultrasound). CT scans can be used to check lymph nodes in the chest, though this is uncommon.

Despite the use of these methods to diagnose leukemia, many people remain undiagnosed because many of the symptoms are vague, non-specific, and can refer to other diseases. For this reason, the American Cancer Society estimates that at least one-fifth of the people with leukemia have not yet been diagnosed.

== Treatment ==
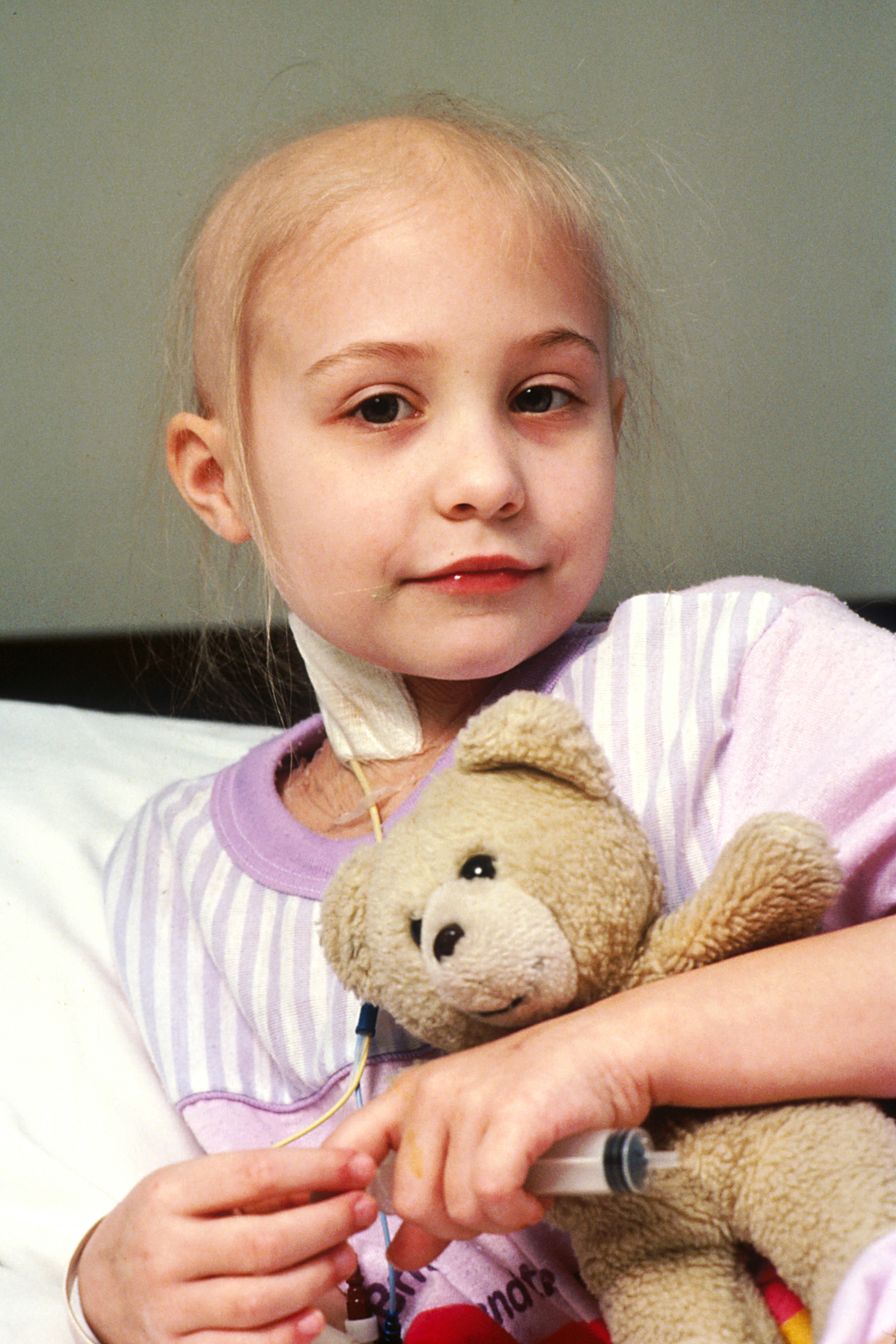
Young girl receiving chemotherapy treatment

Most forms of leukemia are treated with pharmaceutical medication, typically combined into a multi-drug chemotherapy regimen. Some are also treated with radiation therapy. In some cases, a bone marrow transplant is effective.

=== Acute lymphoblastic ===
Management of ALL is directed towards control of bone marrow and systemic (whole-body) disease. Additionally, treatment must prevent leukemic cells from spreading to other sites, particularly the central nervous system (CNS); periodic lumbar punctures are used for diagnostic purposes and to administer intrathecal prophylactic methotrexate. In general, ALL treatment is divided into several phases:

- Induction chemotherapy to bring about bone marrow remission. For adults, standard induction plans include prednisone, vincristine, and an anthracycline drug; other drug plans may include L-asparaginase or cyclophosphamide. For children with low-risk ALL, standard therapy usually consists of three drugs (prednisone, L-asparaginase, and vincristine) for the first month of treatment.
- Consolidation therapy or intensification therapy to eliminate any remaining leukemia cells. There are many different approaches to consolidation, but it is typically a high-dose, multi-drug treatment that is undertaken for a few months. People with low- to average-risk ALL receive therapy with antimetabolite drugs such as methotrexate and 6-mercaptopurine (6-MP). High-risk people receive higher drug doses of these drugs, plus additional drugs.
- CNS prophylaxis (preventive therapy) to stop cancer from spreading to the brain and nervous system in high-risk people. Standard prophylaxis may include radiation of the head and/or drugs delivered directly into the spine.
- Maintenance treatments with chemotherapeutic drugs to prevent disease recurrence once remission has been achieved. Maintenance therapy usually involves lower drug doses and may continue for up to three years.
- Alternatively, allogeneic bone marrow transplantation may be appropriate for high-risk or relapsed people.

=== Chronic lymphocytic ===
==== Decision to treat ====
Hematologists base CLL treatment on both the stage and symptoms of the individual person. A large group of people with CLL have low-grade disease, which does not benefit from treatment. Individuals with CLL-related complications or more advanced disease often benefit from treatment. In general, the indications for treatment are:

- Falling hemoglobin or platelet count
- Progression to a later stage of disease
- Painful, disease-related overgrowth of lymph nodes or spleen
- An increase in the rate of lymphocyte production

==== Treatment approach ====
Most CLL cases are incurable by present treatments, so treatment is directed towards suppressing the disease for many years, rather than curing it. The primary chemotherapeutic plan is combination chemotherapy with chlorambucil or cyclophosphamide, plus a corticosteroid such as prednisone or prednisolone. The use of a corticosteroid has the additional benefit of suppressing some related autoimmune diseases, such as immunohemolytic anemia or immune-mediated thrombocytopenia. In resistant cases, single-agent treatments with nucleoside drugs such as fludarabine, pentostatin, or cladribine may be successful. Younger and healthier people may choose allogeneic or autologous bone marrow transplantation in the hope of a permanent cure.

=== Acute myelogenous ===
Many different anti-cancer drugs are effective for the treatment of AML. Treatments vary somewhat by age and specific AML subtype. Overall, the strategy is to control bone marrow and systemic (whole-body) disease, while offering specific treatment for the central nervous system (CNS), if involved.

In general, most oncologists rely on combinations of drugs for the initial, induction phase of chemotherapy. Such combination chemotherapy usually offers the benefits of early remission and a lower risk of disease resistance. Consolidation and maintenance treatments are intended to prevent disease recurrence. Consolidation treatment often entails a repetition of induction chemotherapy or the intensification of chemotherapy with additional drugs. By contrast, maintenance treatment involves drug doses that are lower than those administered during the induction phase.

=== Chronic myelogenous ===
There are many possible treatments for CML, but the standard of care for newly diagnosed people is imatinib (Gleevec) therapy. Compared to most anti-cancer drugs, it has relatively few side effects and can be taken orally at home. With this drug, more than 90% of people keep the disease in check for at least five years, so that CML becomes a chronic, manageable condition.

In a more advanced, uncontrolled state, when the person cannot tolerate imatinib, or if the person wishes to attempt a permanent cure, then an allogeneic bone marrow transplantation may be performed. This procedure involves high-dose chemotherapy and radiation followed by infusion of bone marrow from a compatible donor. Approximately 30% of people die from this procedure.

=== Hairy cell ===
Decision to treat
People with hairy cell leukemia who are symptom-free typically do not receive immediate treatment. Treatment is generally considered necessary when the person shows signs and symptoms such as low blood cell counts (e.g., infection-fighting neutrophil count below 1.0 K/μL), frequent infections, unexplained bruises, anemia, or fatigue that is significant enough to disrupt the person's everyday life.

Typical treatment approach
People who need treatment usually receive either one week of cladribine, given daily by intravenous infusion or a simple injection under the skin, or six months of pentostatin, given every four weeks by intravenous infusion. In most cases, one round of treatment will produce a prolonged remission.

Other treatments include rituximab infusion or self-injection with Interferon-alpha. In limited cases, the person may benefit from splenectomy (removal of the spleen). These treatments are not typically given as the first treatment because their success rates are lower than those of cladribine or pentostatin.

=== T-cell prolymphocytic ===
Most people with T-cell prolymphocytic leukemia, a rare and aggressive leukemia with a median survival of less than one year, require immediate treatment.

T-cell prolymphocytic leukemia is difficult to treat, and it does not respond to most available chemotherapeutic drugs. Many different treatments have been attempted, with limited success in certain people: purine analogues (pentostatin, fludarabine, cladribine), chlorambucil, and various forms of combination chemotherapy (cyclophosphamide, doxorubicin, vincristine, prednisone CHOP, cyclophosphamide, vincristine, prednisone [COP], vincristine, doxorubicin, prednisone, etoposide, cyclophosphamide, bleomycin VAPEC-B). Alemtuzumab (Campath), a monoclonal antibody that attacks white blood cells, has been used in treatment with greater success than previous options.

Some people who successfully respond to treatment also undergo stem cell transplantation to consolidate the response.

=== Juvenile myelomonocytic ===
Treatment for juvenile myelomonocytic leukemia can include splenectomy, chemotherapy, and bone marrow transplantation.

== Prognosis ==
The success of treatment depends on the type of leukemia and the person's age. Outcomes have improved in the developed world. The average five-year survival rate is 69% in the United States. In children under 15, the five-year survival rate is greater (60 to 85%), depending on the type of leukemia. In children with acute leukemia who are cancer-free after five years, the cancer is unlikely to return.

Outcomes depend on whether it is acute or chronic, the specific abnormal white blood cell type, the presence and severity of anemia or thrombocytopenia, the degree of tissue abnormality, the presence of metastasis and lymph node and bone marrow infiltration, the availability of therapies and the skills of the health care team. Treatment outcomes may be better when people are treated at larger centers with greater experience.

== Epidemiology ==
Deaths due to leukemia per million persons in 2012: 0–7 8–13 14–22 23–29 30–34 35–39 40–46 47–64 65–85 86–132

In 2010, globally, approximately 281,500 people died of leukemia. In 2000, approximately 256,000 children and adults around the world developed a form of leukemia, and 209,000 died from it. This represents about 3% of the almost seven million deaths due to cancer that year, and about 0.35% of all deaths from any cause. Of the sixteen separate sites the body compared, leukemia was the 12th most common class of neoplastic disease and the 11th most common cause of cancer-related death. Leukemia occurs more commonly in the developed world.

=== United States ===
About 245,000 people in the United States are affected with some form of leukemia, including those who have achieved remission or a cure. Rates from 1975 to 2011 have increased by 0.7% per year among children. Approximately 44,270 new cases of leukemia were diagnosed in the year 2008 in the US. This represents 2.9% of all cancers (excluding simple basal cell and squamous cell skin cancers) in the United States, and 30.4% of all blood cancers.

Among children with some form of cancer, about a third have a type of leukemia, most commonly acute lymphoblastic leukemia. A type of leukemia is the second most common form of cancer in infants (under the age of 12 months) and the most common form of cancer in older children. Boys are somewhat more likely to develop leukemia than girls, and white American children are almost twice as likely to develop leukemia than black American children. Only about 3% cancer diagnoses among adults are for leukemias, but because cancer is much more common among adults, more than 90% of all leukemias are diagnosed in adults.

Race is a risk factor in the United States. Hispanics, especially those under the age of 20, are at the highest risk for leukemia, while whites, Native Americans, Asian Americans, and Alaska Natives are at higher risk than African Americans.

More men than women are diagnosed with leukemia and die from the disease. Around 30 percent more men than women have leukemia.

=== Australia ===
In Australia, leukemia is the eleventh most common cancer. In 2014–2018, Australians diagnosed with leukemia had a 64% chance (65% for males and 64% for females) of surviving for five years compared to the rest of the Australian population–there was a 21% increase in survival rates between 1989 and 1993.

=== UK ===
Overall, leukemia is the eleventh most common cancer in the UK (around 8,600 people were diagnosed with the disease in 2011), and it is the ninth most common cause of cancer death (around 4,800 people died in 2012).

== History ==
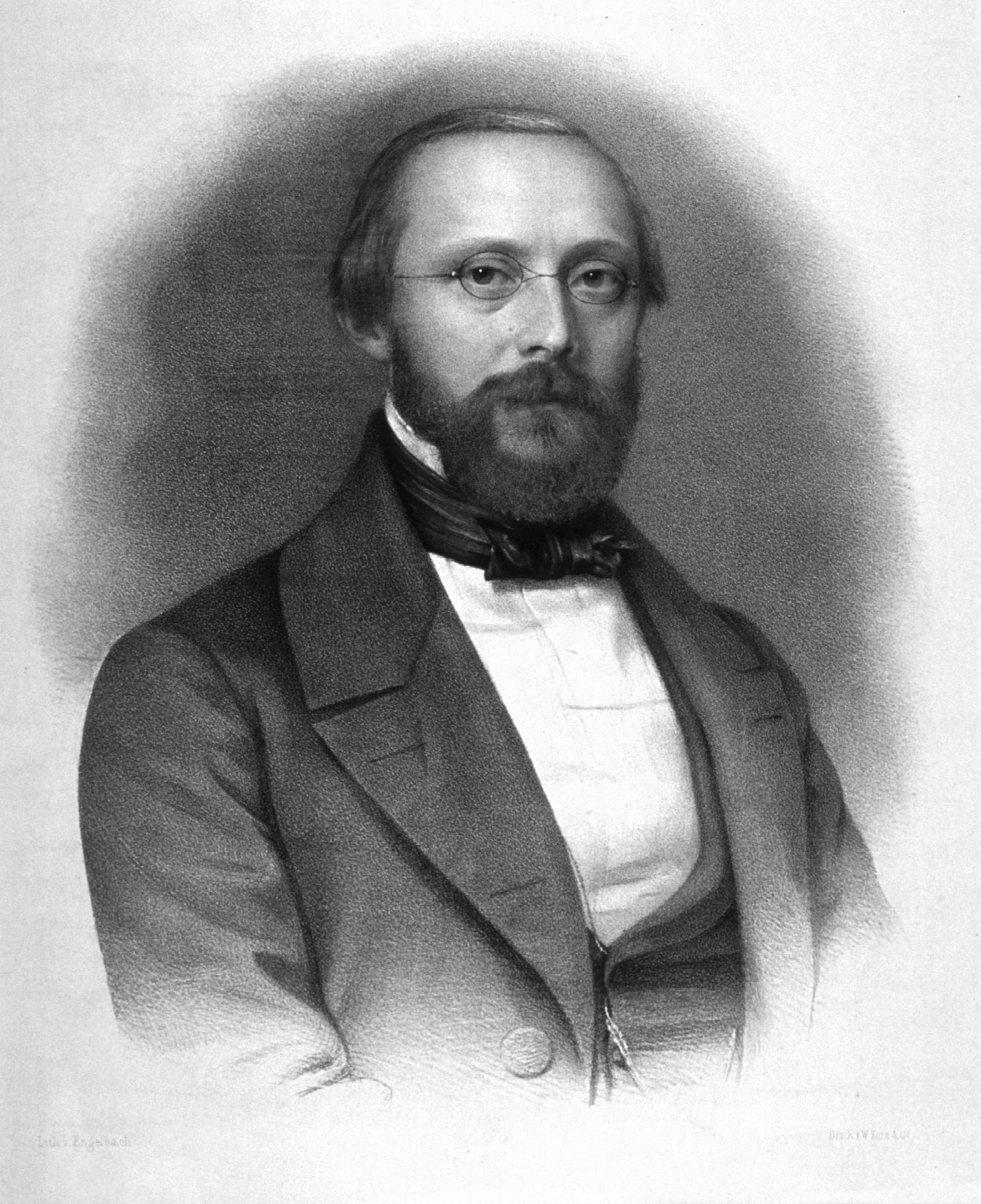
Rudolf Virchow

Leukemia was first described by an anatomist and surgeon, Alfred-Armand-Louis-Marie Velpeau in 1827. A more complete description was given by pathologist Rudolf Virchow in 1845. Around ten years after Virchow's findings, pathologist Franz Ernst Christian Neumann found that the bone marrow of a deceased person with leukemia was colored "dirty green-yellow" as opposed to the normal red. This finding allowed Neumann to conclude that a bone marrow problem was responsible for the abnormal blood of people with leukemia.

By 1900, leukemia was viewed as a family of diseases rather than a single disease. By 1947, Boston pathologist Sidney Farber believed from past experiments that aminopterin, a folic acid mimic, could potentially cure leukemia in children. The majority of the children with ALL who were tested showed signs of improvement in their bone marrow, but none of them were actually cured. Nevertheless, this result did lead to further experiments.

In 1962, researchers Emil J. Freireich Jr. and Emil Frei III used combination chemotherapy to attempt to cure leukemia. The tests were successful, with some people surviving long after the tests.

=== Etymology ===
Observing an abnormally large number of white blood cells in a blood sample from a person, Virchow called the condition Leukämie in German, which he formed from the two Greek words leukos (λευκός), meaning 'white', and haima (αἷμα), meaning 'blood'. It was formerly also called leucemia.

== Society and culture ==
According to Susan Sontag, leukemia was often romanticized in 20th-century fiction, portrayed as a joy-ending, clean disease whose fair, innocent, and gentle victims die young or at the wrong time. As such, it was the cultural successor to tuberculosis, which held this cultural position until it was discovered to be an infectious disease. The 1970 romance novel Love Story is an example of this romanticization of leukemia.

In the United States, around $5.4 billion is spent on treatment a year.

== Research directions ==
Significant research into the causes, prevalence, diagnosis, treatment, and prognosis of leukemia is being performed. Hundreds of clinical trials are being planned or conducted at any given time. Studies may focus on effective means of treatment, better ways of treating the disease, improving the quality of life for people, or appropriate care in remission or after cures.

In general, there are two types of leukemia research: clinical or translational research and basic research. Clinical/translational research focuses on studying the disease in a defined and generally immediately applicable way, such as testing a new drug in people. By contrast, basic science research studies the disease process at a distance, such as seeing whether a suspected carcinogen can cause leukemic changes in isolated cells in the laboratory or how the DNA changes inside leukemia cells as the disease progresses. The results from basic research studies are generally less immediately useful to people with the disease.

Treatment through gene therapy is currently being pursued. One such approach used genetically modified T cells, known as chimeric antigen receptor T cells (CAR-T cells), to attack cancer cells. In 2011, a year after treatment, two of the three people with advanced chronic lymphocytic leukemia were reported to be cancer-free and in 2013, three of five subjects who had acute lymphocytic leukemia were reported to be in remission for five months to two years. Subsequent studies with a variety of CAR-T types continue to be promising. As of 2018, two CAR-T therapies have been approved by the Food and Drug Administration. CAR-T treatment has significant side effects, and loss of the antigen targeted by the CAR-T cells is a common mechanism for relapse. The stem cells that cause different types of leukemia are also being researched.

== Pregnancy ==
Leukemia is rarely associated with pregnancy, affecting only about 1 in 10,000 pregnant women. How it is handled depends primarily on the type of leukemia. Nearly all leukemias appearing in pregnant women are acute leukemias. Acute leukemias normally require prompt, aggressive treatment, despite significant risks of pregnancy loss and birth defects, especially if chemotherapy is given during the developmentally sensitive first trimester. Chronic myelogenous leukemia can be treated with relative safety at any time during pregnancy with Interferon-alpha hormones. Treatment for chronic lymphocytic leukemias, which are rare in pregnant women, can often be postponed until after the end of the pregnancy.

== See also ==
- Acute erythroid leukemia
- Antileukemic drugs, medications used to kill leukemia cells
- Cancer-related fatigue
- Hematologic diseases, the large class of blood-related disorders, including leukemia
- Multiple myeloma
