= Megakaryocyte–erythroid progenitor cell =

Cell type

Megakaryocyte–erythroid progenitor cells (MEPs) are hematopoietic progenitor cells that give rise to erythrocytes (red blood cells) and megakaryocytes, which in turn produce platelets. They represent a key branching point in hematopoiesis, the process in which hematopoietic stem cells (HSCs) differentiate into mature blood cell types. MEPs and other progenitor cells are characterized based on their loss of self-renewal capacity.

== Hematopoietic differentiation ==
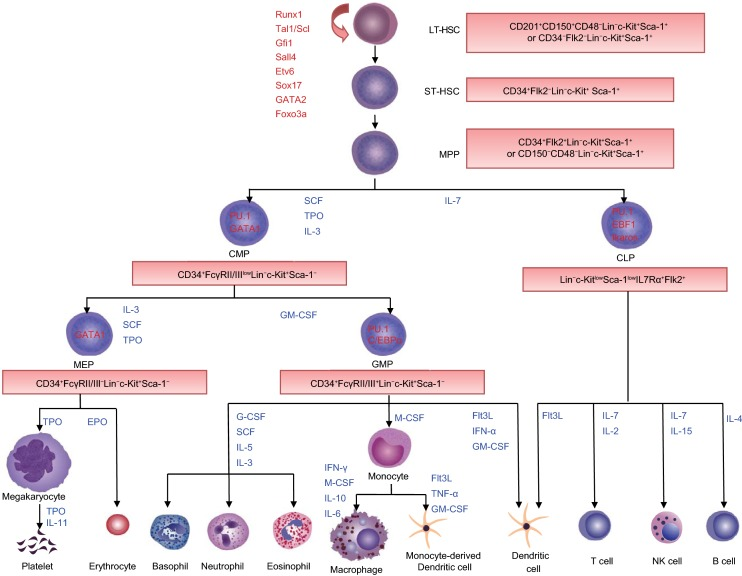
Classical model of hematopoiesis showing differentiation of hematopoietic stem cells (HSCs) into progenitor cells, including MPPs, CMPs, CLPs, MEPs, and GMPs, and their maturation into blood cells.

Hematopoiesis is the process by which the blood cells in the body are produced through the stepwise differentiation of HSCs into progressively more specialized progenitor cells, which ultimately give rise to fully mature blood cell types.

In the classical model of hematopoiesis, HSCs first differentiate into multipotent progenitors (MPPs), which then give rise to the major progenitor populations, including the common lymphoid progenitor (CLP) and the common myeloid progenitor (CMP). The CMP lineage further differentiates into another set of progenitor cells: MEPs and granulocyte-monocyte progenitors (GMPs). GMPs give rise to immune cells, while MEPs differentiate into erythrocytes and megakaryocytes, which give rise to platelets. MEPs differentiate into erythrocytes and megakaryocytes through erythropoiesis and megakaryopoiesis, respectively. Erythrocytes are responsible for oxygen transport via hemoglobin in the blood, while megakaryocytes shed a part of their cytoplasm to give rise to platelets, which play a central role in blood clotting and tissue repair.

== Immunophenotype and lineage specification ==
Immunophenotype is the pattern of surface markers on a cell that are important for characterization and identification of specific cell types. MEPs and other progenitor cells are distinguishable from each other by the different cell surface markers that are added or removed throughout hematopoiesis. These changes in surface receptors reflect the progressive differentiation of progenitor cells during hematopoiesis. Cell surface markers can be easily identified with antibodies in flow cytometry, making them a useful identification tool.

=== MEP Immunophenotype ===
MEPs are identified by a characteristic combination of cell surface markers. Rather than one single marker, the presence, or absence, of multiple markers is essential for this immunophenotype.

MEPs express CD34 and CD38, indicating they are early but committed progenitor cells, while lacking the expression of CD123 and CD45RA. These markers distinguish MEPs from the GMP lineage, as GMPs express CD123 and CD45RA and are committed to the immune cell lineage.

=== Erythrocyte cell lineage ===
Erythrocytes are one of the two main end products of MEPs. First, MEPs differentiate into erythroid progenitors, which undergo further differentiation into erythroblasts. As MEPs begin erythropoiesis, CD34 is lost and the number of CD38 markers decreases. Erythroblasts are identified by the addition of three main cell surface markers: CD71, CD235a, and CD36. The first, CD71, is required for iron uptake and hemoglobin production.

As erythropoiesis progresses, expression of CD71 and CD36 are lost. However, there is continued expression of CD235a. Mature erythrocytes also have no nucleus.

=== Megakaryocyte cell lineage ===
The other blood cell type that arises from MEPs is megakaryocytes, which then give rise to platelets. The first step is megakaryopoiesis, the production of megakaryocytes. Similar to erythropoiesis, the first step is the loss in expression of CD34 and CD38. Megakaryocytes have three major specific surface markers: CD41, CD61, and CD42. The first two surface markers, CD41 and CD61, are platelet related integrins that play an important role in blood clotting and adhesion. As megakaryopoiesis progresses, CD42 appears, indicating the presence of more mature megakaryocytes.

Megakaryocytes are cells in the bone that will shed a piece of their cytoplasm to produce platelets. Megakaryocytes are large cells that cannot circulate through blood vessels easily. Platelets, however, are small mobile cell fragments that can easily circulate through the blood and respond rapidly to injury. The process of platelet production is known as thrombopoiesis. Platelets retain surface markers CD41, CD61, and CD42 (in the form of CD42b).

== Clinical significance of MEP regulation ==
Like many other processes, hematopoiesis is a very tightly regulated biological pathway. In the early 2000s, MEPs were defined as a distinct progenitor cell population in hematopoiesis. The identification of MEPs provides important insight into the organization of hematopoiesis by defining a common progenitor for erythrocytes and platelets within the myeloid lineage. This discovery has improved the understanding of lineage commitment and improved the study of hematologic disorders.

Although erythrocytes and platelets both differentiate from MEPs, their production levels are separately regulated, and thus not completely dependent on each other. Disruptions in the regulation of MEP differentiation can result in abnormal levels of erythrocytes and platelets in the blood, leading to many different hematologic disorders.

Increased production of erythrocytes results in polycythemia, which results in increased blood viscosity and a higher risk of thrombosis. These effects cause increased strain on the heart and impairs normal blood flow. Conversely, decreased production of erythrocytes leads to anemia, which results in reduced oxygen carrying capacity of the blood. With reduced oxygen delivery to the tissues, there is increased cardiac strain and organ dysfunction.

Similarly, overproduction of platelets results in thrombocytosis, which leads to increased clot formation. As a result, there is increased thrombosis risk and impaired blood flow, reducing oxygen delivery to tissues. When MEPs do not produce enough platelets, thrombocytopenia occurs. Low levels of platelets in the blood leads to the impaired ability to stop bleeding, resulting in easy bruising and, in some cases, severe hemorrhage.

== Emerging perspectives ==
While the classical model of hematopoiesis describes distinct progenitor cell stages, such as MEPs, the newer model postulates that differentiation is much more fluid rather than through strictly defined steps. With this in mind, the role/definition of MEPs is being refined. MEPs and other progenitor cells may represent more functionally transitional stages rather than discrete, uniform cell types.
