= PURB =

Protein-coding gene in the species Homo sapiens

Identifiers
- Aliases: PURB, PURBETA, purine-rich element binding protein B, purine rich element binding protein B
- External IDs: OMIM: 608887; MGI: 1338779; GeneCards: PURB

Gene location (Human)
| Chr. | Chromosome 7 (human) |
| Band | 7p13 | Start | 44,876,299 bp |
| Band | 7p13 | End | 44,885,530 bp |

Gene location (Mouse)
| Chr. | Chromosome 11 (mouse) |
| Band | 11 A1|11 4.16 cM | Start | 6,417,599 bp |
| Band | 11 A1|11 4.16 cM | End | 6,425,917 bp |
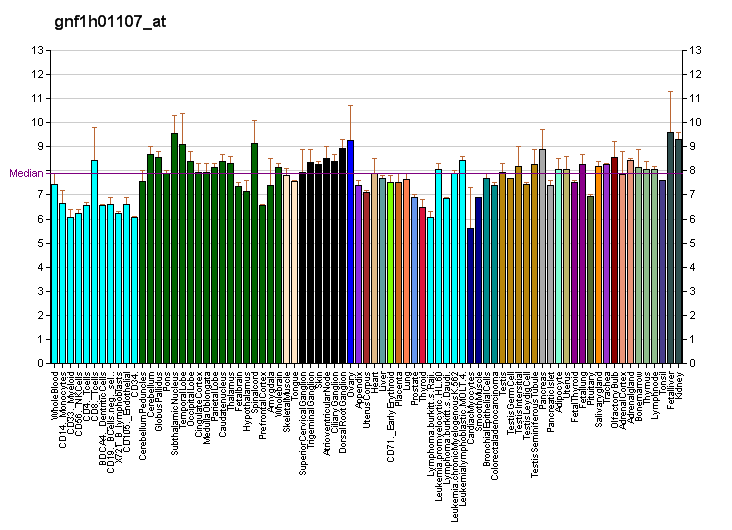
RNA expression pattern
| Bgee | Human / Mouse (ortholog); Top expressed in: skin of arm; cerebellar vermis; pancreatic epithelial cell; gingival epithelium; pancreatic ductal cell; visceral pleura; Brodmann area 23; tibialis anterior muscle; epithelium of nasopharynx; myocardium of left ventricle / Top expressed in: lateral septal nucleus; anterior amygdaloid area; Region I of hippocampus proper; primary motor cortex; piriform cortex; olfactory tubercle; cingulate gyrus; superior colliculus; lateral geniculate nucleus; subiculum; More reference expression data |
| BioGPS | More reference expression data |
Gene ontology
| Molecular function | DNA-binding transcription factor activity; RNA polymerase II transcription regulatory region sequence-specific DNA binding; DNA-binding transcription repressor activity, RNA polymerase II-specific; DNA binding; double-stranded DNA binding; SMAD binding; single-stranded DNA binding; transcription factor binding; mRNA binding; RNA binding; DNA-binding transcription factor activity, RNA polymerase II-specific; purine-rich negative regulatory element binding; sequence-specific DNA binding |
| Cellular component | DNA replication factor A complex; nucleus |
| Biological process | regulation of myeloid cell differentiation; regulation of transcription, DNA-templated; negative regulation of transcription by RNA polymerase II; cell population proliferation; cell differentiation; transcription, DNA-templated; negative regulation of transcription, DNA-templated |
Sources:Amigo / QuickGO
Orthologs
| Databases | NCBI: entry; OMA: entry |
| Species | Human | Mouse |
| Entrez | 5814 | 19291 |
| Ensembl | ENSG00000146676 | ENSMUSG00000094483 |
| UniProt | Q96QR8 | O35295 |
| RefSeq (mRNA) | NM_033224 | NM_011221 |
| RefSeq (protein) | NP_150093 | NP_035351 |
| Location (UCSC) | Chr 7: 44.88 – 44.89 Mb | Chr 11: 6.42 – 6.43 Mb |
| PubMed search |
- Wikidata
| View/Edit Human | View/Edit Mouse |

Transcriptional activator protein Pur-beta is a protein that in humans is encoded by the PURB gene.

== Function ==
This gene product is a sequence-specific, single-stranded DNA-binding protein. It binds preferentially to the single strand of the purine-rich element termed PUR, which is present at origins of replication and in gene flanking regions in a variety of eukaryotes from yeasts through humans. Thus, it is implicated in the control of both DNA replication and transcription.

== Clinical significance ==
Deletion of this gene has been associated with myelodysplastic syndrome and acute myelogenous leukemia.
