= Thrombopoiesis =

Blood platelet formation in bone marrow

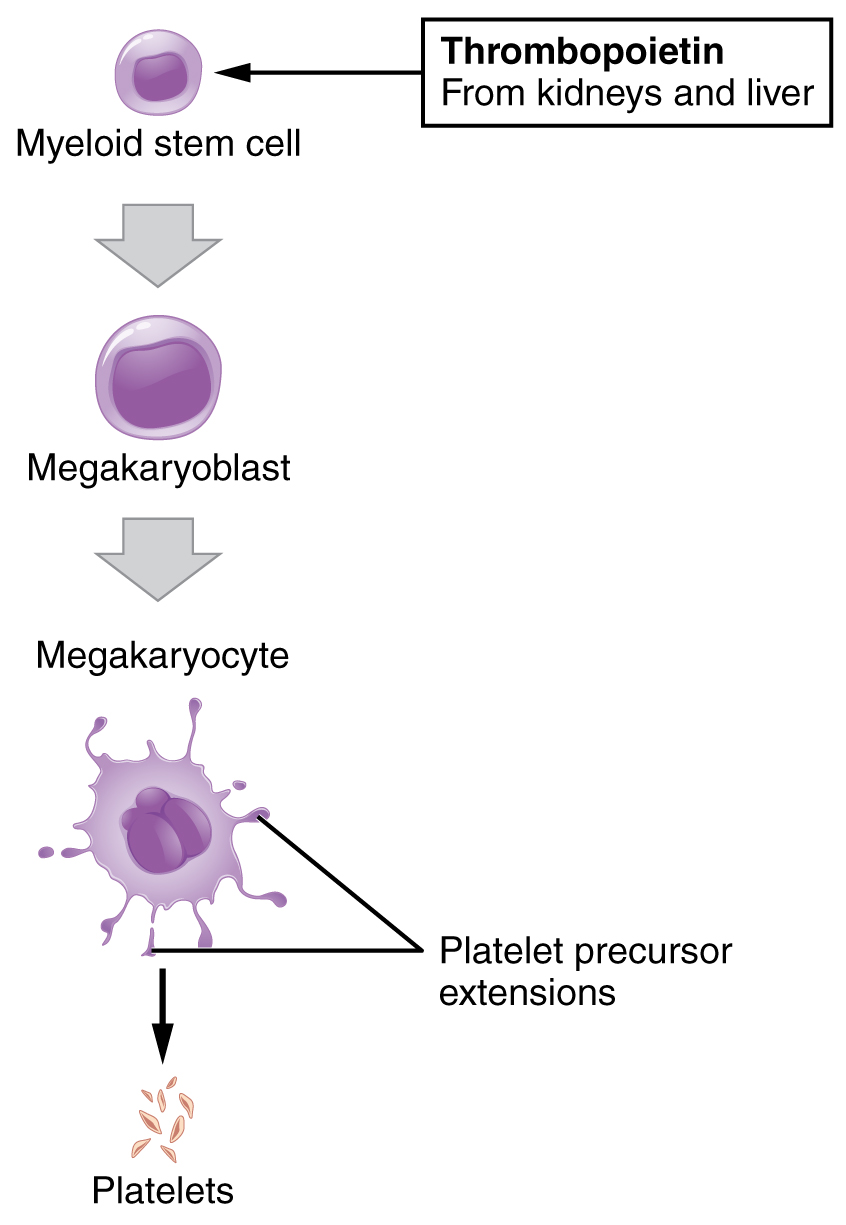

Thrombopoiesis is the formation of thrombocytes (blood platelets) in the bone marrow. Thrombopoietin is the main regulator of thrombopoiesis. Thrombopoietin affects most aspects of the production of platelets. This includes self-renewal and expansion of hematopoietic stem cells, stimulating the increase of megakaryocyte progenitor cells, and supporting these cells so they mature to become platelet-producing cells. The process of thrombopoiesis is caused by the breakdown of proplatelets (mature megakaryocyte membrane pseudopodial projections). During the process almost all of the membranes, organelles, granules, and soluble macromolecules in the cytoplasm are being consumed. Apoptosis also plays a role in the final stages of thrombopoiesis by letting proplatelet processes to occur from the cytoskeleton of actin.

== Platelets ==
Platelets are formed by megakaryocytes and are present in the bloodstream for 5–7 days. Platelets are regulators of hemostasis and thrombosis. Platelets become active in the blood following vascular injury. Vascular injury causes platelets to stick to the cellular matrix that is exposed under the endothelium, form a platelet plug, and then form a thrombus. Platelets are essential in the formation of an occlusive thrombus and are the main target of preventing the formation of an arterial thrombus. Platelets are also important in innate immunity and regulating tumor growth and vessel leakage.

== Megakaryocytes ==
The megakaryoblast is a platelet precursor that undergoes endomitosis to form megakaryocytes that have 8 to 64 nuclei. Megakaryocytes shed platelets into the bloodstream. β1-tubulin microtubules, which are found in megakaryocytes, facilitate this process of shedding platelets into the bloodstream. Megakaryocytes are precursor cells that are highly specialized. Megakaryocytes give rise to 1,000 to 3,000 platelets. Megakaryocytes function in the process of Thrombopoiesis by producing platelets and releasing platelets into the bloodstream. Megakaryocyte development is regulated mainly by thrombopoietin. IL-3, IL-6, and IL-11 also play a role in the development of megakaryocytes by working closely with thrombopoietin.

== Thrombopoietin ==
Thrombopoietin is the main regulator in the process of thrombopoiesis. In the liver and renal tubular epithelial cells, thrombopoietin is constantly being produced. Platelets and platelet precursors clear and destroy the thrombopoietin that is produced so the concentration of plasma thrombopoietin levels and platelet and platelet precursor mass are inversely proportional. If there is less platelet mass present, less thrombopoietin is cleared, which causes an increase in free plasma thrombopoietin that stimulates thrombopoiesis.
