= Retinal precursor cells =

Type of cell in the human eye

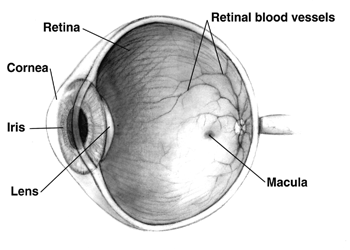
Human eye cross-sectional view grayscale

Retinal precursor cells are biological cells that differentiate into the various cell types of the retina during development. In the vertebrate, these retinal cells differentiate into seven cell types, including retinal ganglion cells, amacrine cells, bipolar cells, horizontal cells, rod photoreceptors, cone photoreceptors, and Müller glia cells. During embryogenesis, retinal cells originate from the anterior portion of the neural plate termed the eye field. Eye field cells with a retinal fate express several transcription factor markers including Rx1, Pax6, and Lhx2. The eye field gives rise to the optic vesicle and then to the optic cup. The retina is generated from the precursor cells within the inner layer of the optic cup, as opposed to the retinal pigment epithelium that originate from the outer layer of the optic cup. In general, the developing retina is organized so that the least-committed precursor cells are located in the periphery of the retina, while the committed cells are located in the center of the retina. The differentiation of retinal precursor cells into the mature cell types found in the retina is coordinated in time and space by factors within the cell as well as factors in the environment of the cell. One example of an intrinsic regulator of this process is the transcription factor Ath5. Ath5 expression in retinal progenitor cells biases their differentiation into a retinal ganglion cell fate. An example of an environmental factor is the morphogen sonic hedge hog (Shh). Shh has been shown to repress the differentiation of precursor cells into retinal ganglion cells.

== Wnt-signaling cascade in retinal development and retinal precursor cells ==
The Wnt signaling pathway is a crucial component of proper retinal development. Briefly, Wnt signaling proteins bind to their receptors, the Frizzled receptor family, and cause activation of molecular cascades within the cell. Fz3 is a Wnt receptor that is eventually restricted to the eye field of the neural plate during development. Overexpression of this receptor causes the formation of ectopic eyes during development, while dominant-negative inhibition of this protein causes improper eye development. Fz4 and Fz5 are found in the distal area of the optic vesicle. This distal region is what that gives rise to the retina. During cell fate determination of the retina, Wnt and Fz expression gradients form in a peripheral to central manner. At this time, Fz4 expression is localized in the periphery and is suggested to play a role in precursor cell maintenance. In contrast to Fz4, Wnt11 is localized in the center of the developing retina and is suggested to play a role in precursor cell differentiation. This expression coincides with the fact that committed cells are located in the center of the developing retina while undifferentiated cells are concentrated in the periphery Fz5 expression is implicated in differentiation of retinal precursor cells to a neural fate.
