= Vesiculopustular eruption and leukemoid reaction in Down syndrome =

- Specialty: Dermatology

Vesiculopustular eruption and leukemoid reaction in Down syndrome is a cutaneous condition, an extensive neonatal vesiculopustular eruption seen in people with Down syndrome.

== See also ==
- Adult T-cell leukemia/lymphoma
- List of cutaneous conditions
