= Promegakaryocyte =

Precursor cell to a megakaryocyte

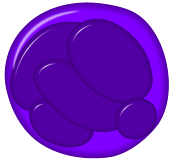
Promegakaryocyte

A promegakaryocyte is a precursor cell for a megakaryocyte, the development of which proceeds as follows:

CFU-Meg (hematopoietic stem cell/hemocytoblast) → megakaryoblast → promegakaryocyte → megakaryocyte

Promegakaryocytes and other precursor cells to megakaryocytes arise from pluripotential hematopoietic progenitors, also known as hemocytoblasts. The megakaryoblast is then produced, followed by the promegakaryocyte, the granular megakaryocyte, and then the mature megakaryocyte. When it is in its promegakaryocyte stage, it is considered an undifferentiated cell.

When the megakaryoblast matures into the promegakaryocyte, it undergoes endoreduplication and forms a promegakaryocyte which has multiple nuclei, azurophilic granules, and a basophilic cytoplasm. The promegakaryocyte has rotary motion, but no forward migration.

Megakaryocyte pieces will eventually break off and begin circulating the body as platelets. Platelets are very important because of their role in blood clotting, immune response, and the formation of new blood vessels.
