= GLIS2 =

Mammalian protein found in Homo sapiens

Identifiers
- Aliases: GLIS2, NKL, NPHP7, GLIS family zinc finger 2
- External IDs: OMIM: 608539; MGI: 1932535; GeneCards: GLIS2

Gene location (Human)
Chr.	Chromosome 16 (human)
Band	16p13.3	Start	4,314,761 bp
Band	16p13.3	End	4,339,597 bp

Gene location (Mouse)
Chr.	Chromosome 16 (mouse)
Band	16 A1|16 2.45 cM	Start	4,412,577 bp
Band	16 A1|16 2.45 cM	End	4,442,788 bp
RNA expression pattern
Bgee	Human / Mouse (ortholog); Top expressed in: right coronary artery; ascending aorta; Descending thoracic aorta; popliteal artery; tibial arteries; human kidney; left coronary artery; apex of heart; right lung; gastric mucosa / Top expressed in: ciliary body; genital tubercle; fossa; internal carotid artery; external carotid artery; human kidney; umbilical cord; medullary collecting duct; iris; tail of embryo; More reference expression data
BioGPS	n/a
Gene ontology
Molecular function	DNA binding; DNA-binding transcription activator activity, RNA polymerase II-specific; protein binding; metal ion binding; nucleic acid binding; RNA polymerase II transcription regulatory region sequence-specific DNA binding; DNA-binding transcription factor activity, RNA polymerase II-specific
Cellular component	cytoplasm; nuclear speck; nucleus; non-motile cilium
Biological process	positive regulation of transcription, DNA-templated; multicellular organism development; cell differentiation; negative regulation of transcription, DNA-templated; regulation of transcription, DNA-templated; negative regulation of transcription by RNA polymerase II; transcription by RNA polymerase II; negative regulation of smoothened signaling pathway; negative regulation of DNA-binding transcription factor activity; nervous system development; positive regulation of transcription by RNA polymerase II; transcription, DNA-templated; cell differentiation involved in kidney development; positive regulation of protein localization to nucleus; kidney development; central nervous system development
Sources:Amigo / QuickGO
Orthologs
Databases	NCBI: entry; OMA: entry
Species	Human	Mouse
Entrez	84662	83396
Ensembl	ENSG00000126603; ENSG00000274636	ENSMUSG00000014303
UniProt	Q9BZE0	Q8VDL9
RefSeq (mRNA)	NM_032575; NM_001318918	NM_031184
RefSeq (protein)	NP_001305847; NP_115964	NP_112461
Location (UCSC)	Chr 16: 4.31 – 4.34 Mb	Chr 16: 4.41 – 4.44 Mb
PubMed search
- Wikidata
View/Edit Human	View/Edit Mouse

GLIS family zinc finger 2 also known as GLIS2 is a human gene.

== Function ==
The protein encoded by this gene is a Kruppel-like transcription factor which functions depending on the gene and promoter context as an activator or repressor of gene transcription. GLIS2 plays a role in kidney development and neurogenesis.

Glis2 knockout mice display decreased size and weight. The kidneys in these mice show progressive kidney atrophy and display symptoms similar to human nephronophthisis. Glis2 plays an essential role in the maintenance of renal tissue through prevention of apoptosis and fibrosis.

== Clinical significance ==
Mutations in the GLIS2 gene are associated with nephronophthisis.
