= Precursor cell =

Partially differentiated usually unipotent cell

Precursor Cell
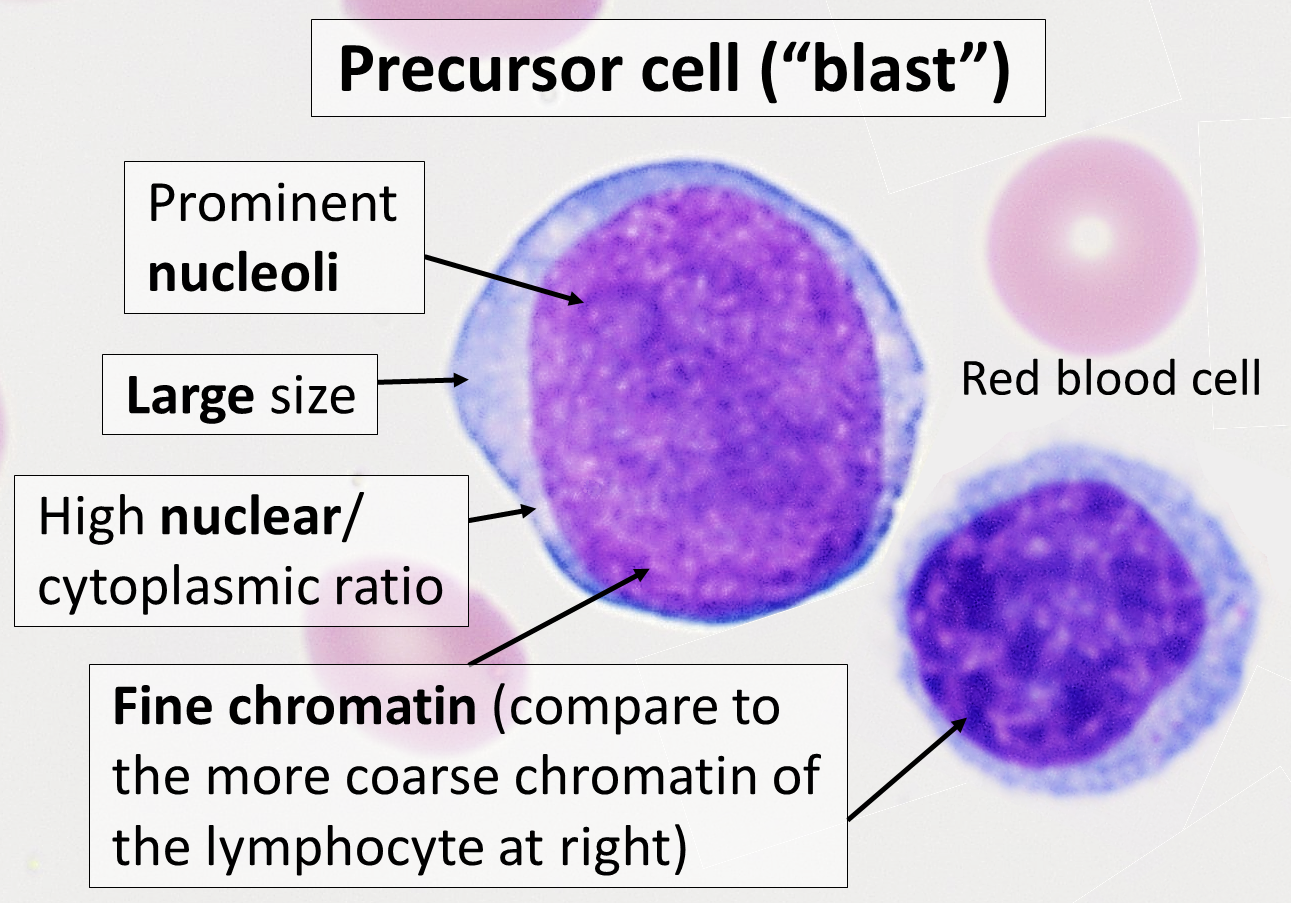
- Cytology of a precursor (blast) cell, with features often seen even after partial differentiation into any of the more specific cell types. Wright's stain.

Identifiers
- NeuroLex ID: sao467424240

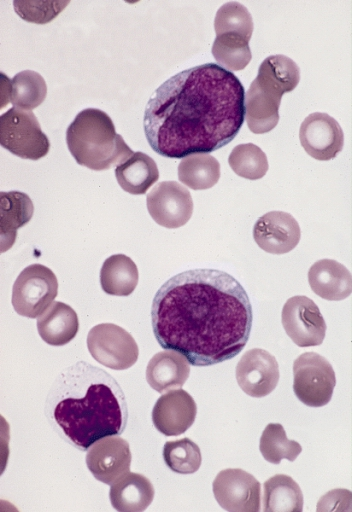
Two myeloblasts with Auer rods

In cell biology, precursor cells—also called blast cells—are partially differentiated, or intermediate, and are sometimes referred to as progenitor cells. A precursor cell is a stem cell with the capacity to differentiate into only one cell type, meaning they are unipotent stem cells. In embryology, precursor cells are a group of cells that later differentiate into one organ. However, progenitor cells are considered multipotent.

Due to their contribution to the development of various organs and cancers, precursor and progenitor cells have many potential uses in medicine. There is ongoing research on using these cells to build heart valves, blood vessels, and other tissues by using blood and muscle precursor cells.

== Cytological types ==
- Oligodendrocyte precursor cell
- Myeloblast
- Thymocyte
- Meiocyte
- Megakaryoblast
- Promegakaryocyte
- Melanoblast
- Lymphoblast
- Bone marrow precursor cells
- Normoblast
- Angioblast (endothelial precursor cells)
- Myeloid precursor cells
- Plasmablast
- Neutrophil progenitor
- Retinal precursor cells

== Medical significance ==
The prospect of regenerative medicine has become increasingly more popular in recent years. Stem cell research has been gaining traction as a possible method of treatment for various human diseases.

One large subcategory of progenitor cells are neural precursor cells (NPCs), which consist of oligodendrocyte, astrocyte, and neuronal precursor cells. Once differentiation into these precursor cells occurs, fate restriction happens and the cells are unlikely to become another type. Some current research is exploring the ability to reverse fate restriction—allowing for precursor cells to become other types of precursor cells. NPCs have a variety of applications in medicine, with research focusing on all subsets. Glial precursor cells, namely oligodendrocyte precursor cells, are being explored for application in treating leukodystrophies—including lysosomal storage disorders and hypomyelination disorders.

Another group of precursor cells called endothelial precursor cells (EPCs), or angioblasts in embryos, are involved in vascular development. There are two developmental methods of the vascular system—vasculogenesis and angiogenesis. Vasculogenesis involves the differentiation of endothelial precursor cells into endothelial cells, which is mostly seen in embryonic development. Originally thought to play no role in adult vascular development, EPCs have demonstrated involvement in pathological neovascularization such as cancer, wound healing, and ischemia.

Although relatively new, neutrophil precursor cells (NePs) have been studied to determine the role of neutrophil progenitor cells in cancer. Neutrophil precursor and progenitor cells are present in bone marrow. According to one study, they are also present in the blood of those diagnosed with melanoma—suggesting the release of NePs into the bloodstream from bone marrow in response to cancer. Additionally, they exhibited tumor-promoting behavior in both mice and humans.

Another category of precursor cells are retinal progenitor cells. Retinal degeneration (RD) is one of the most common causes of blindness in humans—with a variety of diseases falling under the broad category. Some research is looking into the efficacy of using retinal precursor cells as a regenerative treatment for RD. A variety of trials have already been conducted, most demonstrating no rejection of the transplant.
