= CFU-Meg =

Colony forming unit for megakaryocytes in the bone marrow

Details
- Gives rise to: Megakaryocytes and those to platelets
- Location: Bone marrow
- Function: Colony forming unit

Identifiers
- TH: H2.00.04.3.02013

CFU-Meg is a colony forming unit. Haematopoiesis in the bone marrow starts off from a haematopoietic stem cell (HSC) and this can differentiate into the myeloid and lymphoid cell lineages. In order to eventually produce a megakaryocyte, the haematopoietic stem cell must generate myeloid cells, so it becomes a common myeloid progenitor, CFU-GEMM. This in turn develops into CFU-Meg, which is the colony forming unit that leads to the production of megakaryocytes.

Some sources prefer the term "CFU-Mega".

== See also ==
- Thrombopoietin
