= Megakaryocyte =

Bone marrow cell which produces platelets

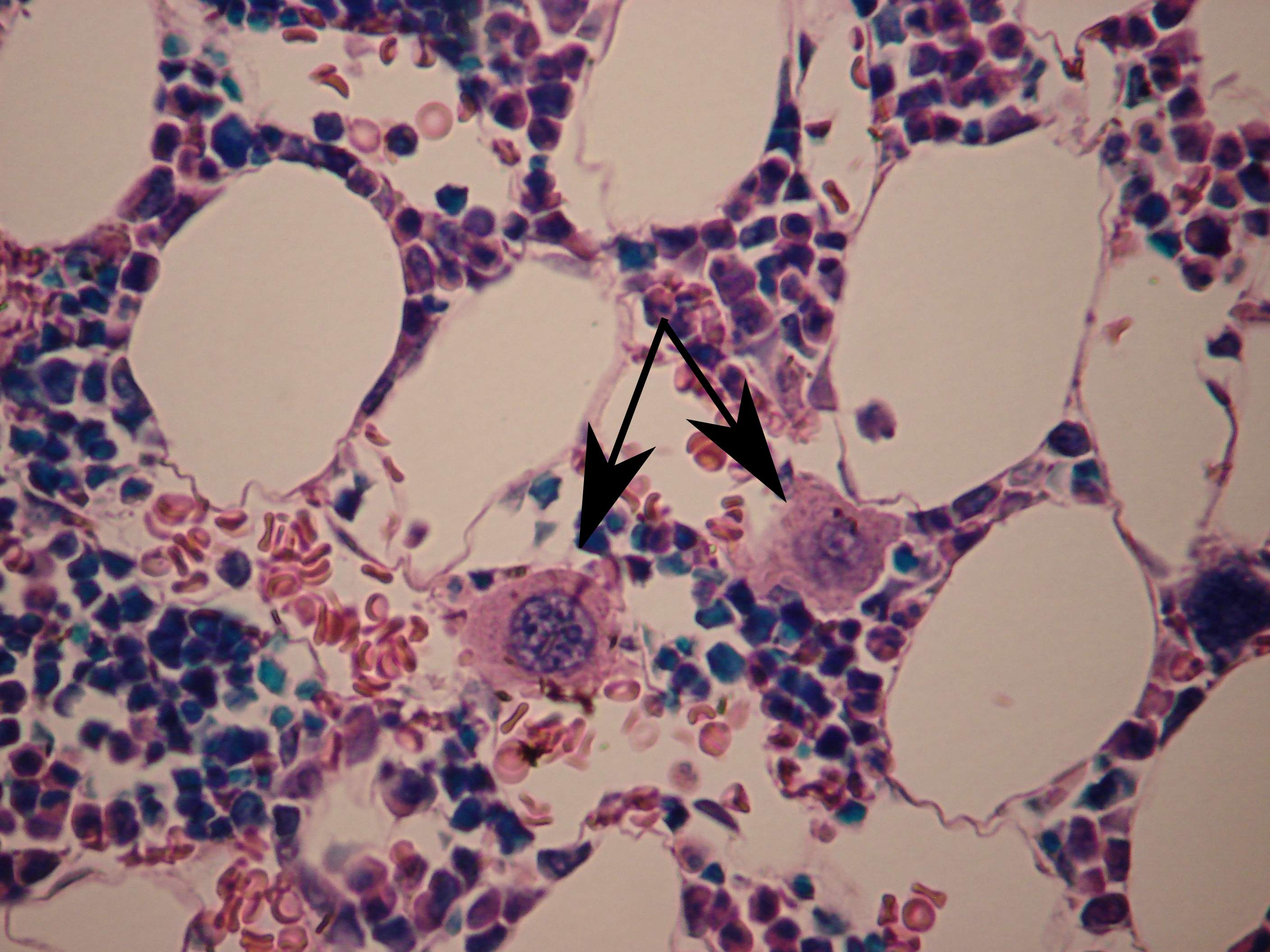
- Two megakaryocytes in bone marrow, marked with arrows.

Details
- Location: Bone marrow
- Function: Platelet production

Identifiers
- Latin: megakaryocytus
- MeSH: D008533
- TH: H2.00.04.3.05003
- FMA: 83555

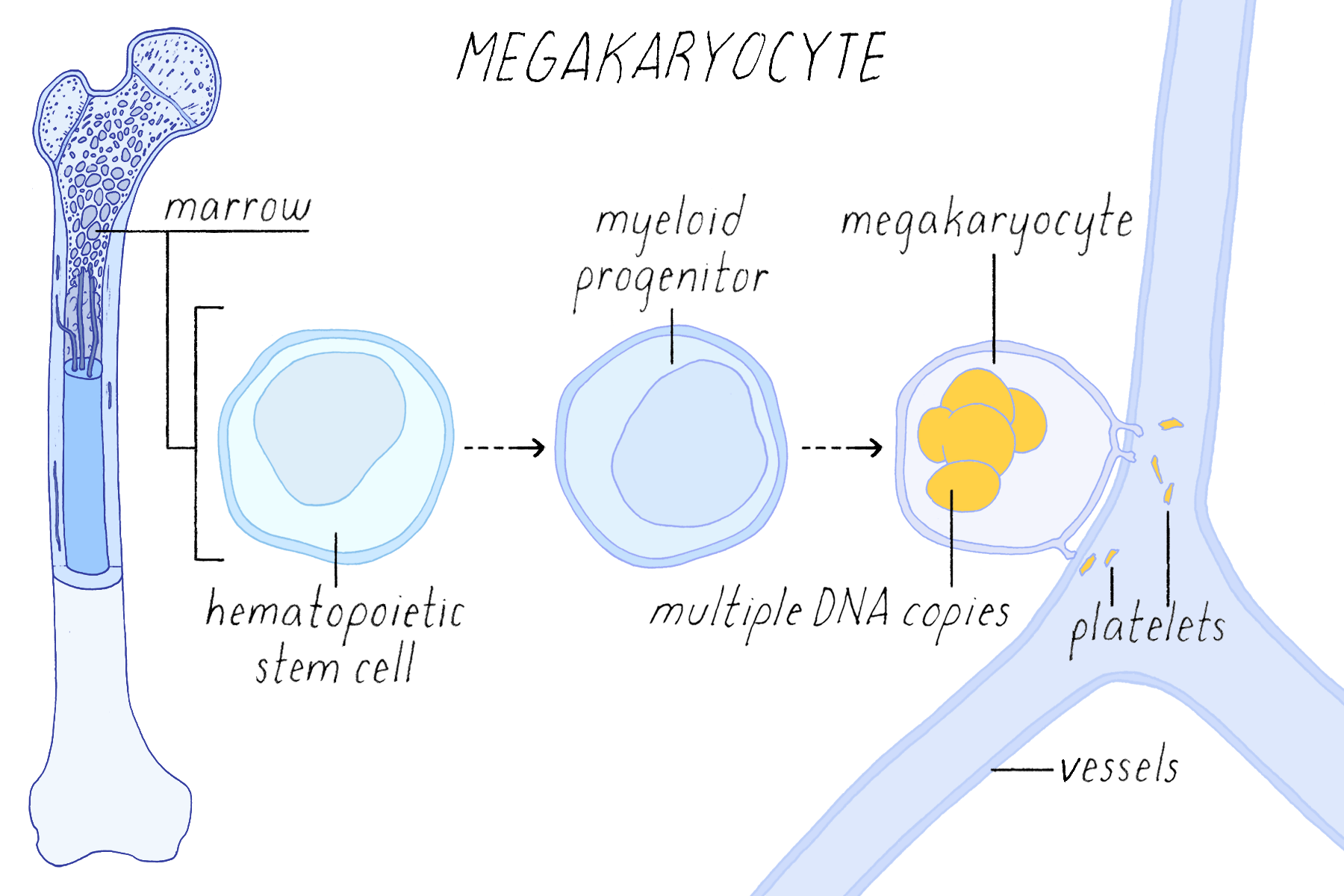
A cell in the bone marrow that produces platelets (which help the blood to clot).

A megakaryocyte (from mega- 'large', karyo- 'cell nucleus' and -cyte 'cell') is a large bone marrow cell with a lobated nucleus that produces blood platelets (thrombocytes), which are necessary for normal clotting. In humans, megakaryocytes usually account for 1 out of 10,000 bone marrow cells, but can increase in number nearly 10-fold during the course of certain diseases. Owing to variations in combining forms and spelling, synonyms include megalokaryocyte and megacaryocyte.

== Structure ==
In general, megakaryocytes are 10 to 15 times larger than a typical red blood cell, averaging 50–100 μm in diameter. During its maturation, the megakaryocyte grows in size and replicates its DNA without cytokinesis in a process called endomitosis. As a result, the nucleus of the megakaryocyte becomes very large and lobulated (8 in number), which, under a light microscope, can give the false impression that there are several nuclei. In some cases, the nucleus may contain up to 64N DNA, or 32 copies of the normal complement of DNA in a human cell.

The cytoplasm, just as the platelets that bud off from it, contains α-granules and dense bodies.

== Heterogeneity and Functional Subpopulations ==
Studies published in 2023 and 2024 on single-cell RNA sequencing have revealed that megakaryocytes are not a homogeneous population, but rather comprise distinct subpopulations with specialized functions. Megakaryocytes can be transcriptionally categorized into platelet generating, niche supporting, immune, and cycling cells, which are distinguished by their unique gene expression patterns and cellular markers.

These functional subpopulations include:

Thrombopoietic megakaryocytes: The classic platelet-producing cells with high expression of genes involved in platelet formation and release.

Immune megakaryocytes: A significant population of these cells have been established to reside in the non-hematopoietic tissues and they display enhanced immune-related characteristics. These cells express higher levels of immune-related genes and can participate in antigen presentation and immune responses.

Niche-supporting megakaryocytes: Megakaryocytes that support hematopoietic stem cell maintenance in the bone marrow niche through production of regulatory factors such as CXCL4 (platelet factor 4), transforming growth factor-β1, and fibroblast growth factor 1.

Cycling megakaryocytes: Proliferating precursor cells that give rise to the mature megakaryocyte subtypes.

== Development ==
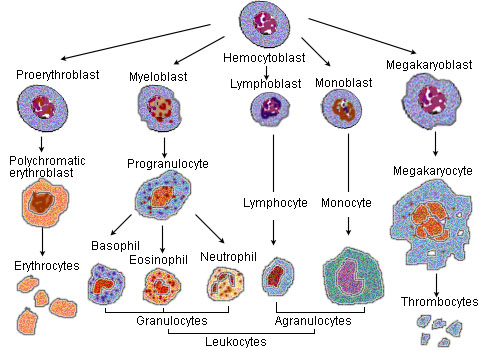
Blood cell lineage

The megakaryocyte develops through the following lineage:

CFU-Meg (hematopoietic stem cell/hemocytoblast) → megakaryoblast → promegakaryocyte → megakaryocyte

Megakaryocytes are derived from hematopoietic stem cell precursor cells in the bone marrow. They are produced primarily by the liver, kidney, spleen, and bone marrow. These multipotent stem cells live in the marrow sinusoids and are capable of producing all types of blood cells depending on the signals they receive. The primary signal for megakaryocyte production is thrombopoietin (TPO). TPO is sufficient but not absolutely necessary for inducing differentiation of progenitor cells in the bone marrow towards a final megakaryocyte phenotype. Other molecular signals for megakaryocyte differentiation include GM-CSF, IL-3, IL-6, IL-11, chemokines (SDF-1, FGF-4), and erythropoietin.

The cell eventually reaches megakaryocyte stage and loses its ability to divide. However, it is still able to replicate its DNA and continue development, becoming polyploid. The cytoplasm continues to expand and the DNA amount can increase up to 64n in humans and 256n in mice. Many of the morphological features of megakaryocyte differentiation can be recapitulated in non-hematopoietic cells by the expression of Class VI β-tubulin (β6) and they provide a mechanistic basis for understanding these changes.

=== Stress-Induced Pathways ===
In recent years, several landmark studies have revealed novel insights into the regulation of megakaryopoiesis under stress conditions. It has been well-documented that systemic inflammation can lead to acute thrombocytopenia or thrombocytosis.

== Function ==
=== Platelet release ===
Once the cell has completed differentiation and become a mature megakaryocyte, it begins the process of producing platelets. The maturation process occurs via endomitotic synchronous replication whereby the cytoplasmic volume enlarges as the number of chromosomes multiplies without cellular division. The cell ceases its growth at 4N, 8N or 16N, becomes granular, and begins to produce platelets. Thrombopoietin plays a role in inducing the megakaryocyte to form small proto-platelet processes. Platelets are held within these internal membranes within the cytoplasm of megakaryocytes. There are two proposed mechanisms for platelet release. In one scenario, these proto-platelet processes break up explosively to become platelets. It is possible to visualize the spontaneous release of platelets using holotomographic live-cell imaging. Alternatively, the cell may form platelet ribbons into blood vessels. The ribbons are formed via pseudopodia and they are able to continuously emit platelets into circulation. In either scenario, each of these proto-platelet processes can give rise to 2000–5000 new platelets upon breakup. Overall, 2/3 of these newly produced platelets will remain in circulation while 1/3 will be sequestered by the spleen.

Example of platelets release in mature megakaryocytes. This footage shows the formation and spontaneous release of platelets (small round-shaped blood cells), imaged with a live-cell imaging microscope.

Thrombopoietin (TPO) is a 353-amino acid protein encoded on chromosome 3p27. TPO is primarily synthesized in the liver but can be made by kidneys, testes, brain, and even bone marrow stromal cells. It has high homology with erythropoietin. It is essential for the formation of an adequate quantity of platelets.

After budding off platelets, what remains is mainly the cell nucleus. This crosses the bone marrow barrier to the blood and is consumed in the lung by alveolar macrophages.

=== Effects of cytokines ===
Cytokines are signals used in the immune system for intercellular communication. There are many cytokines that affect megakaryocytes. Certain cytokines such as IL-3, IL-6, IL-11, LIF, erythropoietin, and thrombopoietin all stimulate the maturation of megakaryocytic progenitor cells. Other signals such as PF4, CXCL5, CXCL7, and CCL5 inhibit platelet formation.

=== Role in Hematopoietic Stem Cell Niche ===
Megakaryocytes play a crucial role in maintaining the hematopoietic stem cell (HSC) niche in the bone marrow, representing a feedback mechanism where HSC-derived cells regulate their progenitors.

==== HSC Quiescence Regulation ====
Recent studies showed that megakaryocytes localize specifically with a subset of HSCs, and promotes their quiescence through the production of CXCL4 (also known as platelet factor-4) and transforming growth factor-β1. Specifically:

- Spatial organization: Almost all VWF+ (megakaryocyte-biased) HSCs exist within 5μm of megakaryocytes, but are not significantly associated with arterioles.
- Factor secretion: Megakaryocytes produce multiple HSC-regulatory factors including CXCL4, TGF-β1, and thrombopoietin that maintain HSC quiescence during homeostasis.

==== Stress Response and Regeneration ====
Functionally, megakaryocytic IGF-1 hypersecretion promotes self-renewal and expansion of HSC through delicately coordinating proliferation, mitochondrial oxidative metabolism and ferroptosis to safeguard efficient HSC regeneration after injury. During stress conditions:

- Myeloablative injury: Even after lethal irradiation-induced myeloablative conditioning, megakaryocytes also survive, migrate to the endosteal niche and drive endosteal niche expansion through the paracrine effect of platelet-derived growth factor-BB to facilitate the engraftment of transplanted HSC.
- FGF1 signaling: FGF1 production by megakaryocytes can also promote HSC expansion under stress.

=== Extravascular Localization and Tissue-Specific Functions ===
Traditionally considered bone marrow–resident cells, megakaryocytes are also found in extravascular locations such as the lungs and spleen, where they exhibit distinct morphologies and tissue-specific functions. In the lungs, extravascular megakaryocytes—smaller and more sessile—constitute up to 80% of the lung megakaryocyte population and express higher levels of cytokines, growth factors, and host defense genes, potentially contributing to inflammation during lung disease. Single-cell RNA sequencing revealed that lung megakaryocytes (MkL) display gene expression patterns similar to antigen-presenting cells, with in vitro and in vivo assays showing their ability to internalize and process antigenic proteins and bacterial pathogens, and to activate CD4⁺ T cells in an MHC II–dependent manner. Additionally, lung megakaryocytes in alveolar and interstitial regions exhibit location-dependent characteristics, responding rapidly to inhaled particles by engulfing them and upregulating inflammatory and thrombopoietic pathways. In contrast, during pathological conditions such as sepsis, megakaryocytes can develop extramedullary in the spleen, producing a unique platelet subpopulation with high CD40L expression capable of inducing NETosis in neutrophils—a function not observed in bone marrow or lung megakaryocytes.

== Clinical significance ==
Megakaryocytes are directly responsible for producing platelets, which are needed for the formation of a thrombus, or blood clot. There are several diseases that are directly attributable to abnormal megakaryocyte function or abnormal platelet function.

=== Essential thrombocythemia ===
Essential thrombocythemia (ET) is a disorder characterized by elevated numbers of circulating platelets. The disease occurs in 1–2 per 100,000 people. The 2016 WHO requirements for diagnosis include > 450,000 platelets/μL of blood (normal 150,000–400,000) and characteristic findings in a bone marrow biopsy. Some of the consequences of having such high numbers of platelets include thrombosis or clots in blood vessels. Thrombi form more frequently in arteries than veins. It seems ironic that having platelet counts above 1,000,000 platelets/μL can lead to hemorrhagic events. Approximately half ET cases are due to a mutation in the JAK2 protein, a member of the JAK-STAT signaling pathway. This mutation induces an unregulated proliferative signal from the thrombopoietin (TPO) receptor in the absence of TPO causing clonal expansion of bone marrow cells, especially megakaryocytes. There is a low risk of transformation to leukemia with this disorder. The primary treatment consists of anagrelide or hydroxyurea to lower platelet levels.

=== Congenital amegakaryocytic thrombocytopenia ===
Congenital amegakaryocytic thrombocytopenia (CAMT) is a rare inherited disorder. The primary manifestations are thrombocytopenia and megakaryocytopenia, for example low numbers of platelets and megakaryocytes. There is an absence of megakaryocytes in the bone marrow with no associated physical abnormalities. The cause for this disorder appears to be a mutation in the gene for the TPO receptor, c-mpl, despite high levels of serum TPO. In addition, there may be abnormalities with the central nervous system including the cerebrum and cerebellum that could cause symptoms. The primary treatment for CAMT is bone marrow transplantation.

Bone marrow/stem cell transplant is the only remedy for this genetic disease. Frequent platelet transfusions are required to keep the patient from bleeding to death until transplant has been completed, although this is not always the case.

There appears to be no generic resource for CAMT patients on the web and this is potentially due to the rarity of the disease.

=== COVID-19 and viral infections ===
Recent research has revealed important roles of megakaryocytes in viral infections, particularly COVID-19. SARS-CoV-2 infection is associated with platelet hyperreactivity and increased rates of arterial and venous thrombosis. SARS-CoV-2 mutations have resulted in several variants with differences in transmissibility, infectivity, and patient outcomes. Studies have shown that megakaryocytes can be directly infected by SARS-CoV-2, affecting both their transcriptome and platelet production.

== History ==
=== Early discovery of megakaryocytes (1869-1890s) ===
The history of megakaryocyte research begins with Italian pathologist Giulio Bizzozero (1846-1901), who first described these cells in 1869 as "giant bone marrow cells" or "Bizzozero's giant bone marrow cells." Bizzozero, a pioneer of histology and one of the founders of modern hematology, was responsible for fundamental advances including the discovery of the hematopoietic function of the bone marrow and the observation of platelets.

In 1868 Bizzozero demonstrated the erythrocytopoietic function of bone marrow, which he illustrated in several works, and in 1869 he discovered the megakaryocytes. However, despite his groundbreaking work identifying both platelets (1881) and megakaryocytes, Bizzozero never recognized the connection between these two cellular elements.

In 1890, William Howell coined the term "megakaryocyte" to describe these large bone marrow cells.

=== Establishment of the platelet-megakaryocyte connection (1906-1920) ===
James Homer Wright provided the crucial evidence in 1906 that megakaryocytes give rise to blood platelets, establishing for the first time the cellular relationship between these giant bone marrow cells and the small circulating platelets.

In 1906, Wright introduced the initial concept that platelets arise from megakaryocyte extensions when he described the detachment of platelets from megakaryocyte pseudopods. Wright used his newly developed Wright's stain to demonstrate similarities between megakaryocyte granules and platelets and through microscopic analysis.

In 1920, Di Guglielmo published detailed morphological observations showing megakaryocytes releasing platelets through two mechanisms: formation of long cytoplasmic extensions and direct fragmentation of cytoplasm - both mechanisms later confirmed by modern research.

=== The search for thrombopoietin (1958-1994) ===
A major milestone in megakaryocyte research came in 1958 when Endre Kelemen and colleagues first coined the term "thrombopoietin" to describe the humoral substance responsible for the production of platelets. Conspicuously absent from this golden age of HGF discovery was a growth factor for platelet production, dubbed thrombopoietin by Kelemen in 1958.

The term thrombopoietin (TPO) was coined in 1958 to describe the humoral substance responsible for platelet production following induced thrombocytopenia by Kelemen, Cserhati, and Tanos, who demonstrated its presence in thrombocythemic sera.

For nearly four decades, scientists searched for this elusive factor. Despite several claims of the purification of thrombopoietin, none of these efforts led to the cloning of the molecule, the sine qua non of HGF identification. The breakthrough came when the proto-oncogene c-Mpl was identified in 1992, providing the key to finally isolating thrombopoietin.

=== Modern era: Molecular cloning and clinical applications (1994-present) ===
Thrombopoietin, the primary regulator of blood platelet production, was postulated to exist in 1958, but was only proven to exist when the cDNA for the hormone was cloned in 1994. In 1994, five independent research teams simultaneously cloned thrombopoietin using different approaches, ending the 36-year search for this crucial hormone.

This discovery revolutionized understanding of megakaryocyte biology and platelet production, leading to new therapeutic approaches for thrombocytopenia and deeper insights into hematopoietic stem cell regulation.

== See also ==
- List of distinct cell types in the adult human body
