= Megakaryoblast =

Precursor cell to a promegakaryocyte in the bone marrow

- Haematopoiesis

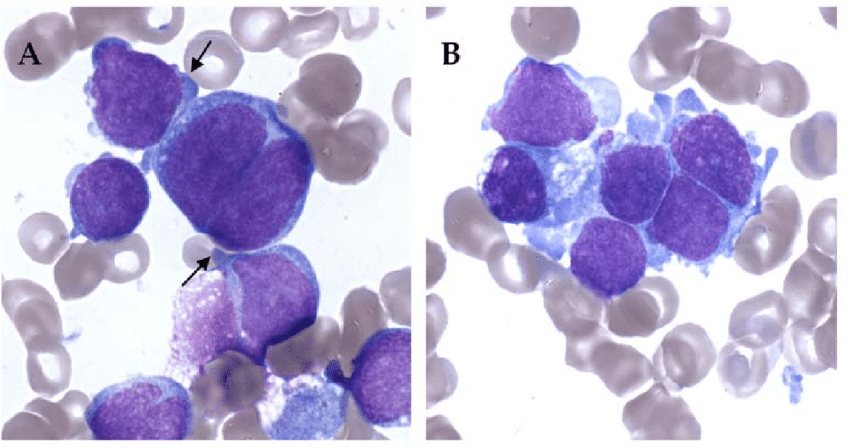
- Bone marrow smears of acute megakaryoblastic leukemia, with May-Grün-wald-Giemsa staining, ×100. (A) Cytoplasmic blebs (black arrow) and binucleated cell. (B) Cell cluster giving a pseudo-solid tumor aspect of AMKL.

Identifiers
- TH: H2.00.04.3.05002
- FMA: 84235

A megakaryoblast (from mega- 'large'; karyo- 'cell nucleus' and -blast 'precursor cell') is a precursor cell to a promegakaryocyte. During thrombopoiesis, the promegakaryocyte matures into the form of a megakaryocyte. From the megakaryocyte, platelets are formed. The megakaryoblast is the beginning of the thrombocytic series or platelet forming series.

Megakaryoblasts typically have a large oval-shaped nucleus or a nucleus that is lobed with many nuclei. The megakaryoblast resembles the myeloblast or lymphoblast morphologically; however the megakaryoblast varies in phenotype and the structure viewed with electron microscopy.

Increased amounts of megakaryoblasts in the bone marrow may indicate a disease state. An example of this is acute megakaryoblastic leukemia, which occurs when the level of megakaryoblasts in the bone marrow exceeds 20%.

== Development ==
The megakaryocyte develops through the following lineage:

CFU-Meg (hematopoietic stem cell/hemocytoblast) → megakaryoblast → promegakaryocyte → megakaryocyte

The megakaryoblast is derived from colony forming units (CFU-Meg) of hematopoietic stem cells found in red bone marrow. There are biomarkers found on the surface of hemopoietic stem cells that are used as identifiers for megakaryoblasts and other precursor cells. Two of the committed biomarkers are CD34- and CD150+. The CFU-Meg, which forms megakaryoblasts, is derived from the colony forming units that form myeloid cells (CFU-GEMM). The CFU-GEMM is also referred to as common myeloid progenitor cells giving rise to various hemopoietic cell lines.

Once formed, megakaryoblasts become promegakaryocytes through one or two cycles of endomitosis, which is the division of chromosomes without the cell dividing via cytokinesis. Endomitosis creates cells with one nucleus and multiple chromosome copies. The promegakaryocytes continue the process of endomitosis, which results in the formation of granular megakaryocytes as the nucleus forms lobes with increased volumes. The megakaryocytes release the platelets into the blood stream.

The process of platelet production, beginning with the formation of megakaryoblasts, takes about 7 days. Once in the blood stream, platelets last about 8 to 10 days.

== Structure ==
Megakaryoblasts can range from 6μm to 24μm in diameter. The megakaryoblast has a high nucleus to cytoplasm ratio with a nucleus that may be 3 to 5 times the size of the cytoplasm. The nucleus is generally oval, kidney shaped or lobed. Several nucleoli are visible, along with loose chromatin. The chromatin may vary from cell to cell, ranging from fine to heavy and dense. The cytoplasm is generally basophilic agranular (lacking granules) and will usually stain blue. Megakaryoblasts tend to be smaller in size and lacking granules, though the larger cells may contain fine granules.

Compared to megakaryoblasts, promegakaryocytes and granular megakaryocytes are both larger and contain less basophilic cytoplasm with granules. Promegakaryocytes are usually about 15μm to 30μm in diameter with a lobed nucleus and some azurophil granules within moderately basophilic cytoplasm. Granular megakaryocytes are typically 40μm to 60μm in diameter with a large multi-lobed nucleus and an abundance of azurohpil granules within slightly basophilic cytoplasm.

== Associated Diseases ==
- Acute megakaryoblastic leukemia
