= Core binding factor =

Type of transcription factor

The core binding factor (CBF) is a group of heterodimeric transcription factors and coregulators.

Core binding factors are composed of:

- a non-DNA-binding CBFβ chain (InterPro: IPR003417)
  - Human: CBFB
- a DNA-binding CBFα chain (InterPro: IPR016554)
  - Human: RUNX1, RUNX2, RUNX3

== See also ==
- AI-10-49, an anti-leukemic drug under development.
