= TBX21 =

Protein-coding gene in the species Homo sapiens

Identifiers
- Aliases: TBX21, T-PET, T-bet, TBET, TBLYM, T-box 21, T-box transcription factor 21, IMD88
- External IDs: OMIM: 604895; MGI: 1888984; GeneCards: TBX21

Gene location (Human)
Chr.	Chromosome 17 (human)
Band	17q21.32	Start	47,733,236 bp
Band	17q21.32	End	47,746,122 bp

Gene location (Mouse)
Chr.	Chromosome 11 (mouse)
Band	11|11 D	Start	96,988,897 bp
Band	11|11 D	End	97,006,157 bp
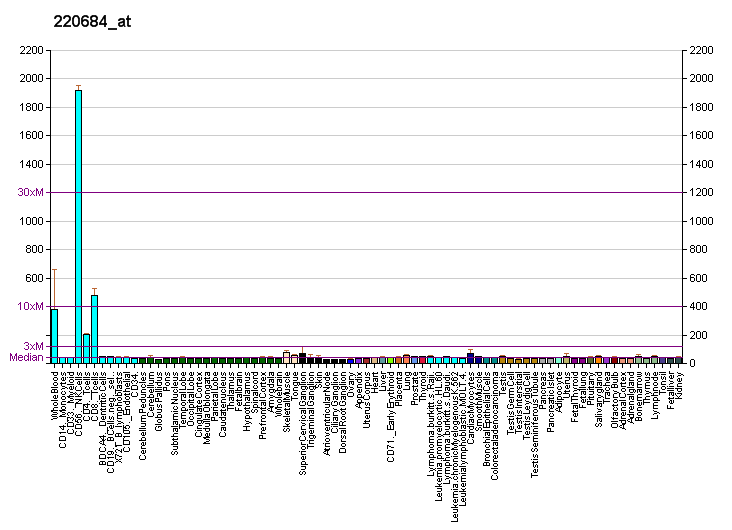
RNA expression pattern
Bgee	Human / Mouse (ortholog); Top expressed in: granulocyte; blood; testicle; spleen; lymph node; bone marrow cell; tibialis anterior muscle; mucosa of ileum; upper lobe of left lung; mononuclear cell / Top expressed in: female urethra; blood; olfactory bulb; embryo; spleen; mesenteric lymph nodes; spinal ganglia; extraocular muscle; thymus; granulocyte; More reference expression data
BioGPS	More reference expression data
Gene ontology
Molecular function	DNA-binding transcription factor activity; DNA binding; DNA-binding transcription repressor activity, RNA polymerase II-specific; sequence-specific DNA binding; protein binding; DNA-binding transcription factor activity, RNA polymerase II-specific
Cellular component	soma; nucleus
Biological process	multicellular organism development; positive regulation of transcription, DNA-templated; cellular response to organic substance; positive regulation of isotype switching to IgG isotypes; response to virus; T cell differentiation; regulation of transcription, DNA-templated; lymphocyte migration; transcription, DNA-templated; regulation of immune response; negative regulation of transcription by RNA polymerase II; negative regulation of interleukin-2 production; proteasome-mediated ubiquitin-dependent protein catabolic process; regulation of T cell differentiation; negative regulation of transcription, DNA-templated; negative regulation of T-helper 17 cell differentiation; negative regulation of T-helper 17 cell lineage commitment; negative regulation of T-helper 2 cell cytokine production; positive regulation of gene expression
Sources:Amigo / QuickGO
Orthologs
Databases	NCBI: entry; OMA: entry
Species	Human	Mouse
Entrez	30009	57765
Ensembl	ENSG00000073861	ENSMUSG00000001444
UniProt	Q9UL17	Q9JKD8
RefSeq (mRNA)	NM_013351	NM_019507
RefSeq (protein)	NP_037483	NP_062380
Location (UCSC)	Chr 17: 47.73 – 47.75 Mb	Chr 11: 96.99 – 97.01 Mb
PubMed search
- Wikidata
View/Edit Human	View/Edit Mouse

T-box transcription factor TBX21, also called T-bet (T-box expressed in T cells), is a protein that in humans is encoded by the TBX21 gene. Though being for long thought of only as a master regulator of type 1 immune response, T-bet has recently been shown to be implicated in development of various immune cell subsets and maintenance of mucosal homeostasis.

== Function ==
This gene is a member of a phylogenetically conserved family of genes that share a common DNA-binding domain, the T-box. T-box genes encode transcription factors involved in the regulation of developmental processes. This gene is the human ortholog of mouse Tbx21/Tbet gene. Studies in mouse show that Tbx21 protein is a Th1 cell-specific transcription factor that controls the expression of the hallmark Th1 cytokine, interferon-gamma (IFNg). Expression of the human ortholog also correlates with IFNg expression in Th1 and natural killer cells, suggesting a role for this gene in initiating Th1 lineage development from naive Th precursor cells.

The function of T-bet is best known in T helper cells (Th cells). In naïve Th cells the gene is not constitutively expressed, but can be induced via 2 independent signalling pathways, IFNg-STAT1 and IL-12-STAT4 pathways. Both need to cooperate to reach stable Th1 phenotype. Th1 phenotype is also stabilised by repression of regulators of other Th cell phenotypes (Th2 and Th17). In a typical scenario it is thought that IFNg and T cell receptor (TCR) signalling initiates the expression of Tbet, and once TCR signalling stops, signalling via IL-12 receptor can come to play as it was blocked by repression of expression of one of its receptor subunits (IL12Rb2) by TCR signalling. IL-2 signalling enhances the expression of IL-12R. The 2-step expression of T-bet can be viewed as a safety mechanism of sort, which ensures, that cells commit to the Th1 phenotype only when desired.

T-bet controls transcription of many genes, for example proinflammatory cytokines like lymphotoxin-a, tumour necrosis factor and ifng, which is a hallmark cytokine of type one immunity. Certain chemokines are also regulated by T-bet, namely xcl1, ccl3, ccl4 and chemokine receptors cxcr3, ccr5. The expression of T-bet controlled genes is facilitated by 2 distinct mechanisms: chromatin remodelation via enzyme recruitment and direct binding to enhancer sequences promoting transcription or 3D gene structure supporting transcription. T-bet also recruits other transcription factors like HLX, RUNX1, RUNX3 which aid it in setting Th1 transcription profile.

Apart from promoting type 1 immune response (Th1), T-bet also suppresses the other types of immune response. Type 2 immune response (Th2) phenotype is repressed by sequestering of its master regulator, GATA3 away from its target genes. Gata3 expression is further silenced by promotion of silencing epigenetic changes in its region. In addition to that the Th2 specific cytokines are also silenced by binding of T-bet and RUNX3 to il4 silencer region. Type 17 immune response (Th17) phenotype is suppressed by RUNX1 recruitment, which disallows it to mediate Th17 specific genes, like rorc, a Th17 master regulator. Rorc is also silenced by epigenetic changes promoted by T-bet and STAT4.

T-bet also performs function in cytotoxic T cells and B cells. In cytotoxic T cells it promotes IFNg, granzyme B expression and in cooperation with another transcription factor EOMES their maturation. The role of T-bet in B cells seems to be to direct the cell towards type 1 immune response expression profile, which involves secretion of antibodies IGg1 and IGg3 and is usually elevated during viral infections. These populations of B cells differ from standard ones by their lack of receptors CD21 and CD27, also given that these cells have undergone antibody class switch, they are regarded as memory B cells. These cells have been shown to secrete IFNg and in vitro to polarise naïve T helper cells towards Th1 phenotype. Populations of T-bet positive B cells were also identified in various autoimmune diseases like systemic lupus erythematosus, Crohn's disease, multiple sclerosis and rheumatoid arthritis.

== Role in mucosal homeostasis ==
It has been identified that T-bet contributes to the maintenance of mucosal homeostasis and mucosal immune response. Mice lacking adapative immune cells and T-bet (RAG -/-, T-bet -/-) developed disease similar to human ulcerative colitis (hence the name TRUC), which was later attributed to the outgrowth Gram-negative bacteria, namely Helicobacter typhlonius. The dysbiosis appears to be a consequence of multiple factors, firstly the innate lymphoid cells 1 (ILC1) population and a subset of ILC3s are missing, because the expression of T-bet is needed for their maturation. Secondly, T-bet ablation causes increased levels of TNF, as its expression is not repressed in dendritic cells and immune system is more biased away from Th1.

== Role in disease ==
=== Atherosclerosis ===
Atherosclerosis is an autoimmune disease caused by inflammation and associated infiltration of immune cells in fatty deposits in arteries called atherosclerosis plaques. Th1 cells are responsible for production of proinflammatory cytokines contributing to the progression of the disease by promoting expression of adhesive (e.g., ICAM1) and homing molecules (mainly CCR5) needed for cellular migration. Experimental vaccination of patients with peptides derived from apolipoprotein B, part of low-density lipoprotein, which is deposited on arterial walls, has shown increased T regulatory cells (TREGs) and cytotoxic T cells. The vaccination has showed smaller Th1 differentiation, though the mechanism behind it remains unresolved. Currently it is hypothesised that the decrease of Th1 differentiation is caused by the destruction of dendritic cells presenting auto antigens by cytotoxic T cells and increased differentiation of TREGs suppressing immune response. Taken together T-bet might serve as a potential target in treatment of atherosclerosis.

=== Asthma ===
The transcription factor encoded by TBX21 is T-bet, which regulates the development of naive T lymphocytes. Asthma is a disease of chronic inflammation, and it is known that transgenic mice born without TBX21 spontaneously develop abnormal lung function consistent with asthma. It is thought that TBX21, therefore, may play a role in the development of asthma in humans as well.

=== Experimental autoimmune encephalomyelitis ===
Initially it was thought that experimental autoimmune encephalomyelitis (EAE) is caused by autoreactive Th1 cells. T-bet-deficient mice were resistant to EAE. However, later research has discovered, that not only Th1 but also Th17 and ThGM-CSF cells are the cause of immunopathology. Interestingly, IFNg, a main product of T-bet, has shown bidirectional effect in EAE. Injection of IFNg during acute stage worsens the course of the disease, presumably by strengthening Th1 response, however injection of IFNg in chronic stage has shown suppressive effect on EAE symptoms. Currently it is thought that IFNg stops T helper cells from committing for example to the Th17 phenotype, stimulates indoleamine 2,3-dioxygenase transcription (kynurenines or kyn pathway) in certain dendritic cells, stimulates cytotoxic T cells, downregulates T cell trafficking and limits their survival. T-bet and its controlled genes remain a possible target in treatment of neurological autoimmune diseases.
