= HLX =

HLX may refer to:

- HLX (gene), a gene in humans that encodes the H2.0 homeobox protein
- HLX-1, an intermediate-mass black hole
- Hapag-Lloyd Express, a former German airline
- HLX (game), codename for a video game project by Valve
