= TBR1 =

Protein-coding gene in Homo sapiens

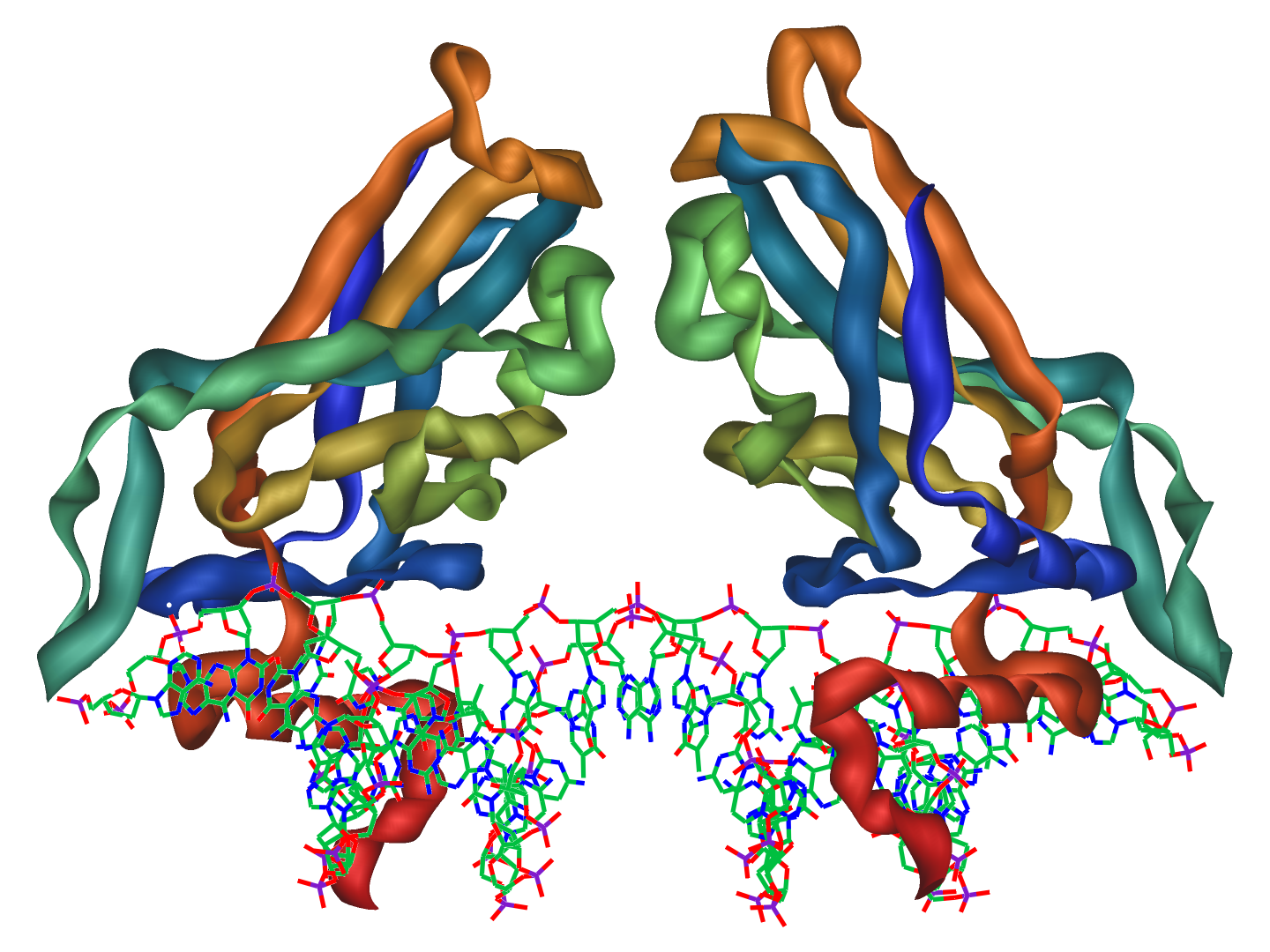

Identifiers
- Aliases: TBR1, TBR-1, TES-56, T-box, brain 1, IDDAS, T-box brain transcription factor 1
- External IDs: OMIM: 604616; MGI: 107404; GeneCards: TBR1

Gene location (Human)
Chr.	Chromosome 2 (human)
Band	2q24.2	Start	161,416,297 bp
Band	2q24.2	End	161,425,870 bp

Gene location (Mouse)
Chr.	Chromosome 2 (mouse)
Band	2 C1.3|2 35.56 cM	Start	61,633,274 bp
Band	2 C1.3|2 35.56 cM	End	61,644,458 bp
RNA expression pattern
Bgee	Human / Mouse (ortholog); Top expressed in: ganglionic eminence; Brodmann area 10; frontal pole; Brodmann area 9; right frontal lobe; cingulate gyrus; anterior cingulate cortex; postcentral gyrus; superior frontal gyrus; testicle / Top expressed in: cingulate gyrus; perirhinal cortex; piriform cortex; primary motor cortex; entorhinal cortex; visual cortex; primary visual cortex; superior frontal gyrus; prefrontal cortex; CA3 field; More reference expression data
BioGPS	n/a
Gene ontology
Molecular function	DNA-binding transcription factor activity; DNA binding; RNA polymerase II cis-regulatory region sequence-specific DNA binding; DNA-binding transcription factor activity, RNA polymerase II-specific; protein kinase binding; protein binding; identical protein binding
Cellular component	nucleus
Biological process	commitment of neuronal cell to specific neuron type in forebrain; regulation of gene expression; regulation of axon guidance; brain development; hindbrain development; regulation of transcription, DNA-templated; amygdala development; regulation of neuron projection development; transcription, DNA-templated; specification of animal organ identity; positive regulation of transcription by RNA polymerase II; conditioned taste aversion; neuron differentiation; cerebral cortex development
Sources:Amigo / QuickGO
Orthologs
Databases	NCBI: entry; OMA: entry
Species	Human	Mouse
Entrez	10716	21375
Ensembl	ENSG00000136535	ENSMUSG00000035033
UniProt	Q16650	Q64336
RefSeq (mRNA)	NM_006593	NM_009322
RefSeq (protein)	NP_006584	NP_033348
Location (UCSC)	Chr 2: 161.42 – 161.43 Mb	Chr 2: 61.63 – 61.64 Mb
PubMed search
- Wikidata
View/Edit Human	View/Edit Mouse

T-box, brain, 1 is a transcription factor protein important in vertebrate embryo development. It is encoded by the TBR1 gene. This gene is also known by several other names: T-Brain 1, TBR-1, TES-56, and MGC141978. TBR1 is a member of the TBR1 subfamily of T-box family transcription factors, which share a common DNA-binding domain. Other members of the TBR1 subfamily include EOMES and TBX21. TBR1 is involved in the differentiation and migration of neurons and is required for normal brain development. TBR1 interacts with various genes and proteins in order to regulate cortical development, specifically within layer VI of the developing six-layered human cortex. Studies show that TBR1 may play a role in major neurological diseases such as Alzheimer's disease (AD), Parkinson's disease (PD) and autism spectrum disorder (ASD).

== Discovery ==
TBR1 was identified in 1995 by the Nina Ireland Laboratory of Developmental Neurobiology Center at the University of California, San Francisco. The gene, initially named TES-56, was found to be largely expressed in the telencephalic vesicles of the developing forebrain of mice. The protein product of TES-56 was discovered to be homologous to the Brachyury protein, a T-box transcription factor, which plays a role in establishing symmetry during embryonic development. Thus, due to its relation to T-box genes (such as Tbx-1, Tbx-2, Tbx-3), TES-56 was renamed TBR1.

== Human TBR1 gene and encoded protein ==
The human TBR1 gene is located on the q arm of the positive strand of chromosome 2. It is 8,954 base pairs in length. TBR1 is one of the three genes that make up the TBR1 subfamily of T-box genes. The two other genes that form the TBR1 subfamily are EOMES (also known as TBR2) and TBX21 (also known as T-BET). TBR1 is also known as T-box Brain Protein, T-Brain 1, and TES-56. The encoded protein consists of 682 amino acid residues and has a predicted molecular weight of 74,053 Da. It is composed of 6 exons.

== Functions ==
Tbr1 is a protein, called a transcription factor, that binds to DNA and regulates the transcription of genes into mRNA. It is expressed in postmitotic projection neurons and is critical for normal brain development. Tbr1 has been shown to be expressed in the developing olfactory bulb. Tbr1 has also been observed in the developing cerebral cortex.

Tbr1 has several functions. These include involvement in the developmental process, brain development, neuronal differentiation, axon guidance, and regulation of neurons in the developing neocortex.

=== Neuronal differentiation ===
Tbr1, along with Pax6 and Tbr2, has a role in glutamatergic projection neuron differentiation. Glutamatergic neurons make and release in an activity-dependent manner the excitatory neurotransmitter glutamate as opposed to the inhibitory neurotransmitter GABA. The transition from radial glial cells to postmitotic projection neurons occurs in three steps, each associated with one of the aforementioned transcription factors. The first starts out with the expression of Pax6 in radial glial cells found primarily at the ventricular surface. In the next step, Pax6 is downregulated and Tbr2 is expressed as the cell differentiates into an intermediate progenitor cell. Likewise, in the final step, Tbr2 is extremely downregulated to undetectable levels as Tbr1 signals the transition into a postmitotic projection neuron.

=== Modulation of NMDAR ===
In cultured hippocampal neurons, Tbr1 and calcium/calmodulin-dependent serine kinase (CASK) interact with CASK-interacting nucleosome assembly protein (CINAP) to modulate the expression of N-methyl-D-aspartic acid receptor subunit 2b (NR2b) by acting on its promoter region. Tbr1 is a transcriptional regulator of NR1, an essential subunit of NMDA receptors.

=== Axon guidance ===
Cells that stop dividing (post-mitotic) and differentiate into neurons early in cortical development are important in laying the groundwork on which other developing neurons can be guided to their proper destination. Tbr1 aids in neuronal migration in the early development of the cerebral cortex. It is largely expressed in post-mitotic neurons of the preplate, which forms a foundation upon which neurons are able to grow and move. As a transcription factor, Tbr1 modulates the expression of RELN, which encodes the Reln protein that forms part of the extracellular matrix of cells. Thus, through regulation of Reln expression, Tbr1 regulates the formation of the matrix through which neurons migrate. Without Tbr1, neurons fail to migrate properly.

== Tissue and cellular distribution ==
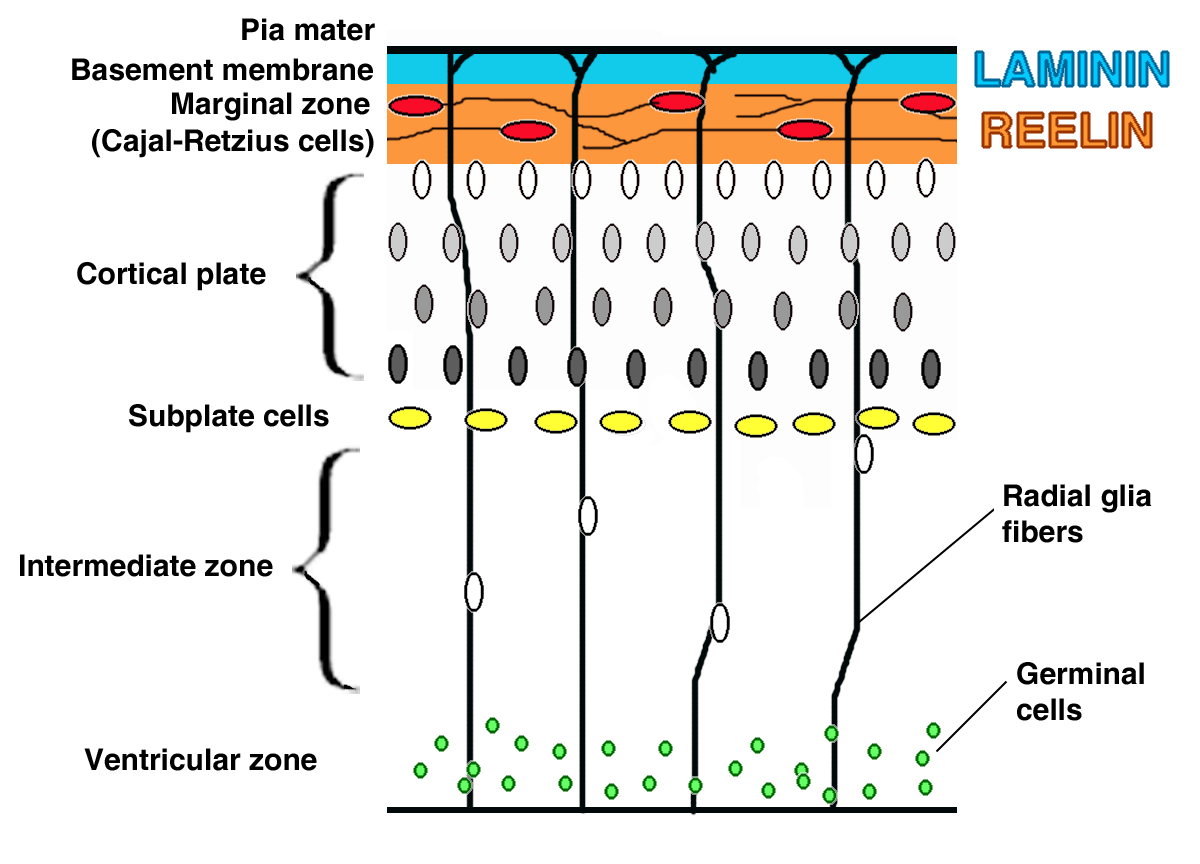
Corticogenesis in wild-type mice. Similar neuronal migration occurs in humans in the development of the six-layered cerebral cortex.

Being a transcription factor, a protein that binds to specific DNA sites and thereby regulates the activity of specific genes, Tbr1 is localized in the nucleus where the cell's DNA is located. Tbr1 is expressed in glutamergic neurons rather than GABAergic neurons.

Tbr1 is expressed mainly in early-born postmitotic neurons of the developing cerebral cortex—in particular, the preplate and layer VI neurons. The preplate forms the architectural network of neurons that help developing neurons migrate. Successive migrations of neurons divide the preplate such that its inner cells form the cortical plate while its outer cells form the marginal zone. The cortical plate and the marginal zone eventually develop into six cortical layers, known as the neocortex, present in the mature cerebral cortex. These layers are numbered I-VI with layer VI being the deepest and forming first, while the remaining layers grow outward from it (from V to I). Layers II-VI develop from the cortical plate and layer I forms from the marginal zone. The subplate, intermediate zone, subventricular zone, and ventricular zone are found progressively deeper to these developing cortical layers. High expression of Tbr1 is seen in the marginal zone, cortical plate, and subplate of the developing cortex whereas little expression is seen in the subventricular zone. No Tbr1 expression has been observed in the ventricular zone.

Other regions of Tbr1 expression are: the olfactory bulbs and olfactory nuclei, the lateral hypothalamus region, the entopeduncular nucleus, the eminentia thalami.

== Non-human orthologs ==
Orthologs of the human TBR1 gene have been identified in chimpanzee, dog, cow, rat, mouse, and zebrafish.

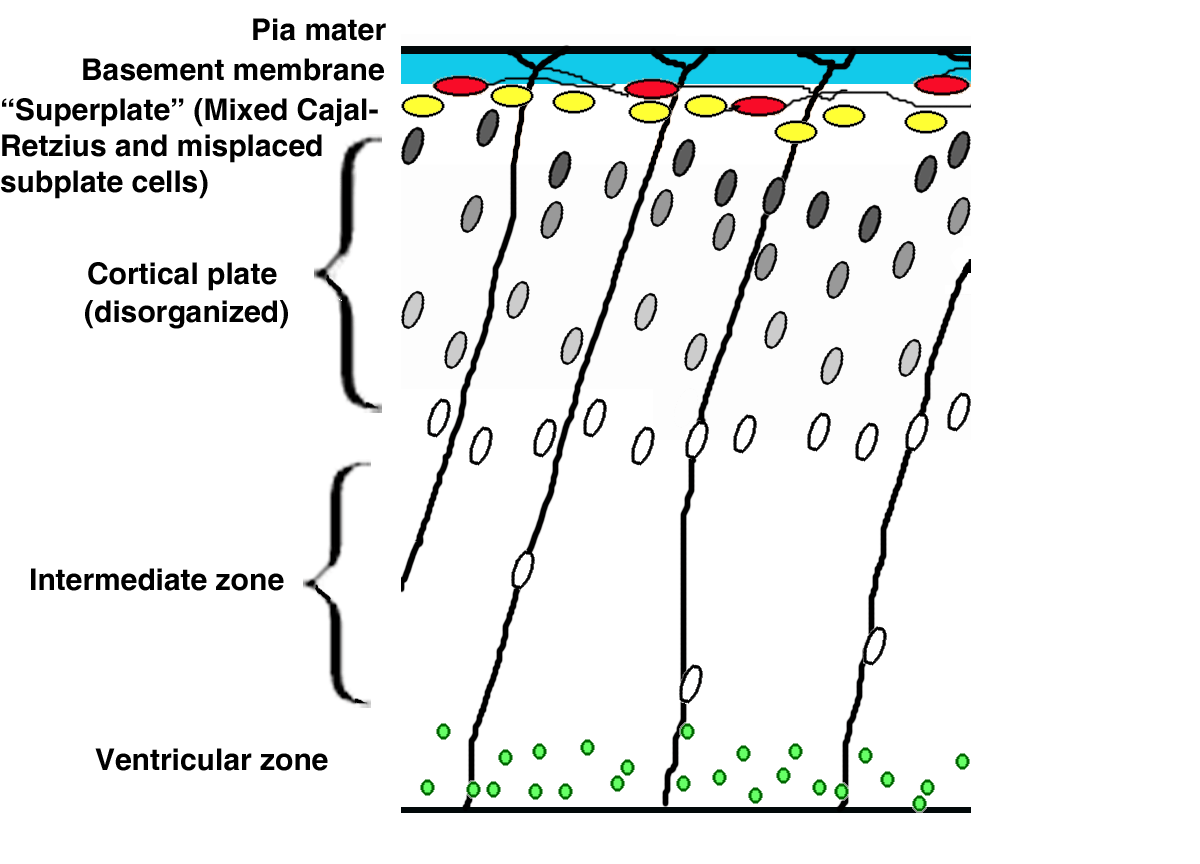
Corticogenesis in reeler mutant mice. Tbr-1 mutation results in similar abnormalities in cortical migration through reduction of Reelin expression.

=== Mice ===
In mice, TBR1 has been found to function in development of the brain, eye, immune system, mesoderm, and placenta. It is also involved in glutamatergic neuronal differentiation in the developing mouse brain. It was discovered that Tbr-1 is expressed by postmitotic cortical neurons in mice and in humans. One target gene of TBR1 in the mouse brain is RELN or Reelin. Tbr-1 mutant mice have been found to have reduced RELN expression, resulting in improper neuronal migration, particularly in Cajal-Retzius cells of the marginal zone.

Other studies in mice have found that TBR1 is a repressor or Fezf2. It has also been found to negatively regulate corticospinal tract formation.

=== Zebrafish ===
Studies in the zebrafish Danio rerio show that TBR1 is highly conserved across species. TBR1 cDNA clones from zebrafish were acquired by screening a zebrafish embryo using a phosphorus labeled probe. The TBR1 found in zebrafish (zf-TBR1) has 83-97% amino acid identity to orthologs in humans (hu-TBR1), xenopus (x-EOMES), and mice (mu-TBR1). The zebrafish TBR1 is only expressed in the forebrain, not in other regions of the zebrafish embryo.

=== Lancelets ===
The evolution of TBR1 has been studied in amphioxi, also known as lancelets. A T-box-containing cDNA was isolated in the lancelet Branchiostoma belcheri and found to possess a T-domain orthologous to that of the T-Brain subfamily of T-box genes, specifically TBR1. However, lancelets lack a true brain and no TBR1 transcripts were found in the neural tissue of the lancelet. This suggests that the neuronal role of TBR1 evolved in vertebrates after the lancelet lineage had already diverged from that of vertebrates.

== Gene regulation ==
TBR1 both positively and negatively regulates gene expression in postmitotic neurons.

=== Genes regulated by TBR1 ===
Fezf2 is a gene that is regulated by TBR1. Fezf2 expression is observed in layer V of the cerebral cortex. The cerebral cortex is constructed in six layers. Fezf2 expression is restricted to layer V for proper development and migration of neurons of the corticospinal tract, which is derived from layer V neurons and is involved in voluntary muscular control. Recent studies show that TBR1, expressed in layer VI, binds directly to the Fezf2 gene, preventing Fezf2 expression in layer VI. In this manner, TBR1 acts as a transcription repressor of Fezf2. Mutation of TBR1 results in Fezf2 expression in layer VI and malformation of the corticospinal tract. Abnormal activation of TBR1 in layer V eliminates corticospinal tract formation.

Bhlhb5 is a gene marker in the mouse brain, which is involved in differentiation of caudal identity in layer V neurons of the developing cortex, and is regulated by TBR1. It is expressed at high levels in caudal regions, but is not generally observed in the frontal cortex. Tbr1 is expressed at very high levels in the frontal cortex and very lower levels in the caudal regions. Using tbr1 null mutants, it was found that Bhlhb5 is up-regulated in the absence of TBR1. This up-regulation of Bhlhb5 led to the conclusion that tbr1 suppresses caudal identity while promoting frontal identity.

The gene Auts2 is also regulated by TBR1. The autism susceptibility candidate 2 gene (Auts2) is a marker of frontal identity in the developing cortex and has been linked to mental retardation and autism. Auts2 is a target of the transcription factor, TBR1, in the neocortex. TBR1 is involved in both the binding and activation of the Auts2 gene.

=== Co-regulatory proteins ===
Tbr1 forms a complex with CASK and regulates gene expression in cortical development. Tbr1 binds to the guanylate kinase (GK) domain of CASK. It was determined that the C-terminal domain of Tbr1 in crucial and solely capable of this process. Through luciferase reporter assays of neurons in the hippocampus, it was found that increased Tbr1/CASK complex expression results in enhanced promoter activity in genes downstream of TBR1 such as NMDAR subunit 2b (NMDAR2b), glycine transporter, interleukin-7 receptor (IL-7R) and OX-2 genes. NMDAR2b experienced the greatest change in activity.

Tbr1 and CASK also play an important role in activation of the RELN gene. One study suggests that CASK acts as a coactivator of TBR1, interacting with CINAP (CASK-interacting nucleosome assembly protein) to form a complex with Tbr1. The Tbr1/CASK/CINAP complex regulates expression of NMDAR2b and RELN, which both play important roles in long-term potentiation.

Sox5 is another co-regulatory protein of Tbr1. Sox5 is a marker of layer VI neurons in the neocortex. It aids in the suppression of layer V neuron identity within layer VI cortical neurons through suppression of Fezf2. TBR1 is involved in the downstream regulation of Sox5. Sox5 expression was reduced in Tbr1 null mutants. It has been found that Sox5 interacts with Tbr1 to regulate Fezf2 transcription in layer VI cortical neurons.

=== Transcription factors that regulate the expression of Tbr1 ===
Studies suggest that the Af9 protein acts as a repressor of Tbr1 in the upper layers of the six-layer developing cerebral cortex, thereby confining Tbr1 to the lower cortical layers (preplate, subplate, layer VI). This process is regulated through interaction of Af9 with the methyltransferase DOT1L, which methylates histone H3 lysine 79 (H3K79). Af9 association with DOT1L enhances methylation of H3K79 at the TBR1 transcription start site, thereby interfering with RNA polymerase II (RNAPolII) activity and reducing TBR1 expression. Mutants of Af9 experience increased dimethylation of H3K79 and increased TBR1 expression.

== Clinical significance ==
TBR1 has been implicated in alterations in the brain that may lead to Alzheimer's disease (AD) and Parkinson's disease (PD). TBR1 expressing mice showed that cholinergic neurons of the basal forebrain (ChBF), the degeneration of which are involved in the development of AD and PD, migrate from the ventral pallium to the subpallium. This was confirmed using TBR1 null mice. In the future, the researchers plan to explore the role of amyloid precursor protein (APP) in neuronal migration and linkage to these diseases.

Reduced function of NMDA receptors play a role in schizophrenia. This diminished function of NMDA receptor may be correlated with the reduced expression of the NMDA receptor 2B subunit (NR2b), which has also been linked to schizophrenia. TBR1, in complex with the protein, CINAP, is responsible for regulating transcription of the NR2b gene. It was hypothesized in one 2010 study that reduced TBR1 and CINAP expression may be responsible for the reduced expression of the NR2b subunit observed in brains of postmortem schizophrenics. However, TBR1 and CINAP expression were not significantly reduced in the postmortem brains, suggesting that synthesis and processing of NR2b via TBR1 is not responsible for reduced NR2b expression in schizophrenics.

TBR1 expression has been shown to be downregulated by embryonic exposure to cocaine. Prenatal cocaine exposure in a mouse model caused a decrease in both GABA neuron migration from the basal to the dorsal forebrain and radial neuron migration in the dorsal forebrain. This exposure also decreased TBR1 and TBR2 expression. However, further research showed that cocaine exposure only delayed TBR1 expression and did not cause permanent downregulation. Therefore, in models of prenatal cocaine exposure both migration and maturation of these progenitor cells is delayed.

TBR1 is also used in immunohistochemical techniques in neurological research. It has been used to identify layer VI developing cortical neurons as well as the prethalamic eminence, pallium, and dorsal forebrain. The presence of TBR1 in stem cells responding to telencephalon injury implicates the normal function of these cells in this region of the brain.

Mutations of this gene have also been reported in the tissues of medulloblastoma.

Variations in this gene as well as whole gene deletions have been known to cause a disorder involving Autism Spectrum Disorder, Intellectual Disability, Epilepsy with skeletal, nervous system and brain abnormalities. It is extremely rare and as of July 2020, 40 cases have been recorded worldwide, it was first described in 2014. It has Autosomal Dominant presentation and are typically de novo but rare inherited variants have been reported.

== See also ==
- T-box family
- TBR2
- TBX21
