= Cleidocranial dysostosis =

Birth defect of the collarbones, skull, and teeth

- Other names: Cleidocranial dysplasia, Marie–Sainton syndrome, mutational dysostosis
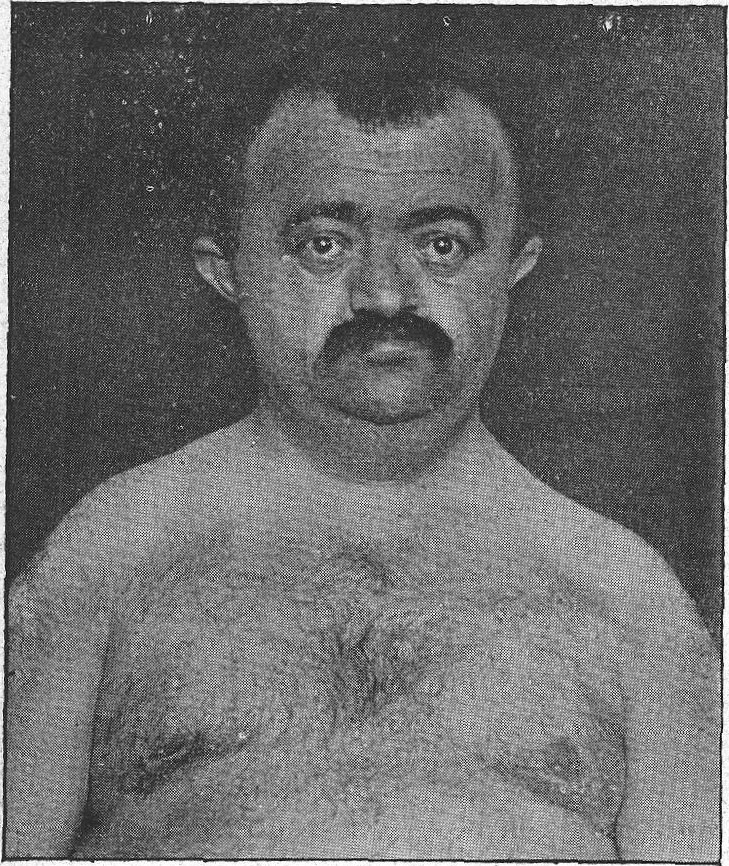
- Adult male patient described by Marie and Sainton, 1898
- Specialty: Medical genetics
- Symptoms: Missing collarbone, prominent forehead, flat nose, shorter
- Usual onset: Present at birth
- Causes: Genetic (RUNX2 gene)
- Diagnostic method: Based on symptoms and X-rays, confirmed by genetic testing
- Differential diagnosis: Mandibuloacral dysplasia, pyknodysostosis, osteogenesis imperfecta, Hajdu-Cheney syndrome
- Treatment: Supportive care
- Prognosis: Normal life expectancy
- Frequency: One per million people

Cleidocranial dysostosis (CCD), also called cleidocranial dysplasia, is a birth defect that mostly affects the bones and teeth. The collarbones are typically either poorly developed or absent, which allows the shoulders to be brought close together. The front of the skull often does not close until later, and those affected are often shorter than average. Other symptoms may include a prominent forehead, wide-set eyes, abnormal teeth, and a flat nose. Symptoms vary among people; however, cognitive function is typically unaffected.

The condition is either inherited or occurs as a new mutation. It is inherited in an autosomal dominant manner. It is due to a defect in the RUNX2 gene which is involved in bone formation. Diagnosis is suspected based on symptoms and X-rays with confirmation by genetic testing. Other conditions that can produce similar symptoms include mandibuloacral dysplasia, pyknodysostosis, osteogenesis imperfecta, and Hajdu–Cheney syndrome.

Treatment includes supportive measures such as a device to protect the skull and dental care. Surgery may be performed to fix certain bone abnormalities. Life expectancy is generally normal.

It affects about one person per million. Males and females are equally commonly affected. Modern descriptions of the condition date to at least 1896. The term is from cleido 'collarbone', cranial from Greek κρανίο 'skull', and dysostosis 'formation of abnormal bone'.

== Signs and symptoms ==
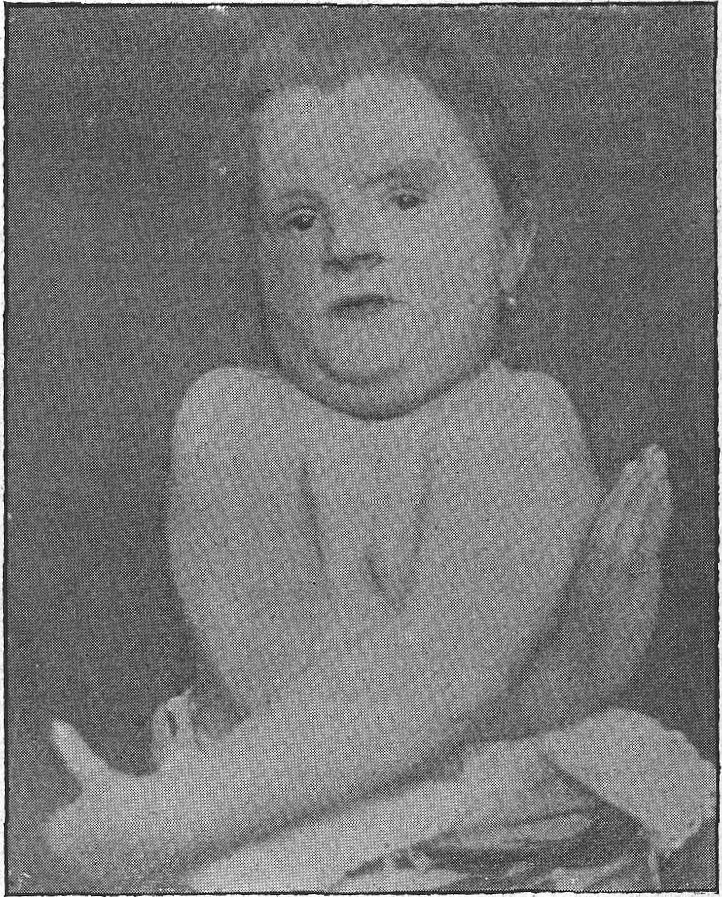
Female child patient described by Marie and Sainton, 1898, showing absence of clavicles

Cleidocranial dysostosis is a general skeletal condition, so named from the collarbone (cleido-) and cranium deformities that people with it often have.

People with the condition usually present with a painless swelling in the area of the clavicles at 2 to 3 years of age. Common features are:

- Clavicles (collarbones) can be partly missing, leaving only the medial part of the bone. In 10% of cases, they are completely missing. If the collarbones are completely missing or reduced to small vestiges, this allows hypermobility of the shoulders, including the ability to touch the shoulders together in front of the chest. The defect is bilateral 80% of the time. Partial collarbones may cause nerve damage symptoms and therefore have to be removed by surgery.
- The mandible is prognathic due to hypoplasia of maxilla (micrognathism) and other facial bones.
- A soft spot or larger soft area in the top of the head where the fontanelle failed to close, or the fontanelle closes late
- Bones and joints are underdeveloped. People with the condition are shorter, and their frames are smaller than those of their siblings who do not have the condition.
- The permanent teeth include supernumerary teeth. Unless these supernumeraries are removed, they will crowd the adult teeth in what may already be an underdeveloped jaw. If so, the supernumeraries will probably need to be removed to make space for the adult teeth. Up to 13 supernumerary teeth have been observed. Teeth may also be displaced. Cementum formation may be deficient.
- Failure of eruption of permanent teeth
- Bossing (bulging) of the forehead
- Open skull sutures, large fontanelles
- Hypertelorism
- Delayed ossification of bones forming symphysis pubis, producing a widened symphysis
- Coxa vara can occur, limiting abduction and causing Trendelenburg gait
- Short middle fifth phalanges, sometimes causing short and wide fingers
- Vertebral abnormalities
- On rare occasions, brachial plexus irritation can occur
- Scoliosis, spina bifida and syringomyelia have also been described
- Wide nasal bridge
- Crooked teeth
- Increased risk of flat foot and knee deformities
- High risk of hearing loss caused by infections
- Decreased bone density, resulting in increased risk of fractures

Other features are: parietal bossing, basilar invagination (atlantoaxial impaction), persistent metopic suture, abnormal ear structures with hearing loss, supernumerary ribs, hemivertebrae with spondylosis, small and high scapulae, hypoplasia of illiac bones, absence of the pubic bone, short / absent fibular bones, short / absent radial bones, hypoplastic terminal phalanges.

== Genetics ==
CCD is usually autosomal dominant, but in some cases its cause is not known. The main mechanism is thought to involve haploinsufficiency caused by mutations in CBFA1 (also known as Runx2), a gene located on the short arm of chromosome 6 (6p21), which encodes a transcription factor required for the differentiation of stem cells into osteoblasts. This results in delayed ossification of midline structures of the body and ensuing defects in intramembranous and endochondral bone formation.

== Diagnosis ==
Different features of the dysostosis are significant. Radiological imaging helps confirm the diagnosis. During gestation (pregnancy), clavicular size can be calculated using available nomograms. Wormian bones can sometimes be observed in the skull.

Diagnosis of CCD spectrum disorder is established in an individual with typical clinical and radiographic findings and/or by the identification of a heterozygous pathogenic variant in RUNX2 (CBFA1).

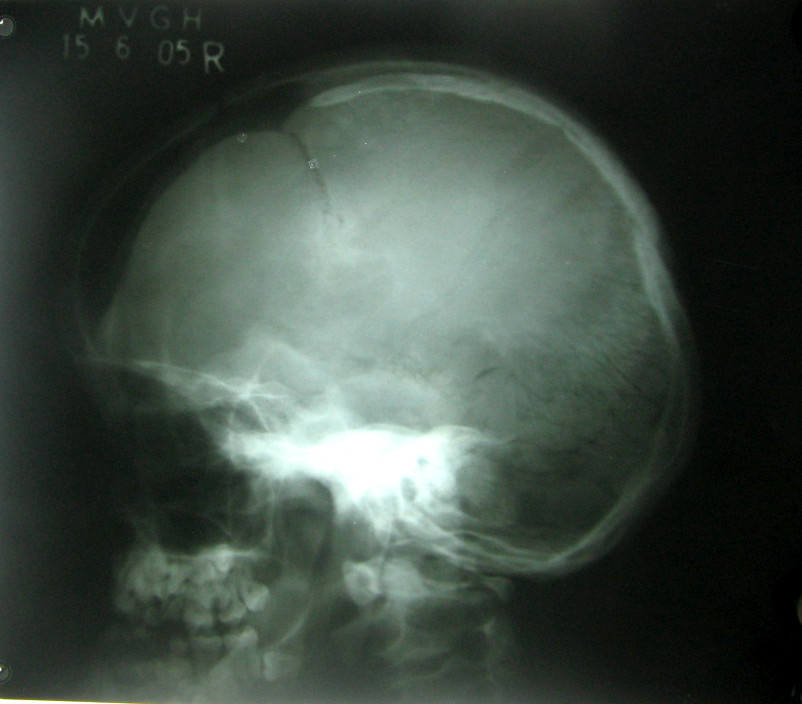
Lateral skull radiograph showing open skull sutures, large fontanelles, multiple wormian bones and underdeveloped paranasal sinuses

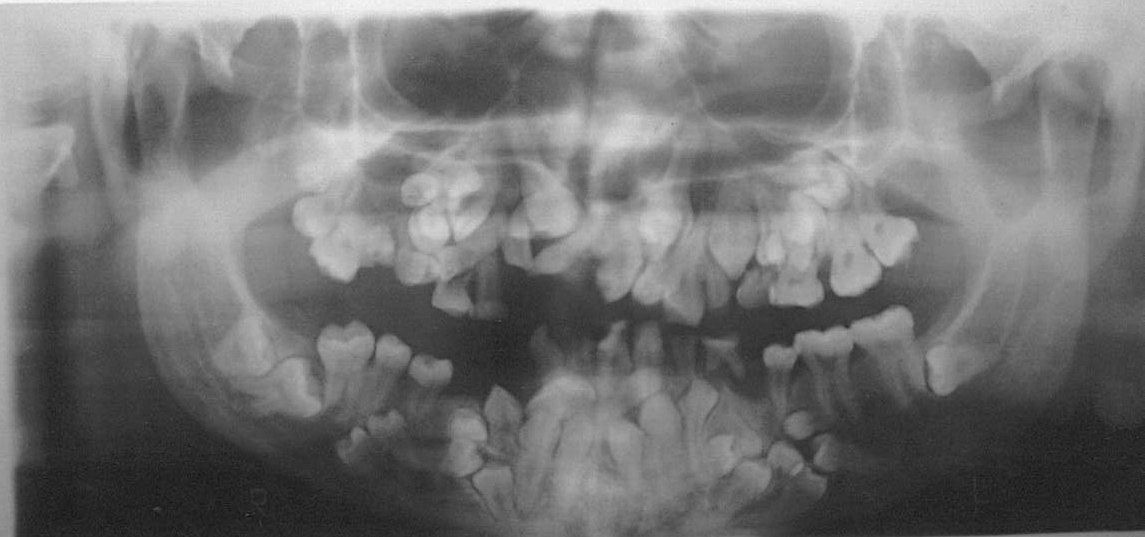
Panoramic view of the jaws showing multiple unerupted supernumerary teeth mimicking premolar, missing gonial angles and underdeveloped maxillary sinuses in cleidocranial dysplasia

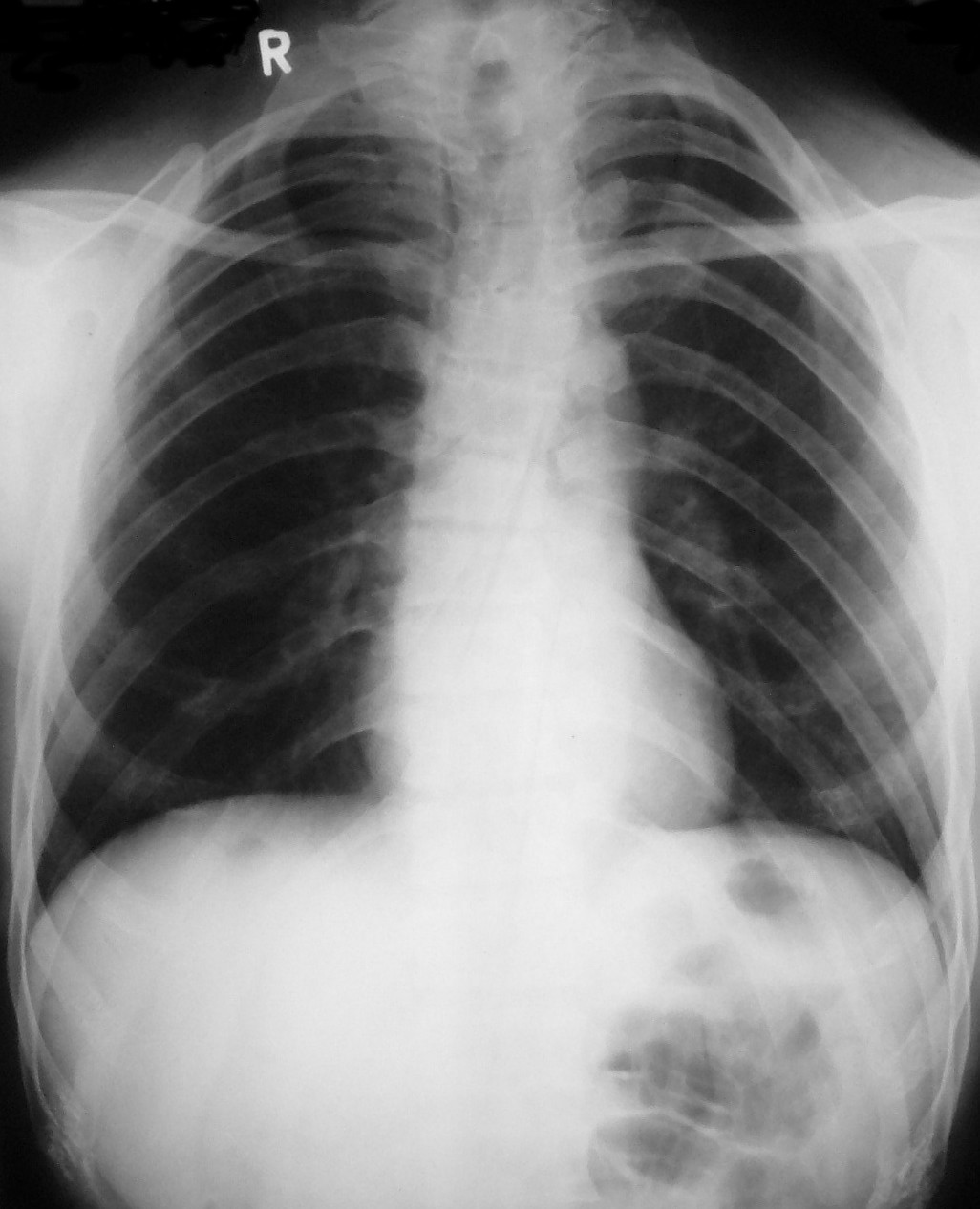
Poor development of the clavicles and a bell-shaped rib cage in a person with CCD

== Treatment ==
Around 5 years of age, surgical correction may be necessary to prevent any worsening of the deformity. If the mother has dysplasia, caesarian delivery may be necessary. Craniofacial surgery may be necessary to correct skull defects. Coxa vara is treated by corrective femoral osteotomies. If there is brachial plexus irritation with pain and numbness, excision of the clavicular fragments can be performed to decompress it.

== Prognosis ==
Several studies have reported that life expectancy appears to be normal for people with CCD.

== Epidemiology ==
Cleidocranial dysostosis affects about one per million people.

== Notable people ==
In 1987, a young girl named Jessica McClure fell down a narrow well pipe in her family's Texas property. Ron Short, a roofing contractor who was born without collarbones because of cleidocranial dysostosis and thus could collapse his shoulders to work in cramped corners, arrived at the site and offered to go down the shaft. The rescuers did not end up using him, though McClure was successfully recovered from the well.

Actor Gaten Matarazzo was born with cleidocranial dysplasia, which is incorporated into his character Dustin Henderson's storyline on Stranger Things.

Sibling actress-singers Milly and Abi Shapiro were born with cleidocranial dysplasia, a trait they share with their mother.
