= AI-10-49 =

Chemical compound

Identifiers
- IUPAC name: 2,2'-(5,5'-((Oxybis(ethane-2,1-diyl))bis(oxy))bis(pyridine-5,2-diyl))bis(5-(trifluoromethoxy)-1H-benzo[d]imidazole)
- CAS Number: 1256094-72-0
- ChemSpider: 35099469
- UNII: UBW5XL5U9W

Chemical and physical data
- Formula: C_{30}H_{22}F_{6}N_{6}O_{5}
- Molar mass: 660.533 g·mol^{−1}
- 3D model (JSmol): Interactive image
- SMILES: FC(F)(F)OC1=CC2=C(C=C1)NC(C(C=C3)=NC=C3OCCOCCOC(C=C4)=CN=C4C5=NC6=CC(OC(F)(F)F)=CC=C6N5)=N2
- InChI: InChI=1S/C30H22F6N6O5/c31-29(32,33)46-17-1-5-21-25(13-17)41-27(39-21)23-7-3-19(15-37-23)44-11-9-43-10-12-45-20-4-8-24(38-16-20)28-40-22-6-2-18(14-26(22)42-28)47-30(34,35)36/h1-8,13-16H,9-12H2,(H,39,41)(H,40,42); Key:WJBSSBFGPKTMQQ-UHFFFAOYSA-N

AI-10-49 is a small molecule inhibitor of leukemic oncoprotein CBFβ-SMHHC developed by the laboratory of John Bushweller (University of Virginia) with efficacy demonstrated by the laboratories of Lucio H. Castilla (University of Massachusetts Medical School) and Monica Guzman (Cornell University). AI-10-49 allosterically binds to CBFβ-SMMHC and disrupts protein-protein interaction between CBFβ-SMMHC and tumor suppressor RUNX1. This inhibitor is under development as an anti-leukemic drug.

== Core binding factors ==
Core-binding factor (CBF) is a heterodimeric transcription factor composed by the CBFβ and RUNX subunits (the latter is encoded by RUNX1, RUNX2, or RUNX3 genes). CBF plays critical roles in most hematopoietic lineages, regulating gene expression of a variety of genes associated with cell cycle, differentiation, signaling and adhesion. In hematopoiesis, CBF regulates progenitor cell fate decisions and differentiation at multiple levels. The function of CBF is essential for the emergence of embryonic hematopoietic stem cells (HSCs) and establishment of definitive hematopoiesis at midgestation. Similarly, in adult hematopoiesis, CBF regulates the frequency and differentiation of HSCs, lymphoid and myeloid progenitors, establishing CBF as a master regulator of hematopoietic homeostasis.

== Core binding factors and leukemia ==
CBF members are frequent targets of mutations and rearrangements in human leukemia. Point-mutations in RUNX1 gene have been reported in patients with familial platelet disorder, myeloid dysplastic syndrome, and chronic myelomonocytic leukemia. In addition, RUNX1 mutations have also been reported in Acute myeloid leukemia (AML). The RUNX1 and CBFB genes are targets of chromosome rearrangements that create oncogenic fusion genes in leukemia. The chromosome translocation t(12;21) (p13.1;q22) causes the fusion of the ETS variant 6 (ETV6) and RUNX1 genes results in ETV6-RUNX1 gene fusion and is the most common genetic aberration in childhood acute lymphoblastic leukemia (ALL). The "core binding factor AML" (CBF AML) [WHO classification] is the most common group of AML, including groups with the chromosome rearrangements inv(16)(p13q22) and t(8;21)(q22;q22). The chromosome translocation t(8;21)(q22;q22) creates the RUNX1-ETO fusion gene, which is expressed in FAB subtype M2 AML samples. The pericentric chromosome inversion inv(16)(p13q22) creates the CBFB-MYH11 fusion gene, which encodes the CBFβ-SMMHC fusion protein.

== Inv(16) leukemia ==
The inv(16) is present in all M4Eo subtype AML, representing one of the most common change in AML, and accounting for ≈12% of de novo human AML. Studies by various laboratories have established that CBFβ-SMMHC acts as a dominant repressor of CBF function in vivo and specifically blocks lymphoid and myeloid lineage differentiation.

Treatment of AML varies based on the prognosis and mutations identified in the patient sample. Current treatment for inv(16) AML uses chemotherapy drugs, such as doxorubicin and cytarabine, with an estimated 5-year overall survival of 60% in young patients and only 20% in the elderly.

== Discovery ==
CBFβ-SMMHC outcompetes CBFβ for binding to RUNX1 by direct protein-protein interaction.

Using a fluorescence resonance energy transfer (FRET) based assay, AI-4-57 was discovered as the lead compound which can inhibit CBFβ-SMHHC –RUNX1 protein-protein interaction. To get good in vivo pharmacokinetics, selectivity and potency AI-10-49 was developed which has a seven atom polyethylene glycol-based linker and a trifluoromethoxy substitution. This molecule releases RUNX1 from CBFβ-SMHHC specifically and restores the RUNX1 transcriptional program in inv(16) positive human leukemic cells. Viability assays showed AI-10-49 has an IC50 of 0.6μM. Pharmacokinetic studies showed that AI-10-49 has half-life of 380 minutes in mouse plasma. AI-10-49 prolonged the survival of mice transplanted with CBFβ-SMHHC leukemic cells without any signs of toxicity. AI-10-49 reduced viability and colony forming ability of human primary inv(16) leukemic blast cells, without affecting normal human bone marrow cells as wells non- inv(16) primary human leukemic blast cells. Overall, these findings validate inhibition of RUNX1- CBFβ-SMMHC protein-protein interaction as a novel therapeutic avenue for leukemia with inv(16) and AI-10-49 as a specific inhibitor of CBFβ-SMHHC oncoprotein. The discovery of AI-10-49 provides additional evidence that transcription factor drivers of cancer can be directly targeted. AI-10-49 belongs to a select group of protein-protein interaction inhibitors that has been shown to have specific and potent efficiency without toxicity in cancer therapy.

== Mechanism of action of AI-10-49 ==
The mechanism of action of AI-10-49 was recently elucidated by the Castilla laboratory at University of Massachusetts Medical School. Gene Set Enrichment Analysis of RNA-seq data from inv(16) AML cells treated with AI-10-49 identified the deregulation of a MYC signature, including cell cycle, ribosome biogenesis and metabolism. MYC shRNA knockdown induced apoptosis of inv(16) AML cells, and MYC overexpression partially rescued AI-10-49 induced apoptosis. Furthermore, mouse leukemia cells transduced with Myc shRNAs showed significant delay in leukemic latency upon transplantation, validating the requirement of MYC in inv(16) AML maintenance in vivo. Pharmacologic inhibition of MYC activity, using a combined treatment with AI-10-49 and the BET-family bromodomain inhibitor JQ1, revealed a strong synergy in inv(16) AML cells and a significant delay in leukemia latency in mice. ChIP-seq and ATAC-seq analysis revealed that inhibition of the CBFβ-SMHHC–RUNX1 protein–protein interaction by AI-10-49 results in increased RUNX1 occupancy at three MYC distal enhancers downstream from MYC transcription start site. Deletion of the RUNX1 binding site in these enhancers by genome editing (CRISPR/Cas9) reduced MYC transcript levels and the viability of inv(16) AML cells, indicating that each one of these enhancers plays a critical role in regulating MYC levels and sustaining the survival of inv(16) AML cells. Analysis of enhancer-promoter interactions by chromosome conformation capture carbon copy (5C) in inv(16) AML cells revealed that the three enhancers are physically connected with each other and to the MYC promoter. Analysis of chromatin immunoprecipitation revealed that AI-10-49 treatment results in the displacement of the SWI/SNF complex component BRG1 and RUNX1 mediated recruitment of polycomb-repressive complex 1 (PRC1) component RING1B at the three MYC enhancers. Taken together, these results demonstrate that AI-10-49 treatment induces an acute release of RUNX1, increases RUNX1 occupancy at MYC enhancers, and disrupts enhancer chromatin dynamics which in turn induces apoptosis by repressing MYC. Furthermore, this study suggests that combined treatment of inv(16) AML with AI-10-49 and BET-family inhibitors may represent a promising targeted therapy.

== Protein-protein interaction inhibitors in cancer therapy ==
Targeting protein-protein interaction with small molecule is known to be extremely difficult due to the fact that binding regions consist of wide, shallow surfaces. There are few protein-protein interaction inhibitors with specific and non-toxic effect in various cancer types. The first and best characterized protein-protein interaction inhibitor in cancer therapy is Nutlin. Nutlin inhibits the interaction between HDM2 and tumour suppressor p53. After the discovery of Nutlin, more than 20 small molecule inhibitors have been developed by academic institutes and pharmaceutical companies of which 8 inhibitors are under Phase 1 clinical trials. Other examples for protein-protein interaction inhibitors include JQ1 (inhibits the interaction between acetylated histones and BRD4); 79-6 (inhibits BCL6 BTB domain dimerization); MI-463 and MI-503 (inhibit Menin-MLL interaction) and ABT-737 (inhibits BCL2L1-BCL2 interaction).
