= Eomesodermin =

Protein-coding gene in the species Homo sapiens

EOMES

Identifiers
- Aliases: EOMES, TBR2, Eomesodermin
- External IDs: OMIM: 604615; MGI: 1201683; GeneCards: EOMES

Gene location (Human)
Chr.	Chromosome 3 (human)
Band	3p24.1	Start	27,715,949 bp
Band	3p24.1	End	27,722,711 bp

Gene location (Mouse)
Chr.	Chromosome 9 (mouse)
Band	9 70.21 cM|9 F3	Start	118,307,280 bp
Band	9 70.21 cM|9 F3	End	118,315,200 bp
RNA expression pattern
Bgee	Human / Mouse (ortholog); Top expressed in: ganglionic eminence; ventricular zone; granulocyte; cerebellar vermis; cerebellar hemisphere; testicle; right hemisphere of cerebellum; lymph node; blood; spleen / Top expressed in: ventricular zone; olfactory bulb; epiblast; blastocyst; blastocyst; embryo; cerebellar vermis; mesoderm; blood; embryo; More reference expression data
BioGPS	n/a
Gene ontology
Molecular function	RNA polymerase II transcription regulatory region sequence-specific DNA binding; chromatin binding; sequence-specific DNA binding; DNA-binding transcription factor activity; DNA binding; DNA-binding transcription factor activity, RNA polymerase II-specific
Cellular component	nucleus; intracellular anatomical structure
Biological process	stem cell population maintenance; regulation of transcription by RNA polymerase II; positive regulation of transcription, DNA-templated; regulation of neurogenesis; gastrulation; trophectodermal cell differentiation; skeletal muscle cell differentiation; adaptive immune response; multicellular organism development; cell differentiation; blastocyst development; regulation of transcription, DNA-templated; cerebral cortex neuron differentiation; regulation of neuron differentiation; CD8-positive, alpha-beta T cell differentiation involved in immune response; transcription, DNA-templated; olfactory bulb development; endodermal cell fate specification; cerebral cortex regionalization; cardioblast differentiation; immune system process; positive regulation of cell differentiation; positive regulation of transcription by RNA polymerase II; brain development; regulation of gene expression; mesoderm formation; negative regulation of transcription by RNA polymerase II; mesodermal to mesenchymal transition involved in gastrulation; endoderm formation; cell differentiation involved in embryonic placenta development; negative regulation of DNA-binding transcription factor activity; neurogenesis; neuron differentiation; endoderm development; anatomical structure morphogenesis; mesendoderm development
Sources:Amigo / QuickGO
Orthologs
Databases	NCBI: entry; OMA: entry
Species	Human	Mouse
Entrez	8320	13813
Ensembl	ENSG00000163508	ENSMUSG00000032446
UniProt	O95936	O54839
RefSeq (mRNA)	NM_001278182; NM_001278183; NM_005442	NM_001164789; NM_010136
RefSeq (protein)	NP_001265111; NP_001265112; NP_005433	NP_001158261; NP_034266
Location (UCSC)	Chr 3: 27.72 – 27.72 Mb	Chr 9: 118.31 – 118.32 Mb
PubMed search
- Wikidata
View/Edit Human	View/Edit Mouse

Eomesodermin also known as T-box brain protein 2 (Tbr2) is a protein that in humans is encoded by the EOMES gene.

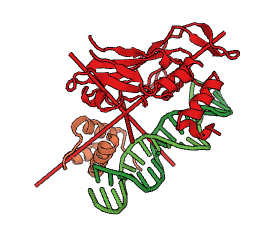
A representation of the T box DNA binding domain

The Eomesodermin/Tbr2 gene, EOMES, encodes a member of a conserved protein family that shares a common DNA-binding domain, the T-box. T-box genes encode transcription factors, which control gene expression, involved in the regulation of developmental processes. Eomesodermin/Tbr2 itself controls regulation of radial glia, as well as other related cells. Eomesodermin/Tbr2 has also been found to have a role in immune response, and there exists some loose evidence for its connections in other systems.

== Nervous system development ==
=== Neurogenesis ===
Eomesodermin/Tbr2 is expressed highly in the intermediate progenitor stage of the developing neuron. Neurons, the primary functional cells of the brain, are developed from radial glia cells. This process of cells developing into other types of cells is called differentiation. Radial glia are present in the ventricular zone of the brain, which are on the lateral walls of the lateral ventricles. Radial glia divide and migrate towards the surface of the brain, the cerebral cortex. During this migration, there are three stages of cellular development: radial glia, intermediate progenitors, and postmitotic projection neurons. Radial glia express Pax6, while intermediate progenitor cells express Eomesodermin/Tbr2, and postmitotic projection neurons express Tbr1. This process, known as neurogenesis, occurs mainly in the developing cortex before the organism has fully developed, and thus Eomesodermin/Tbr2 has been implicated in neurodevelopment.

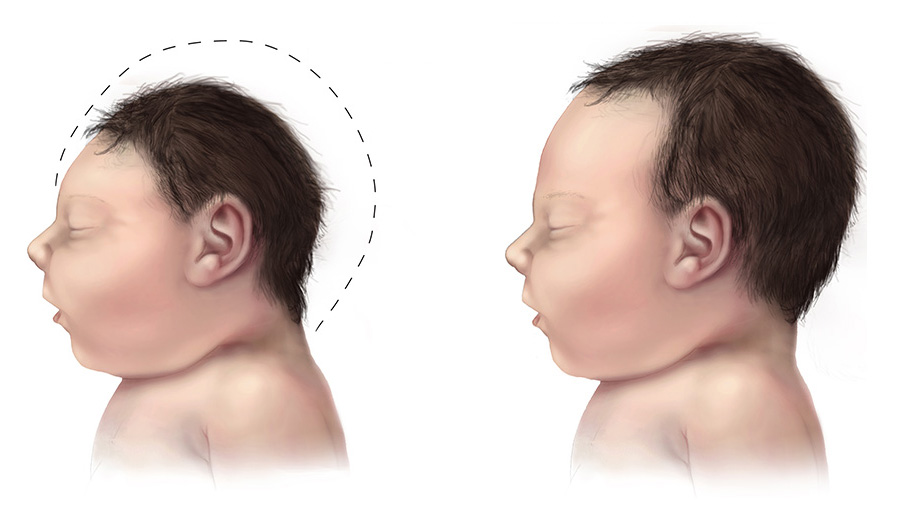
Microcephaly

Tbr2 has been observed in a transcription factor cascade to enable to development of glutamatergic neurons. Pax6, as expressed by radial glia cells, activates the transcription of Neurogenin-2 which then activates the generation of intermediate progenitor cells (IPC) expressing Tbr2. These cells are localized within the subventricular zone. The IPCs then undergo symmetric division to produce NeuroD expressing cells that can differentiate in TBR1 neurons. Similar mechanisms have been observed in both embryonic and adult neurogenesis.

Tbr2 inactivation has also been tied to deficiencies in cortical neurogenesis further suggesting the importance of the cascade in activating and maintaining neuron production. It has been found experimentally through knockout studies that mice lacking Eomesodermin/Tbr2 during early development have a reduced number of actively dividing cells, called proliferating cells, in the subventricular zone. This, may lead to the microcephaly (small head size due to improper brain development) seen in Eomesodermin/Tbr2 deficient mice. Eomesodermin/Tbr2 lacking mice have smaller upper cortical layers and a smaller sub ventricular zone in the brain, and have an absence of a mitral cell (neurons involved in the olfactory pathway) layer, with mitral cells instead being scattered about. Phenotypically, Eomesodermin/Tbr2 lacking mice show high anger levels and perform infanticide. Eomesodermin/Tbr2 lacking mice also seem to have problems with long axon connections. Axons are projections from neurons that connect with other cells in what is called a synapse and send neurotransmitters. In this way, they can communicate with other cells, and form the processing that allows are brains to function. Eomesodermin/Tbr2 lacking mice seem to lack fully formed commissural fibers, which connect the two hemispheres of the brain, and lack the corpus callosum, another region of the brain involved in hemisphere connections.

=== Role in adult development ===
There are locations within the brain that have been discovered to perform neurogenesis into adulthood, including the ventricular zone. The hippocampus, which is involved in memory formation, shows decreased neurogenesis when Eomesodermin/Tbr2 is removed. It was also found that Eomesodermin/Tbr2 functions by reducing amounts of Sox2, which is associated with radial glia. Another study found that mice without Eomesodermin/Tbr2 lacked long term memory formation, which may relate to Eomesodermin/Tbr2's effects on the hippocampus.

== Cardiac development ==
Early in development, Eomesodermin/Tbr2 controls early differentiation of the cardiac mesoderm. Lack of Eomesodermin/Tbr2 appears to be correlated with failure to differentiate into cardiomyocytes. Eomesodermin/Tbr2 controls the expression of cardiac specific genes Mesp1, Myl7, Myl2, Myocardin, Nkx2.5 and Mef2c.

== Immune response ==
Eomesodermin/Tbr2 is highly expressed in CD8+ T cells, but not CD4+ T cells. CD4+ T cells are the helper T cells which detect foreign particles in the body, and call CD8+ T cells to facilitate death of the foreign particles. Eomesodermin/Tbr2 was found to play a role in the anti cancer properties of CD8+ T cells. Lack of Eomesodermin/Tbr2, alongside T bet, another T box protein, caused CD8+ T cells to not penetrate tumors so they could perform their anti cancer duties. Eomesodermin/Tbr2 prevents CD8+ cells from differentiating into other types of T cells, but does not play a role in the production of CD8+ T cells itself.

== See also ==
- T-box family
- TBR1
