= Ro5-3335 =

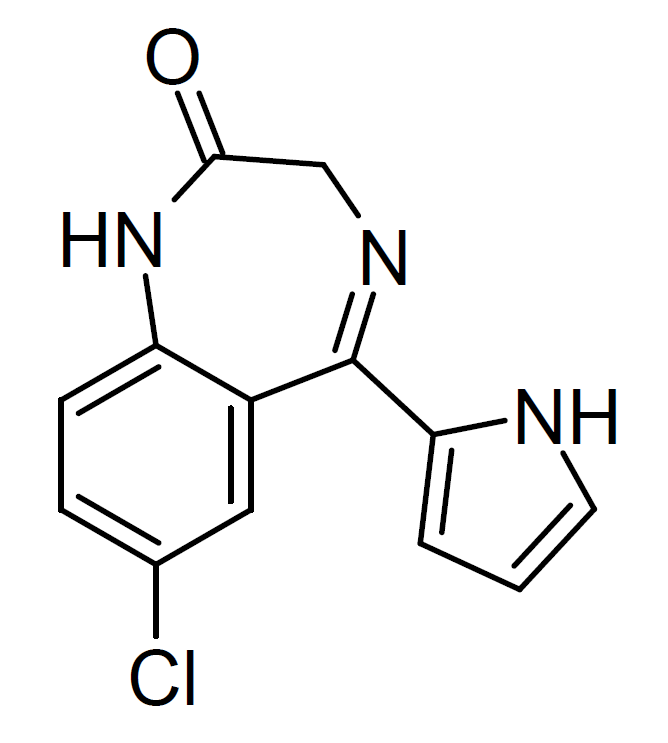

Identifiers
- IUPAC name: 7-chloro-5-(1H-pyrrol-2-yl)-1,3-dihydro-1,4-benzodiazepin-2-one
- CAS Number: 30195-30-3
- PubChem CID: 64983
- ChemSpider: 58508
- UNII: DLH4T68L7I
- ChEBI: CHEBI:131785
- ChEMBL: ChEMBL91609
- CompTox Dashboard (EPA): DTXSID20184270

Chemical and physical data
- Formula: C_{13}H_{10}ClN_{3}O
- Molar mass: 259.69 g·mol^{−1}
- 3D model (JSmol): Interactive image
- SMILES: C1C(=O)NC2=C(C=C(C=C2)Cl)C(=N1)C3=CC=CN3
- InChI: InChI=1S/C13H10ClN3O/c14-8-3-4-10-9(6-8)13(11-2-1-5-15-11)16-7-12(18)17-10/h1-6,15H,7H2,(H,17,18); Key:XWNMORIHKRROGW-UHFFFAOYSA-N

Ro5-3335 is an experimental drug from the benzodiazepine family which acts as a selective inhibitor of the protein Runt-related transcription factor 1 (RUNX1). Inhibition of this protein is useful in numerous medical applications, and Ro5-3335 has beneficial effects against diverse conditions including HIV infection, leukemia and some other forms of cancer, recovery following heart attack, acute kidney injury, and some types of retinopathy.
