= Runt domain =

Evolutionary conserved protein domain

Identifiers
- Symbol: Runt
- Pfam: PF00853
- InterPro: IPR013524
- SCOP2: 1cmo / SCOPe / SUPFAM
Available protein structures:
- Pfam: structures / ECOD
- PDB: RCSB PDB; PDBe; PDBj
- PDBsum: structure summary
- PDB: 1eaqA:48-182 1hjbC:60-182 1hjcD:60-182 1io4C:60-182 1eaoA:48-182 1eanA:48-182 1e50E:50-182 1co1A:61-175 1h9dC:50-182 1ljmB:51-181 1cmoA:52-178

The Runt domain is an evolutionary conserved protein domain. The AML1/RUNX1 gene is rearranged by the t(8;21) translocation in acute myeloid leukemia. The gene is highly similar to the Drosophila melanogaster segmentation gene runt and to the mouse transcription factor PEBP2 alpha subunit gene. The region of shared similarity, known as the Runt domain, is responsible for DNA-binding and protein-protein interaction.

In addition to the highly conserved Runt domain, the AML-1 gene product carries a putative ATP-binding site (GRSGRGKS), and has a C-terminal region rich in proline and serine residues. The protein, commonly referred to as RUNX1 (also known as acute myeloid leukemia 1 protein, AML-1, or the core-binding factor alpha-B subunit) binds to the core site, 5'-pygpyggt-3', of a number of enhancers and promoters.

The functional protein forms a heterodimer composed of an alpha and a beta subunit. The alpha subunit can bind DNA on its own and plays an essential role in the development of normal hematopoiesis (blood cell formation). CBF is a nuclear protein expressed in numerous tissue types, except brain and heart; highest levels have been found to occur in thymus, bone marrow and peripheral blood.

This domain occurs towards the N-terminus of the proteins in this entry.

== Examples ==
Human genes encoding proteins with a Runt domain include:

- RUNX1 – essential for hematopoiesis
- RUNX2 – critical for bone development
- RUNX3 – involved in neurogenesis and T-cell development

== See also ==
- Pair-rule gene - for runt gene in Drosophila melanogaster
