= CBFB =

Protein-coding gene in humans

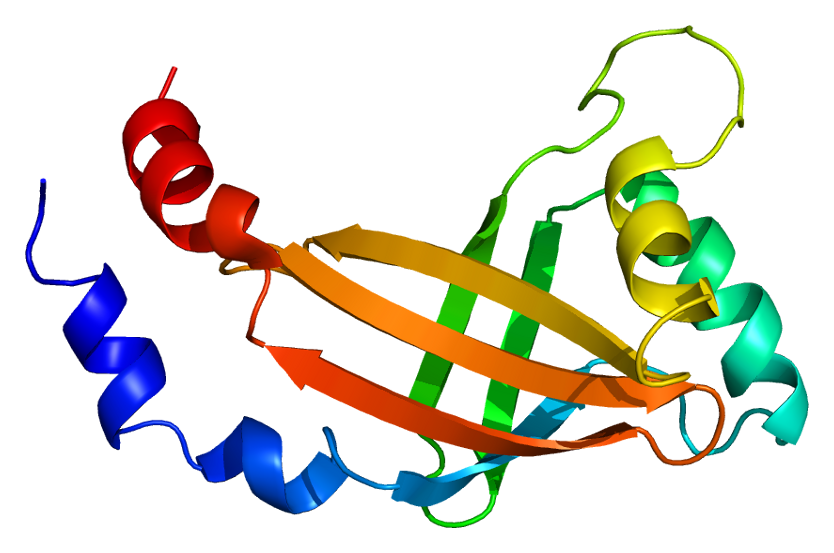

Identifiers
- Aliases: CBFB, PEBP2B, core-binding factor, beta subunit, core-binding factor beta subunit, core-binding factor subunit beta
- External IDs: OMIM: 121360; MGI: 99851; GeneCards: CBFB
Available structures
PDB	Ortholog search: PDBe RCSB
PDB	List of PDB id codes 1CL3, 1E50, 1H9D, 4N9F

Gene location (Human)
Chr.	Chromosome 16 (human)
Band	16q22.1	Start	67,028,984 bp
Band	16q22.1	End	67,101,058 bp

Gene location (Mouse)
Chr.	Chromosome 8 (mouse)
Band	8 D3|8 53.04 cM	Start	105,897,306 bp
Band	8 D3|8 53.04 cM	End	105,944,621 bp
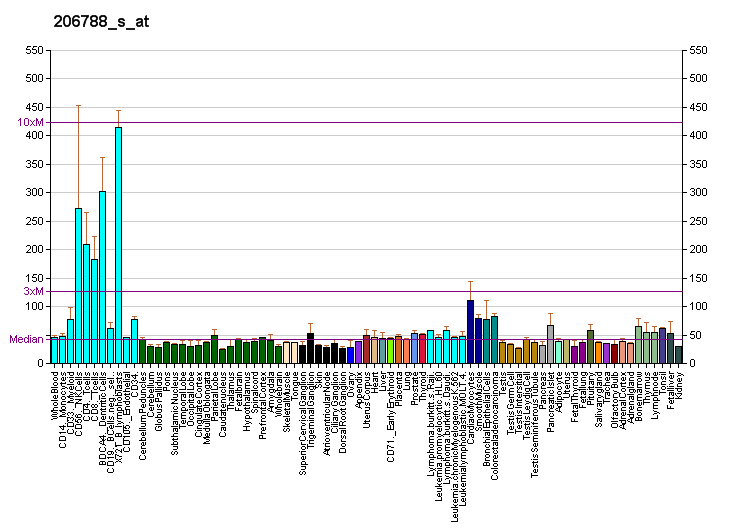

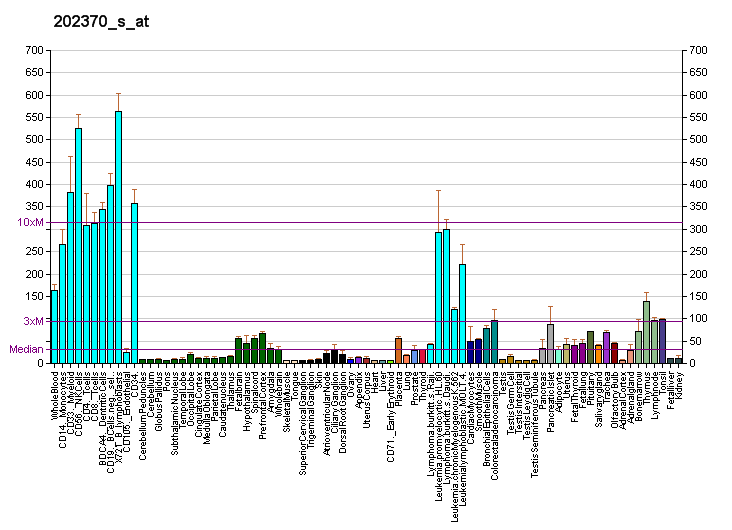
RNA expression pattern
Bgee	Human / Mouse (ortholog); Top expressed in: secondary oocyte; sural nerve; tibia; Achilles tendon; periodontal fiber; tibialis anterior muscle; cartilage tissue; bone marrow cell; islet of Langerhans; Epithelium of choroid plexus / Top expressed in: trigeminal ganglion; calvaria; triceps brachii muscle; sternocleidomastoid muscle; quadriceps femoris muscle; extensor digitorum longus muscle; temporal muscle; vastus lateralis muscle; plantaris muscle; body of femur; More reference expression data
BioGPS	More reference expression data
Gene ontology
Molecular function	DNA-binding transcription factor activity; transcription coactivator activity; protein binding; DNA binding; DNA-binding transcription factor activity, RNA polymerase II-specific; transcription coregulator activity; sequence-specific DNA binding
Cellular component	nucleus; membrane; nucleoplasm; core-binding factor complex
Biological process	definitive hemopoiesis; myeloid cell differentiation; protein polyubiquitination; cell maturation; transcription by RNA polymerase II; ossification; osteoblast differentiation; positive regulation of transcription by RNA polymerase II; lymphocyte differentiation; regulation of cytokine-mediated signaling pathway; regulation of Wnt signaling pathway; regulation of intracellular estrogen receptor signaling pathway; regulation of regulatory T cell differentiation; regulation of keratinocyte differentiation; regulation of myeloid cell differentiation; regulation of megakaryocyte differentiation; regulation of B cell receptor signaling pathway; regulation of hematopoietic stem cell differentiation; regulation of bicellular tight junction assembly; transcription initiation from RNA polymerase II promoter; negative regulation of transcription by RNA polymerase II; negative regulation of CD4-positive, alpha-beta T cell differentiation; positive regulation of CD8-positive, alpha-beta T cell differentiation
Sources:Amigo / QuickGO
Orthologs
Databases	NCBI: entry; OMA: entry
Species	Human	Mouse
Entrez	865	12400
Ensembl	ENSG00000067955	ENSMUSG00000031885
UniProt	Q13951	Q08024
RefSeq (mRNA)	NM_001755; NM_022845; NM_001368707; NM_001368708; NM_001368709 NM_001368710	NM_001161456; NM_001161457; NM_001161458; NM_022309
RefSeq (protein)	NP_001746; NP_074036; NP_001355636; NP_001355637; NP_001355638 NP_001355639	NP_001154928; NP_001154929; NP_001154930; NP_071704
Location (UCSC)	Chr 16: 67.03 – 67.1 Mb	Chr 8: 105.9 – 105.94 Mb
PubMed search
- Wikidata
View/Edit Human	View/Edit Mouse

Core-binding factor subunit beta is a protein that in humans is encoded by the CBFB gene.

The protein encoded by this gene is the beta subunit of a heterodimeric core-binding transcription factor belonging to the PEBP2/CBF transcription factor family which master-regulates a host of genes specific to hematopoiesis (e.g., RUNX1) and osteogenesis (e.g., RUNX2). The beta subunit is a non-DNA binding regulatory subunit; it allosterically enhances DNA binding by the alpha subunit as the complex binds to the core site of various enhancers and promoters, including murine leukemia virus, polyomavirus enhancer, T-cell receptor enhancers and GM-CSF promoters. Alternative splicing generates two mRNA variants, each encoding a distinct carboxyl terminus. In some cases, a pericentric inversion of chromosome 16 [inv(16)(p13q22)] produces a chimeric transcript consisting of the N terminus of core-binding factor beta in a fusion with the C-terminal portion of the smooth muscle myosin heavy chain 11. This chromosomal rearrangement is associated with acute myeloid leukemia of the M4Eo subtype. Two transcript variants encoding different isoforms have been found for this gene.

Mutations in CBFB are implicated in cases of breast cancer.

Core binding factor acute myeloid leukaemia is a cancer related to genetic changes in the CBF gene. It is most commonly caused by an inversion of particular region of chromosome 16; however it can also be caused by translocation between copies of chromosome 16. The rearrangements cause formation of CBF but with impaired function. This prevents proper differentiation of blood cells, leading to the formation of Myeloblast.
