= RUNX3 =

Protein-coding gene in humans

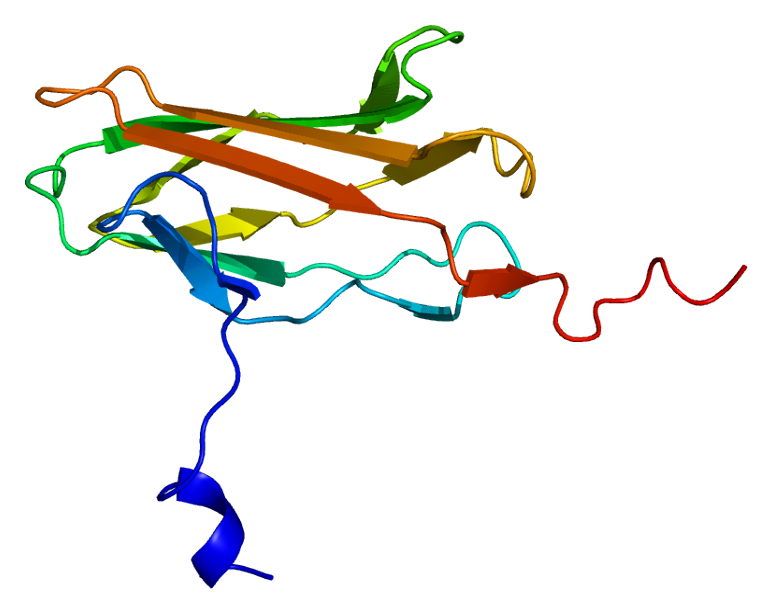

Identifiers
- Aliases: RUNX3, AML2, CBFA3, PEBP2aC, runt related transcription factor 3, RUNX family transcription factor 3
- External IDs: OMIM: 600210; MGI: 102672; GeneCards: RUNX3

Gene location (Human)
Chr.	Chromosome 1 (human)
Band	1p36.11	Start	24,899,511 bp
Band	1p36.11	End	24,965,121 bp

Gene location (Mouse)
Chr.	Chromosome 4 (mouse)
Band	4 D3|4 67.19 cM	Start	134,847,963 bp
Band	4 D3|4 67.19 cM	End	134,905,301 bp
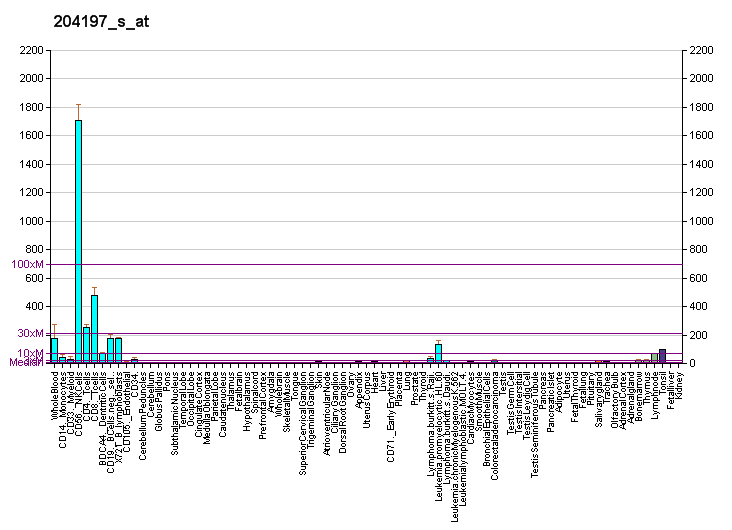

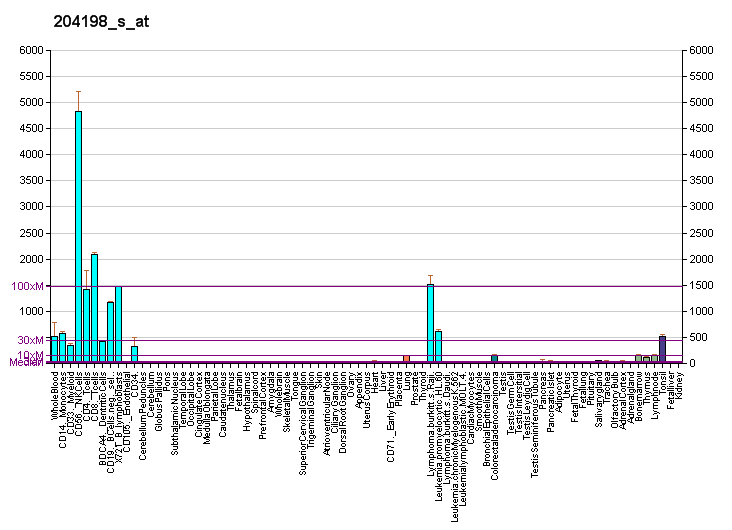
RNA expression pattern
Bgee	Human / Mouse (ortholog); Top expressed in: granulocyte; buccal mucosa cell; lymph node; blood; appendix; mononuclear cell; tibia; spleen; monocyte; bone marrow cell / Top expressed in: membranous bone; Dermatocranium; mandible; spleen; mesenteric lymph nodes; clavicle; blood; tongue; urethra; maxilla; More reference expression data
BioGPS	More reference expression data
Gene ontology
Molecular function	DNA binding; RNA polymerase II transcription regulatory region sequence-specific DNA binding; DNA-binding transcription factor activity; protein binding; ATP binding; DNA-binding transcription factor activity, RNA polymerase II-specific
Cellular component	cytoplasm; nucleus; nucleolus; intracellular membrane-bounded organelle; nucleoplasm; cytosol; core-binding factor complex
Biological process	peripheral nervous system neuron development; regulation of transcription, DNA-templated; chondrocyte differentiation; ossification; regulation of transcription by RNA polymerase II; negative regulation of cell cycle; negative regulation of transcription by RNA polymerase II; transcription by RNA polymerase II; transcription, DNA-templated; positive regulation of transcription, DNA-templated; protein phosphorylation; negative regulation of epithelial cell proliferation; regulation of cell differentiation; response to transforming growth factor beta; hemopoiesis; negative regulation of CD4-positive, alpha-beta T cell differentiation; positive regulation of CD8-positive, alpha-beta T cell differentiation; neuron differentiation
Sources:Amigo / QuickGO
Orthologs
Databases	NCBI: entry; OMA: entry
Species	Human	Mouse
Entrez	864	12399
Ensembl	ENSG00000020633	ENSMUSG00000070691
UniProt	Q13761	Q3U1Q3
RefSeq (mRNA)	NM_001031680; NM_004350; NM_001320672	NM_019732; NM_001369050
RefSeq (protein)	NP_001026850; NP_001307601; NP_004341	NP_062706; NP_001355979
Location (UCSC)	Chr 1: 24.9 – 24.97 Mb	Chr 4: 134.85 – 134.91 Mb
PubMed search
- Wikidata
View/Edit Human	View/Edit Mouse

Runt-related transcription factor 3 is a protein that in humans is encoded by the RUNX3 gene.

== Function ==
This gene encodes a member of the runt domain-containing family of transcription factors. A heterodimer of this protein and a beta subunit forms a complex that binds to the core DNA sequence 5'-YGYGGT-3' found in a number of enhancers and promoters, and can either activate or suppress transcription. It also interacts with other transcription factors. It functions as a tumor suppressor, and the gene is frequently deleted or transcriptionally silenced in cancer. Multiple transcript variants encoding different isoforms have been found for this gene.

In melanocytic cells RUNX3 gene expression may be regulated by MITF.

RUNX3 plays a fundamental role in defense against early tumor formation. In response to growth factors, RUNX3 is acetylated by p300 to complex with bromodomain-containing protein 2 (BRD2; a member of the BET family of transcription co-regulators) and to subsequent transient induction of CDKN1A and ARF. CDKN1A (also known as CIP1 or p21) inhibits the cell cycle, and ARF inhibits MDM2, increasing the stability of the cancer-suppressing gene p53.

The expression of CDKN1A and ARF under wild-type cell cycles is temporary, which results from the RUNX3-BRD2 complex replacing the RUNX3-cyclinD1 complex. However, oncogenic mitogen signals such as KRAS^{G12D} cause the RUNX3-BRD2 complex to be maintained continuously, resulting in the continuous expression of p21, ARF, and p53. Therefore, RUNX3 can function as a sensor for unregulated mitogenic signals, and its inactivation can ultimately lead to cancer due to the loss of function as a sensor.

== Knockout mouse ==
Runx3 null mouse gastric mucosa exhibits hyperplasia due to stimulated proliferation and suppressed apoptosis in epithelial cells, and the cells are resistant to TGF-beta stimulation.

== The RUNX3 controversy and resolution ==
In 2011 doubt was cast over the tumor suppressor function of Runx3 originated from the earlier publication by Li and co-workers. On the basis of the original study by Li and co-workers (2002), the majority of later literature citing Li and co-workers (2002) assumed that RUNX3 was expressed in the normal gut epithelium and that it is therefore likely to act as a tumor suppressor in the particular epithelial cancer investigated. Most of this literature used RUNX3 promoter methylation status in various cancers as a proxy for its expression. However, quite many genes are known to be methylated in tumor cell genomes, and the majority of these genes are not expressed in the normal tissue of origin of these cancers. Others used poorly characterized (or fully invalidated) antibodies to detect the RUNX3 protein, or used RT-PCR or validated antibodies and failed to detect RUNX3 in the gut epithelium but still did not question the original finding by Li and co-workers (2002). This facts have recently been discussed in a book by Ülo Maiväli.

In late 2009, a report written by Kosei Ito and his co-workers resolved the controversy by verifying that RUNX3 is indeed expressed in human and mouse gastrointestinal tract (GIT) epithelium and it functions as a tumor suppressor in gastric and colorectal tissues. The authors of the paper suggested that the previous conflicting report might be caused by use of a specific antibody, known as G-poly. Ito and his team generated multiple anti-RUNX3 monoclonal antibodies recognizing the RUNX3 N-terminal region (residues 1-234). The researchers found that the antibodies react with RUNX3 in gastric epithelial cells, whereas those recognizing the C-terminal region did not. G-poly primarily recognizes the region beyond 234 and hence, is unable to detect Runx3 in this tissue.

== Interactions ==
RUNX3 has been shown to interact with TLE1.

== See also ==
- Core binding factor
- RUNX1
- RUNX2
