= HLX (gene) =

Protein-coding gene in humans

Identifiers
- Aliases: HLX, HB24, HLX1, H2.0 like homeobox
- External IDs: OMIM: 142995; MGI: 96109; GeneCards: HLX

Gene location (Human)
Chr.	Chromosome 1 (human)
Band	1q41	Start	220,879,431 bp
Band	1q41	End	220,885,059 bp

Gene location (Mouse)
Chr.	Chromosome 1 (mouse)
Band	1 H5|1 88.97 cM	Start	184,459,337 bp
Band	1 H5|1 88.97 cM	End	184,464,816 bp
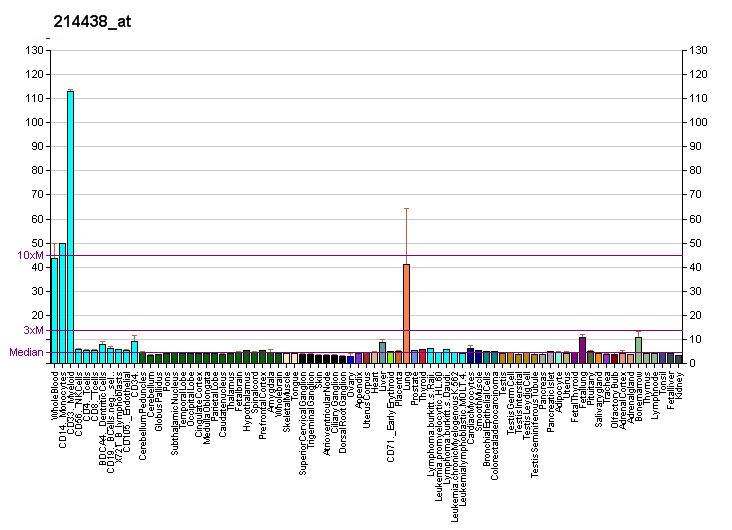
RNA expression pattern
Bgee	Human / Mouse (ortholog); Top expressed in: stromal cell of endometrium; muscle layer of sigmoid colon; bone marrow; blood; placenta; Achilles tendon; upper lobe of left lung; right lung; bone marrow cell; right lobe of liver / Top expressed in: granulocyte; gallbladder; stroma of bone marrow; sclerotome; spermatocyte; urethra; female urethra; tibiofemoral joint; yolk sac; male urethra; More reference expression data
BioGPS	More reference expression data
Gene ontology
Molecular function	protein binding; sequence-specific DNA binding; DNA binding; DNA-binding transcription factor activity, RNA polymerase II-specific
Cellular component	nucleus
Biological process	negative regulation of T-helper 2 cell differentiation; regulation of transcription, DNA-templated; multicellular organism development; enteric nervous system development; positive regulation of organ growth; positive regulation of cell population proliferation; skeletal muscle tissue development; cell differentiation; liver development; positive regulation of T-helper 1 cell differentiation; transcription, DNA-templated; embryonic digestive tract morphogenesis; animal organ development; regulation of transcription by RNA polymerase II
Sources:Amigo / QuickGO
Orthologs
Databases	NCBI: entry; OMA: entry
Species	Human	Mouse
Entrez	3142	15284
Ensembl	ENSG00000136630	ENSMUSG00000039377
UniProt	Q14774	Q61670
RefSeq (mRNA)	NM_021958	NM_008250
RefSeq (protein)	NP_068777	NP_032276
Location (UCSC)	Chr 1: 220.88 – 220.89 Mb	Chr 1: 184.46 – 184.46 Mb
PubMed search
- Wikidata
View/Edit Human	View/Edit Mouse

Homeobox Protein HB24 is a protein that in humans is encoded by the HLX gene.

== Role in development ==
Hlx belongs to the class of homeobox transcription factors, initially cloned from a B-lymphocyte cell line. Targeted knockout of the gene has demonstrated its vital role in liver and gut organogenesis. Its expression is first noticed in embryonic day 9.5 (E9.5) in the splanchnic mesoderm caudal to the level of the heart and foregut pocket, and in the branchial arches. Around E10- E12.5, the expression becomes more prominent in the mesenchyme of the visceral organs of the gut such as liver, intestines and gall bladder. Hlx is essential for liver and gut expansion, but not for onset of their development. Heterozygous knockouts of Hlx (Hlx ^{+/}−) are normal whereas homozygous knockouts (Hlx ^{−/–}) develop severe hypoplasia of the liver and gut along with anaemia. Hlx controls the epithelial-mesenchymal interaction necessary for liver and gut expansion. At E8.0, the primary liver bud is formed from the midgut endoderm in response to signals from the cardiogenic mesoderm. This is followed by signals from the septum transversum that induce epithelial-mesenchymal transition in the hepatic progenitors of the gut endoderm. In a third stage, these signaling factors induce the liver endoderm to undergo proliferation and form liver cords. The same factor controls gut proliferation, and Hlx governs its expression. Although these mice develop anaemia, it is likely due to insufficient support from the liver in producing matrix component needed for hematopoiesis rather than an intrinsic defect in the hematopoietic cells.
