= RUNX1 =

Protein-coding gene in humans

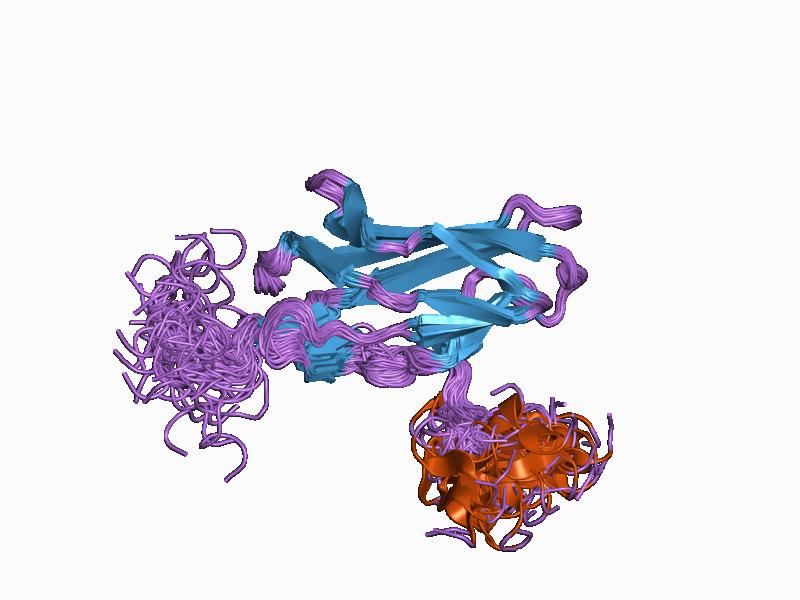

Identifiers
- Aliases: RUNX1, AML1, AML1-EVI-1, AMLCR1, CBF2alpha, CBFA2, EVI-1, PEBP2aB, PEBP2alpha, runt related transcription factor 1, RUNX family transcription factor 1
- External IDs: OMIM: 151385; MGI: 99852; GeneCards: RUNX1
Available structures
PDB	Ortholog search: PDBe RCSB
PDB	List of PDB id codes 1CMO, 1CO1, 1E50, 1H9D, 1LJM

Gene location (Human)
Chr.	Chromosome 21 (human)
Band	21q22.12	Start	34,787,801 bp
Band	21q22.12	End	36,004,667 bp

Gene location (Mouse)
Chr.	Chromosome 16 (mouse)
Band	16 C4|16 53.7 cM	Start	92,398,354 bp
Band	16 C4|16 53.7 cM	End	92,623,037 bp
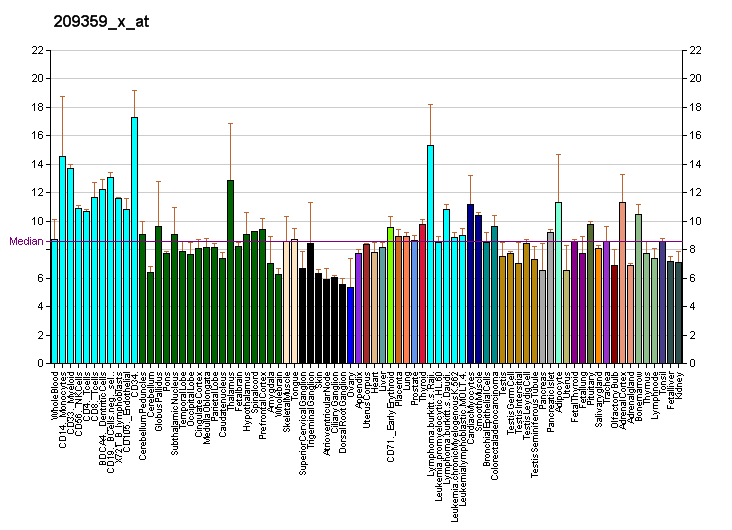

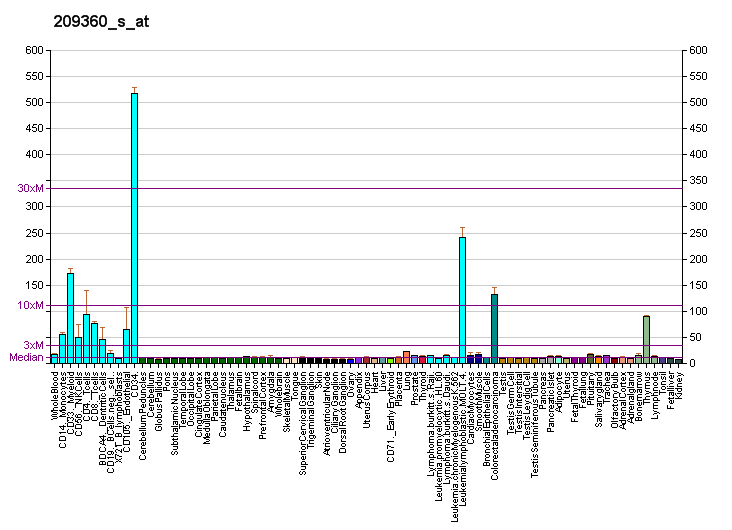

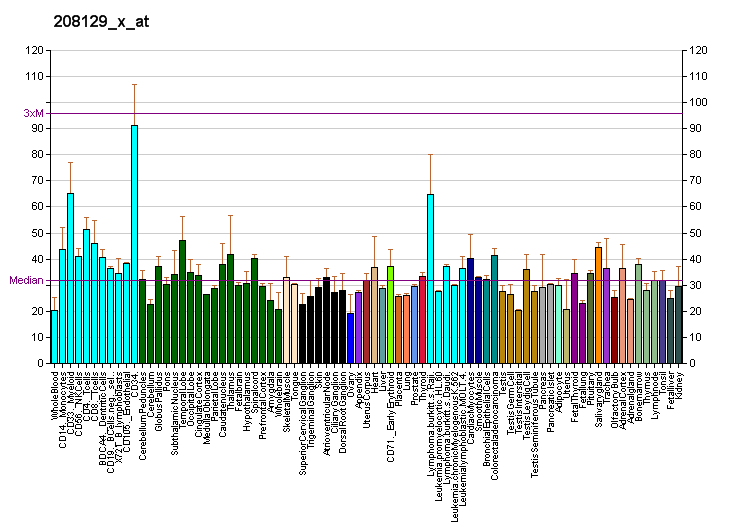
RNA expression pattern
Bgee	Human / Mouse (ortholog); Top expressed in: olfactory zone of nasal mucosa; epithelium of bronchus; mucosa of paranasal sinus; bronchial epithelial cell; nasal epithelium; visceral pleura; tendon of biceps brachii; trabecular bone; epithelium of nasopharynx; minor salivary glands / Top expressed in: lumbar spinal ganglion; Dermatocranium; membranous bone; decidua; lower jaw; granulocyte; maxilla; mandible; gastrula; cumulus cell; More reference expression data
BioGPS	More reference expression data
Gene ontology
Molecular function	DNA binding; calcium ion binding; RNA polymerase II transcription regulatory region sequence-specific DNA binding; protein homodimerization activity; DNA-binding transcription factor activity; DNA-binding transcription activator activity, RNA polymerase II-specific; transcription factor binding; protein binding; protein heterodimerization activity; ATP binding; DNA-binding transcription factor activity, RNA polymerase II-specific; RNA polymerase II cis-regulatory region sequence-specific DNA binding
Cellular component	intracellular membrane-bounded organelle; nucleus; cytosol; nucleoplasm; core-binding factor complex
Biological process	peripheral nervous system neuron development; myeloid cell differentiation; regulation of transcription, DNA-templated; chondrocyte differentiation; ossification; negative regulation of granulocyte differentiation; hematopoietic stem cell proliferation; transcription, DNA-templated; positive regulation of angiogenesis; positive regulation of transcription, DNA-templated; positive regulation of interleukin-2 production; positive regulation of granulocyte differentiation; positive regulation of transcription by RNA polymerase II; transcription by RNA polymerase II; regulation of cytokine-mediated signaling pathway; regulation of Wnt signaling pathway; regulation of intracellular estrogen receptor signaling pathway; regulation of regulatory T cell differentiation; regulation of keratinocyte differentiation; regulation of myeloid cell differentiation; regulation of megakaryocyte differentiation; regulation of B cell receptor signaling pathway; regulation of hematopoietic stem cell differentiation; regulation of bicellular tight junction assembly; hemopoiesis; negative regulation of transcription by RNA polymerase II; negative regulation of CD4-positive, alpha-beta T cell differentiation; positive regulation of CD8-positive, alpha-beta T cell differentiation; negative regulation of gene expression; neuron differentiation
Sources:Amigo / QuickGO
Orthologs
Databases	NCBI: entry; OMA: entry
Species	Human	Mouse
Entrez	861	12394
Ensembl	ENSG00000159216	ENSMUSG00000022952
UniProt	Q01196	Q03347
RefSeq (mRNA)	NM_001001890; NM_001122607; NM_001754	NM_001111021; NM_001111022; NM_001111023; NM_009821
RefSeq (protein)	NP_001001890; NP_001116079; NP_001745	n/a
Location (UCSC)	Chr 21: 34.79 – 36 Mb	Chr 16: 92.4 – 92.62 Mb
PubMed search
- Wikidata
View/Edit Human	View/Edit Mouse

Runt-related transcription factor 1 (RUNX1) also known as acute myeloid leukemia 1 protein (AML1) or core-binding factor subunit alpha-2 (CBFA2) and it is a protein that is encoded by the RUNX1 gene, in humans.

RUNX1 is a transcription factor that regulates the differentiation of hematopoietic stem cells into mature blood cells. In addition it plays a major role in the development of the neurons that transmit pain. It belongs to the Runt-related transcription factor (RUNX) family of genes which are also called core binding factor-α (CBFα). RUNX proteins form a heterodimeric complex with CBFβ which confers increased DNA binding and stability to the complex.

Chromosomal translocations involving the RUNX1 gene are associated with several types of leukemia including M2 AML. Mutations in RUNX1 are implicated in cases of breast cancer.

== Gene and protein ==
In humans, the gene RUNX1 is 260 kilobases (kb) in length, and is located on chromosome 21 (21q22.12). The gene can be transcribed from two alternative promoters, promoter 1 (distal) or promoter 2 (proximal). As a result, various isoforms of RUNX1 can be synthesized, facilitated by alternative splicing. The full-length RUNX1 protein is encoded by 12 exons. Among the exons are two defined domains, namely the runt homology domain (RHD) or the runt domain (exons 2, 3 and 4), and the transactivation domain (TAD) (exon 6). These domains are necessary for RUNX1 to mediate DNA binding and protein-protein interactions respectively. The transcription of RUNX1 is regulated by two enhancers (regulatory element 1 and regulatory element 2), and these tissue specific enhancers enable the binding of lymphoid or erythroid regulatory proteins, therefore the gene activity of RUNX1 is highly active in the haematopoietic system.

The protein RUNX1 is composed of 453 amino acids. As a transcription factor (TF), its DNA binding ability is encoded by the runt domain (residues 50 – 177), which is homologous to the p53 family. The runt domain of RUNX1 binds to the core consensus sequence TGTGGNNN (where NNN can represent either TTT or TCA). DNA recognition is achieved by loops of the 12-stranded β-barrel and the C-terminus "tail" (residues 170 – 177), which clamp around the sugar phosphate backbone and fits into the major and minor grooves of DNA. Specificity is achieved by making direct or water-mediated contacts with the bases. RUNX1 can bind DNA as a monomer, but its DNA binding affinity is enhanced by 10 fold if it heterodimerises with the core binding factor β (CBFβ), also via the runt domain. In fact, the RUNX family is often referred to as α-subunits, together with binding of a common β-subunit CBFβ, RUNX can behave as heterodimeric transcription factors collectively called the core binding factors (CBFs).

The consensus binding site for CBF has been identified to be a 7 bp sequence PyGPyGGTPy. Py denotes pyrimidine which can be either cytosine or thymine.

== Discovery and characterization of RUNX1 ==
Christiane Nüsslein-Volhard and Eric F. Wieschaus discovered the transcription factor RUNX in a screen that was conducted to identify mutations that affect segment number and polarity in Drosophila melanogaster. The mutation that led to presegmentation patterning defects and runted embryos was named runt. Following this discovery, the Drosophila segmentation gene runt was cloned by Gergen et al. Although the protein encoded by runt was demonstrated to exhibit nuclear translocation, it was not yet established that this protein is a transcription factor. Subsequently, in 1991, Ohki et al. cloned the human RUNX1 gene; RUNX1 was found to be rearranged in the leukemic cell DNAs from t(8;21)(q22;q22) acute myeloid leukemia patients. However, the function of human RUNX1 was not established. Soon after the discovery of the drosophila runt protein and the human RUNX1 protein, RUNX1's function was discovered. RUNX1 was purified as a sequence-specific DNA-binding protein that regulated the disease specificity of the Moloney murine Leukemia virus. Furthermore, Ito et al. purified RUNX2, the homolog of RUNX1. Purified transcription factors consisted of two subunits, a DNA binding CBFα chain (RUNX1 or RUNX2) and a non-DNA-binding subunit called core binding factor β (CBFβ); the binding affinity of RUNX1 and RUNX2 was significantly increased by association with CBFβ.

== Mouse knockout ==
Mice embryos with homozygous mutations on RUNX1 died at about 12.5 days. The embryos displayed lack of fetal liver hematopoiesis.

Similar experiments from a different research group demonstrated that the knockout embryos die between embryonic days 11.5 and 12.5 due to hemorrhaging in the central nervous system (CNS).

== Participation in haematopoiesis ==
RUNX1 plays a crucial role in adult (definitive) haematopoiesis during embryonic development. It is expressed in all haematopoietic sites that contribute to the formation of haematopoietic stem and progenitor cells (HSPCs), including the yolk sac, allantois, placenta, para-aortic splanchnopleura (P-Sp; (the visceral mesodermal layer), aorta-gonad-mesonephros (AGM) and the umbilical and vitelline arteries. HSPCs are generated via the hemogenic endothelium, a special subset of endothelial cells scattered within blood vessels that can differentiate into haematopoietic cells. The emergence of HSPCs is often studied in mouse and zebrafish animal models, in which HSPCs appear as "intra-aortic" clusters that adhere to the ventral wall of the dorsal aorta. RUNX1 or CBF takes part in this process by mediating the transition of an endothelial cell to become a haematopoietic cell. There is increasing evidence that RUNX1 may also be important during primitive haematopoiesis. This is because in RUNX1 knockout mice, primitive erythrocytes displayed a defective morphology and the size of blast cell population was substantially reduced, apart from the absence of HSPCs which would result in embryonic lethality by Embryonic day (E) 11.5 – 12.5.

At a molecular level, expression of the gene RUNX1 is upregulated by the RUNX1 intronic cis-regulatory element (+23 RUNX1 enhancer). This +23 RUNX1 enhancer contains conserved motifs that encourage binding of various haematopoiesis related regulators such as Gata2, ETS factors (Fli-1, Elf-1, PU.1) and the SCL / Lmo2 / Ldb1 complex, as well as RUNX1 itself acting in an auto-regulatory loop. As mentioned before, the main role of RUNX1 is to modulate the fate of haematopoietic cells. This can be achieved by binding to the thrombopoietin (TPO) receptor/ c-Mpl promoter, followed by the recruitment of transcription activators or repressors in order to promote transition of the hemogenic endothelium to HSCs, or differentiation into lineages of lower haematopoietic hierarchies. RUNX1 can also modulate its own level by upregulating the expression of Smad6 to target itself for proteolysis.

== Mutations and acute myeloid leukemia ==
A broad range of heterozygous germline mutations in RUNX1 have been associated with Familial Platelet Disorder, a mild bleeding disorder associated with a high rate of myeloid leukemia. At least 39 forms of somatic RUNX1 mutation are implicated in various myeloid malignancies. Examples range from RUNX1 point mutations acquired from low-dose radiation leading to myelodysplastic neoplasms or therapy-related myeloid neoplasms, to chromosomal translocation of the RUNX1 gene with the ETO / MTG8 / RUNX1T1 gene located on chromosome 8q22, t(8; 21), generating a fusion protein AML-ETO, categorized as acute myeloid leukemia (AML) M2.

In t(8; 21), breakpoints frequently occur at intron 5 – 6 of RUNX1 and intron 1b – 2 of ETO, creating chimeric transcripts that inherit the runt domain from RUNX1, and all Nervy homology regions (NHR) 1-4 from ETO. As a consequence, AML-ETO retains the ability to bind at RUNX1 target genes whilst acting as a transcription repressor via the recruitment of corepressors and histone deacetylases, which is an intrinsic function of ETO. Oncogenic potential of AML-ETO is exerted because it blocks differentiation and promote self-renewal in blast cells, resulting in massive accumulation of blasts (>20%) in the bone marrow. This is further characterized histologically by the presence of Auer rods and epigenetically by lysine acetylation on residues 24 and 43. Other actions of AML-ETO that could induce leukemogenesis include downregulation of the DNA repair enzyme 8-oxoguanine DNA glycosylase (OGG1) and increase in the level of intracellular reactive oxygen species, making cells that express AML-ETO more susceptible to additional genetic mutations.

== Role in T-cell acute lymphoblastic leukemia (T-ALL) ==
Around 15% of T-ALL patients have RUNX1 mutations which are clustered around the DNA binding domain of RUNX1. Those mutations are proposed to cause loss-of-function and might play a tumor suppressor role.

== Participation in hair follicle development ==
Runx1 was first discovered to be expressed in mouse embryonic skin. It is expressed in the epithelial compartment to control hair follicle activation from telogen to anagen through activating Wnt signaling and Lef1 levels At the same time it is expressed in the dermis where it suppresses the same targets to allow for embryogenic development of hair shaft and follicles. In the human hair follicle the expression patterns are similar to the mouse - indicating that it plays a similar role. In addition to hair follicle development, Runx1 is also implicated in skin and epithelial cancer development. Thus there are similarities across tissue in Runx1 behavior.

== RUNX1 in Pancreatic Cancer ==
High expression of RUNX1 is associated with adverse survival of pancreatic cancer patients and has tumor promoting potential in pancreatic cancer. The most common cause of resistance to therapeutic treatments is the suppression of the programmed cell death (apoptosis) of pancreatic cancer cells. A key factor in apoptosis initiation is the protein NOXA, which is suppressed in a particularly aggressive form of pancreatic cancer. Genetic suppression of the NOXA gene is mediated by the transcription factor RUNX1. Pharmacological or genetic inhibition of RUNX1 de-represses the NOXA gene and induces apoptosis in pancreatic cancer cells.

== Interactions ==
RUNX1 has been shown to interact with:

- C-Fos,
- C-jun,
- SUV39H1
- TLE1, and
- VDR.
- Stat3

== Inhibitors ==
- Ro5-3335

== See also ==
- RUNX2
- RUNX3
