= RUNX2 =

Protein-coding gene in humans

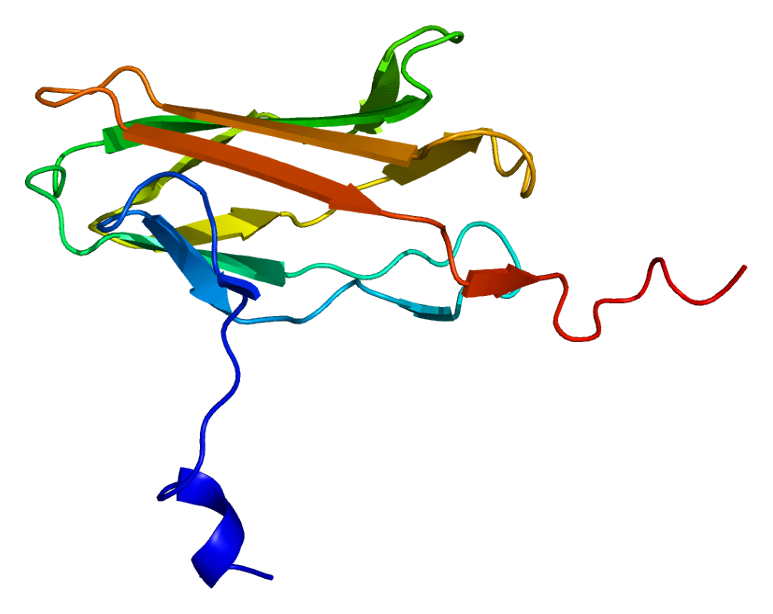

Identifiers
- Aliases: RUNX2, AML3, CBF-alpha-1, CBFA1, CCD, CCD1, CLCD, OSF-2, OSF2, PEA2aA, PEBP2aA, runt related transcription factor 2, Runx2 mRNA, RUNX family transcription factor 2
- External IDs: OMIM: 600211; MGI: 99829; GeneCards: RUNX2

Gene location (Human)
Chr.	Chromosome 6 (human)
Band	6p21.1	Start	45,328,157 bp
Band	6p21.1	End	45,664,349 bp

Gene location (Mouse)
Chr.	Chromosome 17 (mouse)
Band	17 B3|17 21.33 cM	Start	44,806,874 bp
Band	17 B3|17 21.33 cM	End	45,125,684 bp
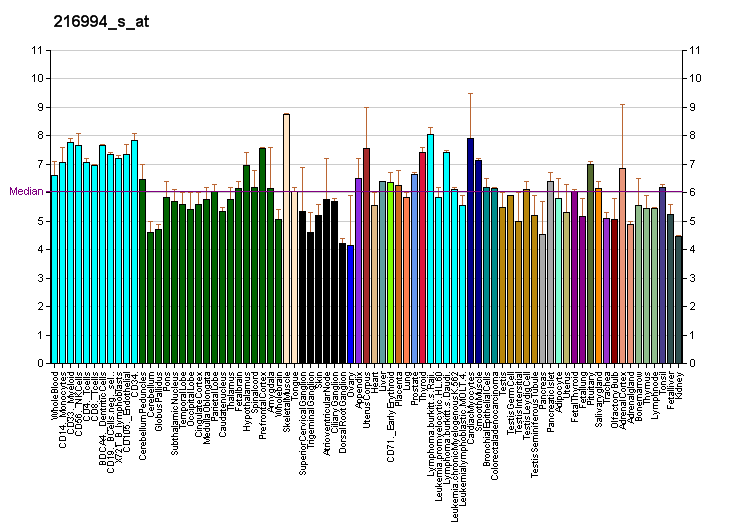

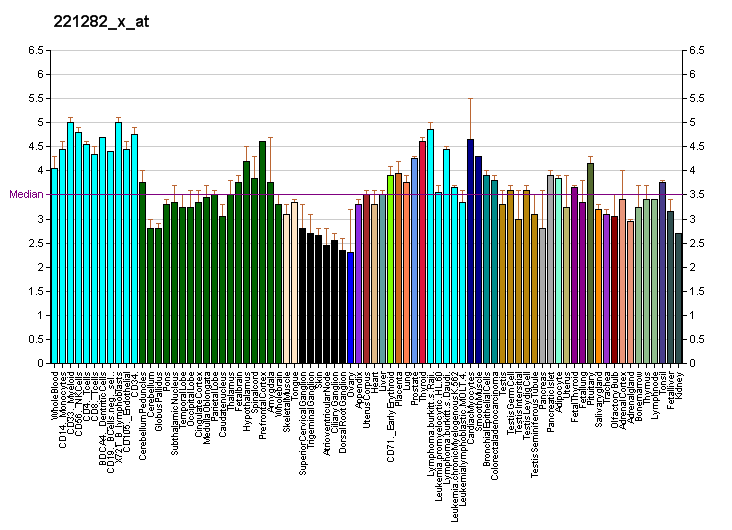
RNA expression pattern
Bgee	Human / Mouse (ortholog); Top expressed in: tibia; mucosa of paranasal sinus; trabecular bone; parotid gland; palpebral conjunctiva; testicle; mucosa of nose; cartilage tissue; amniotic fluid; blood / Top expressed in: facial skeleton; upper jaw; long bone; cartilage of bone; bones of free part of lower limb; Dermatocranium; membranous bone; body of femur; calvaria; maxilla; More reference expression data
BioGPS	More reference expression data
Gene ontology
Molecular function	DNA binding; protein domain specific binding; DNA-binding transcription factor activity; DNA-binding transcription activator activity, RNA polymerase II-specific; chromatin binding; RNA polymerase II cis-regulatory region sequence-specific DNA binding; bHLH transcription factor binding; protein binding; ATP binding; DNA-binding transcription factor activity, RNA polymerase II-specific
Cellular component	cytoplasm; transcription regulator complex; nucleus; nucleoplasm; cytosol
Biological process	skeletal system development; regulation of transcription, DNA-templated; negative regulation of smoothened signaling pathway; chondrocyte differentiation; ossification; regulation of transcription by RNA polymerase II; regulation of fibroblast growth factor receptor signaling pathway; skeletal system morphogenesis; chondrocyte development; cellular response to BMP stimulus; endochondral ossification; regulation of odontogenesis of dentin-containing tooth; cell maturation; BMP signaling pathway; stem cell differentiation; transcription, DNA-templated; odontogenesis of dentin-containing tooth; T cell differentiation; positive regulation of gene expression; regulation of osteoblast differentiation; positive regulation of chondrocyte differentiation; osteoblast differentiation; neuron differentiation; positive regulation of cell population proliferation; regulation of cell differentiation; osteoblast development; embryonic cranial skeleton morphogenesis; regulation of ossification; embryonic forelimb morphogenesis; positive regulation of transcription from RNA polymerase II promoter involved in cellular response to chemical stimulus; osteoblast fate commitment; negative regulation of transcription, DNA-templated; positive regulation of transcription, DNA-templated; transcription initiation from RNA polymerase II promoter; positive regulation of osteoblast differentiation; positive regulation of transcription by RNA polymerase II; cell differentiation; hemopoiesis; regulation of gene expression
Sources:Amigo / QuickGO
Orthologs
Databases	NCBI: entry; OMA: entry
Species	Human	Mouse
Entrez	860	12393
Ensembl	ENSG00000124813	ENSMUSG00000039153
UniProt	Q13950	Q08775
RefSeq (mRNA)	NM_001015051; NM_001024630; NM_001278478; NM_004348; NM_001369405	NM_001145920; NM_001146038; NM_001271627; NM_001271630; NM_001271631 NM_001271633; NM_009820
RefSeq (protein)	NP_001015051; NP_001019801; NP_001265407; NP_001356334	NP_001139392; NP_001139510; NP_001258556; NP_001258559; NP_001258560 NP_033950
Location (UCSC)	Chr 6: 45.33 – 45.66 Mb	Chr 17: 44.81 – 45.13 Mb
PubMed search
- Wikidata
View/Edit Human	View/Edit Mouse

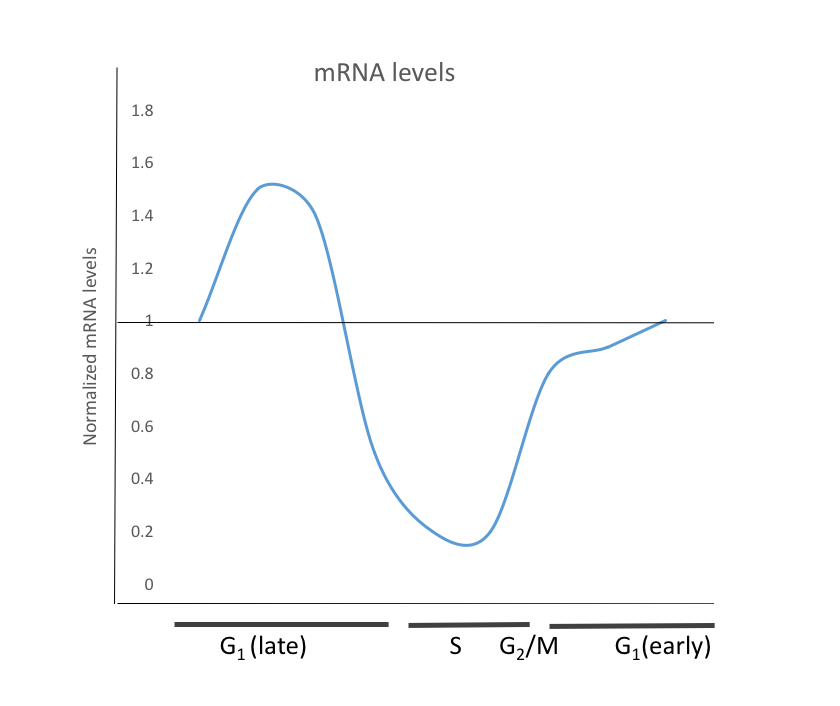
Oscillations of Runx2 mRNA levels.

Runt-related transcription factor 2 (RUNX2) also known as core-binding factor subunit alpha-1 (CBF-alpha-1) is a protein that in humans is encoded by the RUNX2 gene. RUNX2 is a key transcription factor associated with osteoblast differentiation.

It has also been suggested that Runx2 plays a cell proliferation regulatory role in cell cycle entry and exit in osteoblasts, as well as endothelial cells. Runx2 suppresses pre-osteoblast proliferation by affecting cell cycle progression in the G1 phase. In osteoblasts, the levels of Runx2 is highest in G_{1} phase and is lowest in S, G_{2}, and M. The comprehensive cell cycle regulatory mechanisms that Runx2 may play are still unknown, although it is generally accepted that the varying activity and levels of Runx2 throughout the cell cycle contribute to cell cycle entry and exit, as well as cell cycle progression. These functions are especially important when discussing bone cancer, particularly osteosarcoma development, that can be attributed to aberrant cell proliferation control.

== Function ==
=== Osteoblast differentiation ===
This protein is a member of the RUNX family of transcription factors and has a Runt DNA-binding domain. It is essential for osteoblastic differentiation and skeletal morphogenesis. It acts as a scaffold for nucleic acids and regulatory factors involved in skeletal gene expression. The protein can bind DNA both as a monomer or, with more affinity, as a subunit of a heterodimeric complex. Transcript variants of the gene that encode different protein isoforms result from the use of alternate promoters as well as alternate splicing.

The cellular dynamics of Runx2 protein are also important for proper osteoblast differentiation. Runx2 protein is detected in preosteoblasts and the expression is upregulated in immature osteoblasts and downregulated in mature osteoblasts. It is the first transcription factor required for determination of osteoblast commitment, followed by Sp7 and Wnt-signaling. Runx2 is responsible for inducing the differentiation of multipotent mesenchymal cells into immature osteoblasts, as well as activating expression of several key downstream proteins that maintain osteoblast differentiation and bone matrix genes.

Knock-out of the DNA-binding activity results in inhibition of osteoblastic differentiation. Because of this, Runx2 is often referred to as the master regulator of bone.

=== Cell cycle regulation ===
In addition to being the master regulator of osteoblast differentiation, Runx2 has also been shown to play several roles in cell cycle regulation. This is due, in part, to the fact that Runx2 interacts with many cellular proliferation genes on a transcription level, such as c-Myb and C/EBP, as well as p53. These functions are critical for osteoblast proliferation and maintenance. This is often controlled via oscillating levels of Runx2 within throughout cell cycle due to regulated degradation and transcriptional activity.

Oscillating levels of Runx2 within the cell contribute to cell cycle dynamics. In the MC3T3-E1 osteoblast cell line, Runx2 levels are a maximum during G1 and a minimum during G2, S, and mitosis. In addition, the oscillations in Runx2 contribute to G1-related anti-proliferative function. It has also been proposed that decreasing levels of Runx2 leads to cell cycle exit for proliferating and differentiating osteoblasts, and that Runx2 plays a role in mediating the final stages of osteoblast via this mechanism. Current research posits that the levels of Runx2 serve various functions.

In addition, Runx2 has been shown to interact with several kinases that contribute to facilitate cell-cycle dependent dynamics via direct protein phosphorylation. Furthermore, Runx2 controls the gene expression of cyclin D2, D3, and the CDK inhibitor p21(cip1) in hematopoietic cells. It has been shown that on a molecular level, Runx associates with the cdc2 partner cyclin B1 during mitosis. The phosphorylation state of Runx2 also mediates its DNA-binding activity. The Runx2 DNA-binding activity is correlated with cellular proliferation, which suggests Runx2 phosphorylation may also be related to Runx2-mediated cellular proliferation and cell cycle control. To support this, it has been noted that Runx is phosphorylated at Ser451 by cdc2 kinase, which facilitates cell cycle progression through the regulation of G2 and M phases.

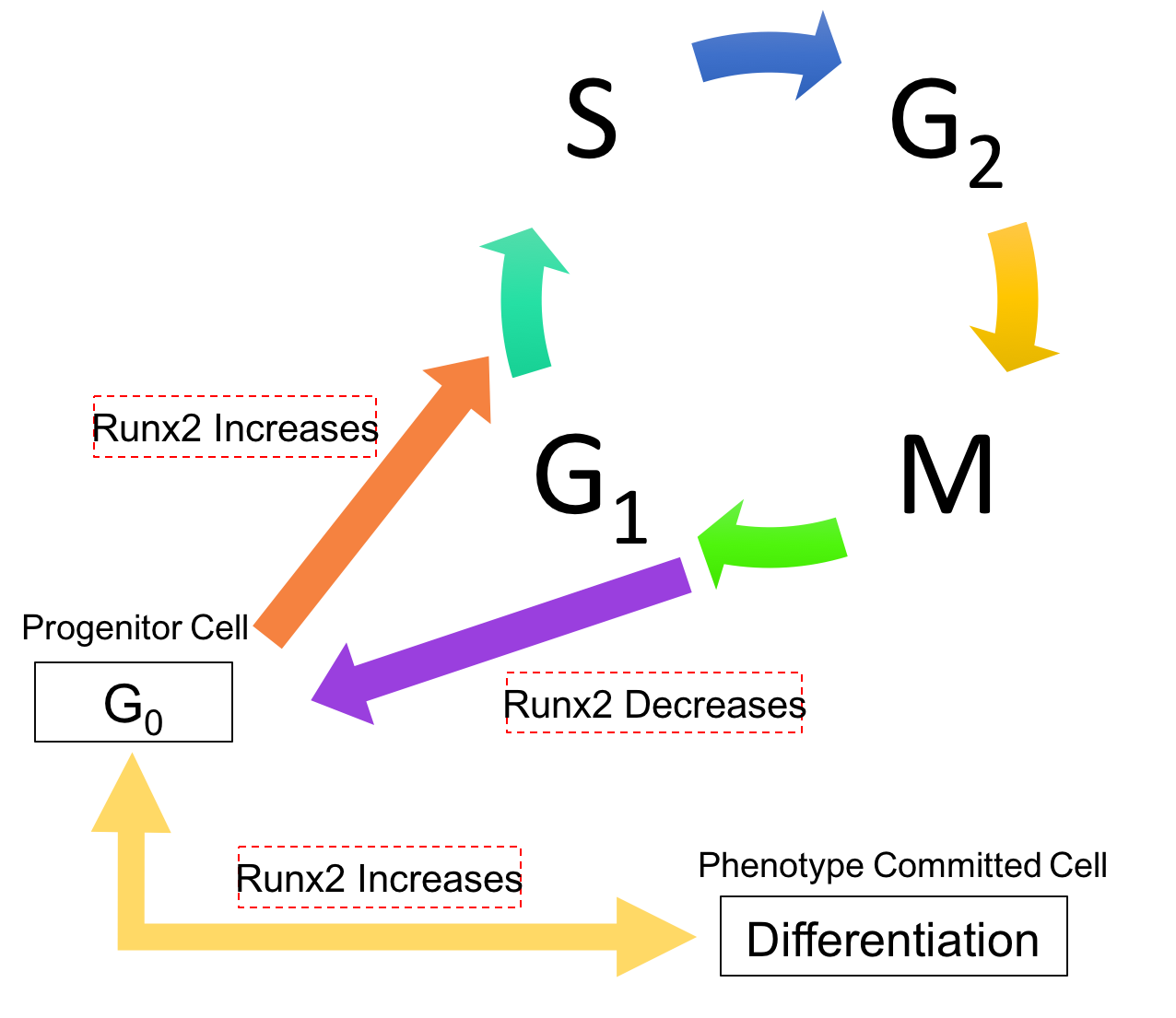
Schematic of Runx2 Levels During Cell Cycle Progression

== Pathology ==
=== Cleidocranial dysplasia ===
Mutations in Runx2 are associated with the disease Cleidocranial dysostosis. One study proposes that this phenotype arises partly due to the Runx2 dosage insufficiencies. Because Runx2 promotes exit from the cell cycle, insufficient amounts of Runx2 are related to increased proliferation of osteoblasts observed in patients with cleidocranial disostosis.

=== Osteosarcoma ===
Variants of Runx2 have been associated with the osteosarcoma phenotype. Current research suggests that this is partly due to the role of Runx2 in mitigating the cell cycle. Runx2 plays a role as a tumor suppressor of osteoblasts by halting cell cycle progression at G_{1}. Compared to normal osteoblast cell line MC3T3-E1, the oscillations of Runx2 in osteosarcoma ROS and SaOS cell lines are aberrant when compared to the oscillations of Runx2 levels in normal osteoblasts, suggesting that deregulation of Runx2 levels may contribute to abnormal cell proliferation by an inability to escape the cell cycle. Molecularly, It has been proposed that proteasome inhibition by MG132 can stabilize Runx2 protein levels in late G_{1} and S in MC3T3 cells, but not in osteosarcoma cells which consequently leads to a cancerous phenotype.

== Regulation and co-factors ==
Due to its role as a master transcription factor of osteoblast differentiation, the regulation of Runx2 is intricately connected to other processes within the cell.

Twist, Msh homeobox 2 (Msx2), and promyelocytic leukemia zinc-finger protein (PLZF) act upstream of Runx2. Osterix (Osx) acts downstream of Runx2 and serves as a marker for normal osteoblast differentiation. Zinc finger protein 521 (ZFP521) and activating transcription factor 4 (ATF4) are cofactors of Runx2. Binding of the transcriptional coregulator, WWTR1 (TAZ) to Runx2 promotes transcription.

Furthermore, in proliferating chondrocytes, Runx2 is inhibited by CyclinD1/CDK4 as part of the cell cycle.

== Interactions ==
RUNX2 has been shown to interact with:

- AR
- ER-α
- C-Fos,
- C-jun,
- HDAC3,
- MYST4,
- SMAD1
- SMAD3, and
- STUB1.

and

- SMOC1.

miR-133 and CyclinD1/CDK4 directly inhibits Runx2.

== See also ==
- RUNX1
- RUNX3
