= CCDC177 =

Protein found in humans

Identifiers
- Aliases: CCDC177, C14orf162, PLPL, coiled-coil domain containing 177
- External IDs: MGI: 2686414; GeneCards: CCDC177

Gene location (Human)
Chr.	Chromosome 14 (human)
Band	14q24.1	Start	69,569,799 bp
Band	14q24.1	End	69,574,871 bp

Gene location (Mouse)
Chr.	Chromosome 12 (mouse)
Band	12|12 C3	Start	80,800,817 bp
Band	12|12 C3	End	80,807,461 bp
RNA expression pattern
Bgee	Human / Mouse (ortholog); Top expressed in: secondary oocyte; ganglionic eminence; ventricular zone; testicle; cerebellum; cerebellar cortex; cerebellar hemisphere; right hemisphere of cerebellum; prefrontal cortex; postcentral gyrus / Top expressed in: Rostral migratory stream; substantia nigra; fossa; trigeminal ganglion; supraoptic nucleus; lateral septal nucleus; ganglionic eminence; ventromedial nucleus; lumbar subsegment of spinal cord; retina; More reference expression data
BioGPS	n/a
Orthologs
Databases	NCBI: entry; OMA: entry
Species	Human	Mouse
Entrez	56936	380768
Ensembl	ENSG00000267909	ENSMUSG00000062961
UniProt	Q9NQR7	Q3UHB8
RefSeq (mRNA)	NM_001271507; NM_020181	NM_001008423
RefSeq (protein)	NP_001258436	NP_001008423
Location (UCSC)	Chr 14: 69.57 – 69.57 Mb	Chr 12: 80.8 – 80.81 Mb
PubMed search
- Wikidata
View/Edit Human	View/Edit Mouse

Coiled-Coil Domain Containing 177 (CCDC177) is a protein, which in humans, is encoded by the gene CCDC177. It is composed of a coiled helical domain that spans half of the protein. CCDC177 deletions are associated with intellectual disability and congenital heart defects.

== Gene ==
The CCDC177 gene is located on chromosome 14 at 14q24.1, and contains 2 exons.

The location of the CCDC177 gene on chromosome 14 at 14q24.1.

The CCDC177 gene is part of the CCDC gene family, which encodes proteins involved in signal transduction and signal transcription.

Other known aliases for the CCDC177 gene are Chromosome 14 Open Reading Frame 162 (C14orf162), and Myelin Proteolipid Protein-Like Protein (PLPL).

== mRNA transcripts ==
CCDC177 has one variant, which encodes Isoform 1 in humans. The mRNA sequence for this variant is 4,182 base pairs in length. Both exons are present in the variant, however the coding region is entirely within Exon 2.

== Protein ==
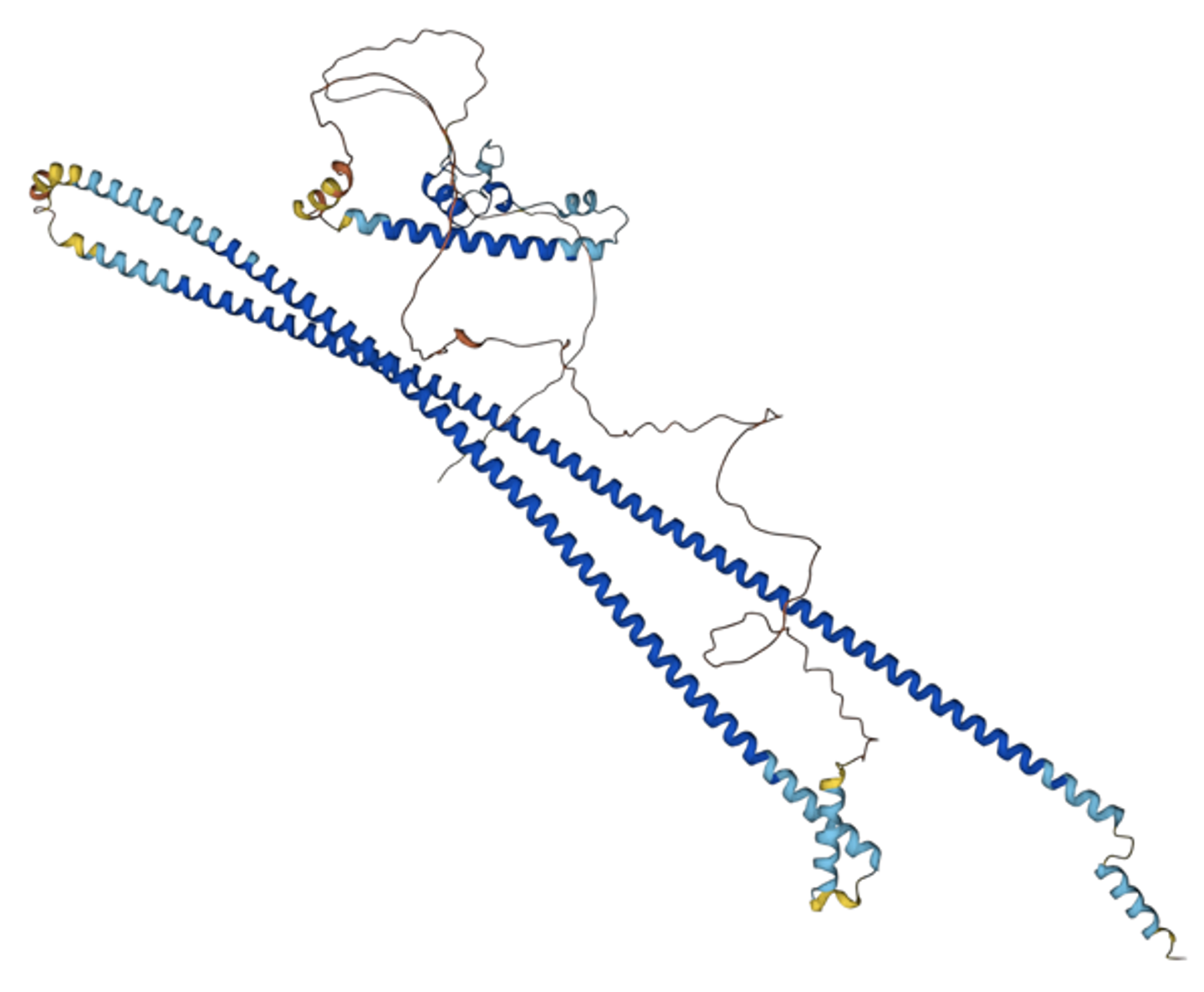
The predicted tertiary structure of human CCDC177 protein from AlphaFold.

CCDC177 Isoform 1 in humans is 707 amino acids long with a predicted molecular weight of 80 kDa. It is rich in arginine, and glutamate, and poor in isoleucine relative to other proteins. The isoelectric point is 11. The human protein is also rich in arginine-glutamate motifs, which are implicated in cell survival signaling.

=== Domains and motifs ===
Humans CCDC177 includes one domain of unknown function (DUF4659), multiple disordered regions, and an alanine-rich motif.

=== Structure ===
Proteins of the coiled coil domain containing (CCDC) family contain large coiled helical domains. The coiled helical domain within the human CCDC177 protein fully overlaps the domain of unknown function (DUF4659).

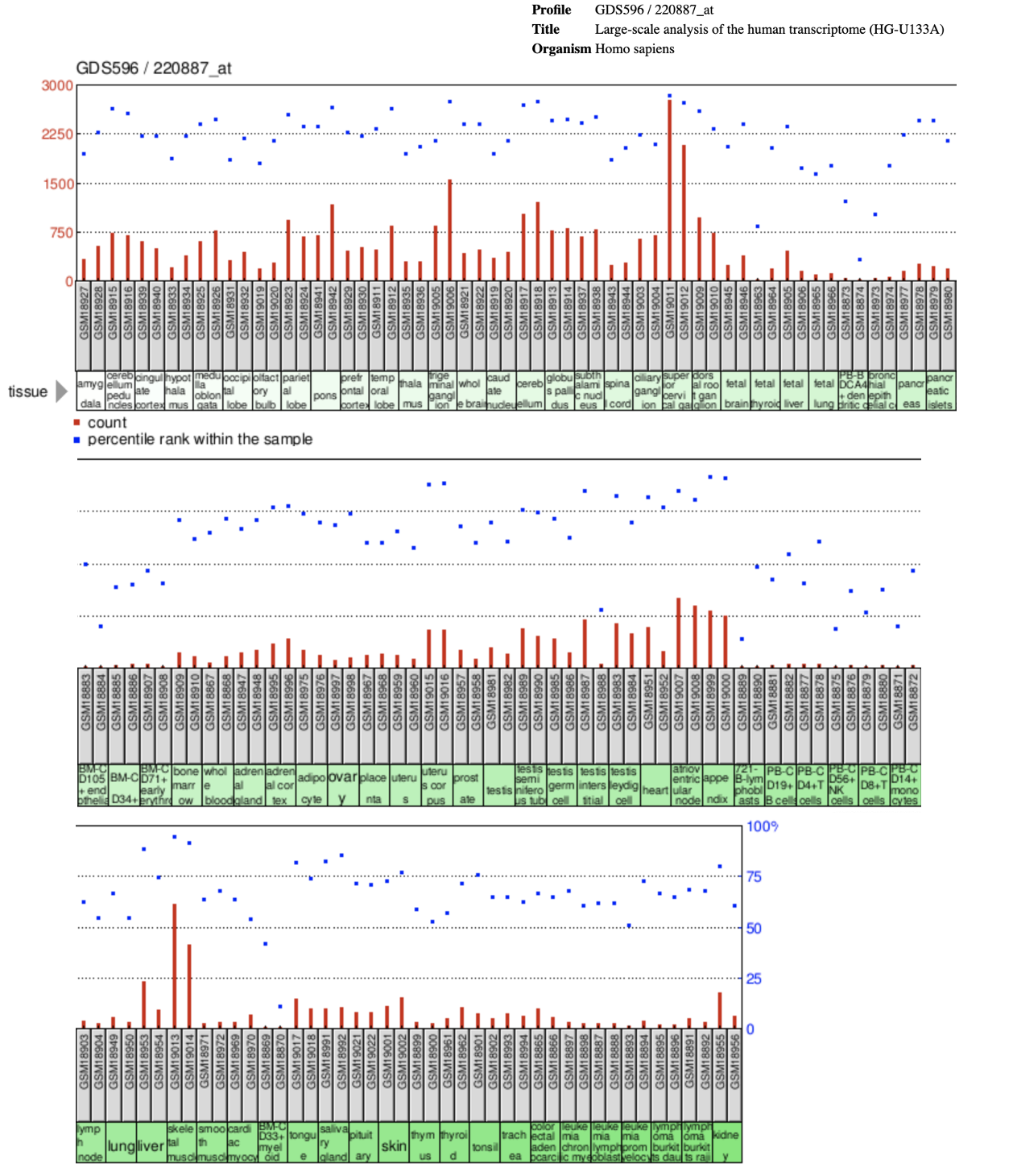
Large-scale Analysis of the Human Transcriptome [Profile GDS596] from NCBI GeoProfiles.

== Gene-level regulation ==
CCDC177 mRNA is ubiquitously expressed across adult human tissues, but is low in expression in fetal tissues throughout the body. It is also less abundant in immune cells such as B cells, T cells, and NK cells.

== Protein-level regulation ==
=== Sub-cellular location ===
Human CCDC177 contains multiple nuclear localization signals, indicating that is found in the nucleus. The protein also contains multiple nuclear export signals, indicating protein movement between the nucleus and cytosol. The locations of the various kinases phosphorylating the CCDC177 protein implicate phosphorylation in CCDC177's movement between the nucleus and cytosol.

=== Post translational modifications ===
In CCDC177, phosphorylation and O-GlcNAc modifications are predicted to occur on several serine residues, while SUMOylation occurs on select lysine residues.

The types of kinases that phosphorylate highly conserved serine residues (conserved across current CCDC177 orthologs) in the CCDC177 protein sequence are located in the nucleus and cytosol. These kinases include Protein Kinase A which is located in the cytosol and nucleus, Cyclin-dependent kinase 5 located in the cytosol, and Protein Kinase C located in the nucleus.

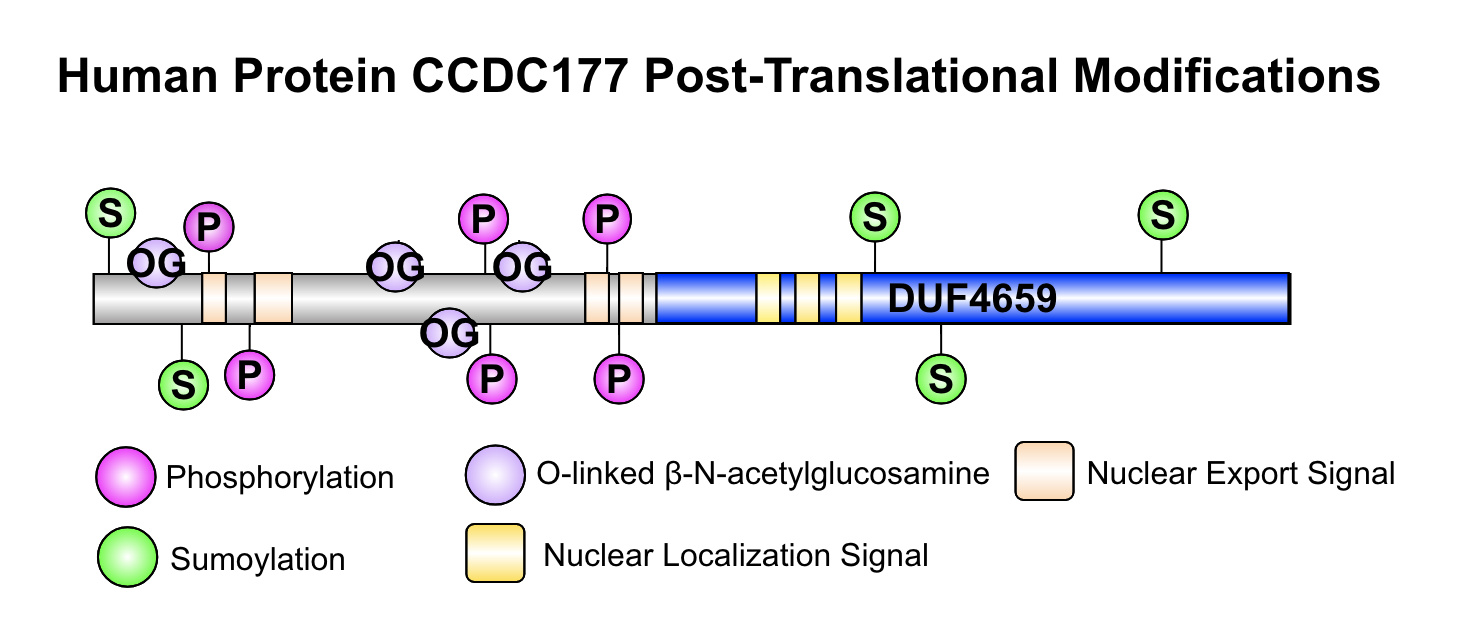
CCDC177 post-translational modifications and other notable motifs. Created using IBS-Data Visualization

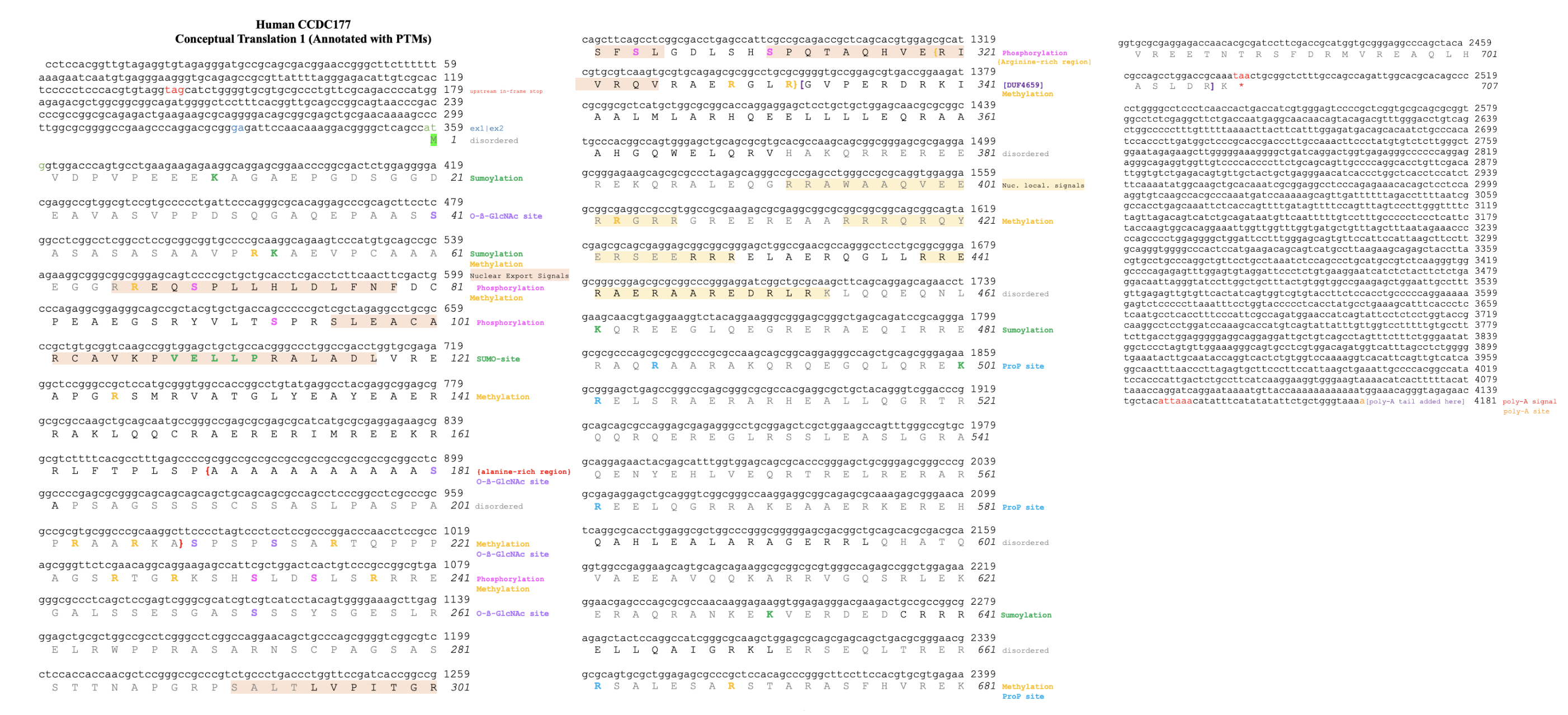
Human CCDC177 Conceptual Translation annotated with specific motifs of interest, signal sequences, post-translational modifications and other predicted domains. Labels for each annotation are found in the margins of the conceptual translation.

== Conservation ==
CCDC177 has no paralogs in humans. Orthologs are currently found in mammals, birds, reptiles, amphibians, fish, and invertebrates.

Current CCDC177 Orthologs
	Organism ("Genus Species")	Common name	Taxonomic Order	Median Date of Divergence (MYA)	Accession #	Sequence length (aa)	Sequence identity to human protein (%) ! !Sequence similarity to Human Protein (%)	
Mammals	Homo sapiens	Human	Hominidae	0	NP_001258436.1	707	100	100
	Mus musculus	Mouse	Rodentia	87	NP_001008423.2	706	90.6	94.1
	Equus caballus	Horse	Perissodactyla	94	XP_023483759.1	700	93.9	95.3
	Suncus etruscus	Etruscan Shrew	Eulipotyphla	94	XP_049626320.1	712	78.9	85.2
	Phascolarctos cinereus	Koala	Marsupialia	160	XP_020860505.1	709	73	82
	Ornithorhynchus anatinus	Platypus	Monotremata	180	XP_028920460.1	700	67.6	75.9
Birds	Gallu gallus	Chicken	Galliformes	319	XP_040527977.1	692	54.8	67.5
	Aix galericulata	Mandarin Duck	Anseriformes	319	KAI6068518.1	709	49.7	62.8
Reptiles	Sceloporus undulatus	Eastern Fence Lizard	Iguania	319	XP_042299999.1	710	52.9	68.8
	Gopherus flavomarginatus	Bolson Tortoise	Testudines	319	XP_050809463.1	714	51.7	65.3
	Python bivittatus	Burmese Python	Serpentes	319	XP_007441661.1	740	49.0	62.8
Amphibians	Geotrypetes seraphini	Gaboon Caecilian	Gymnophiona	352	XP_033808243.1	663	47.6	63.2
	Spea bombifrons	Plains Spadefoot Toad	Anura	352	XP_053330589.1	688	41.1	58.9
	Xenopus tropicalis	Western Clawed Frog	Anura	352	XP_002935376.2	679	40.6	58.6
Fish	Lepisosteus oculatus	Spotted Gar	Lepisosteiformes	429	XP_015206663.1	712	46.5	61.9
	Silurus meridionalis	Large-mouth Catfish	Siluriformes	429	KAI5102643.1	707	45.2	60.8
	Callorhinchus milii	Australian Ghostshark	Chimaeriformes	462	XP_042189074.1	710	27.8	43.6
Invertebrates	Styela clava	Stalked Sea Squirt	Stolidobranchia	596	XP_039248961.1	678	21.7	38.9
	Actinia tenebrosa	Waratah Anemone	Actiniaria	715	XP_031562596.1	712	28.0	44.4
	Orbicella faveolata	Mountainous Star Coral	Scleractinia	715	XP_020615800.1	718	25.2	40.9

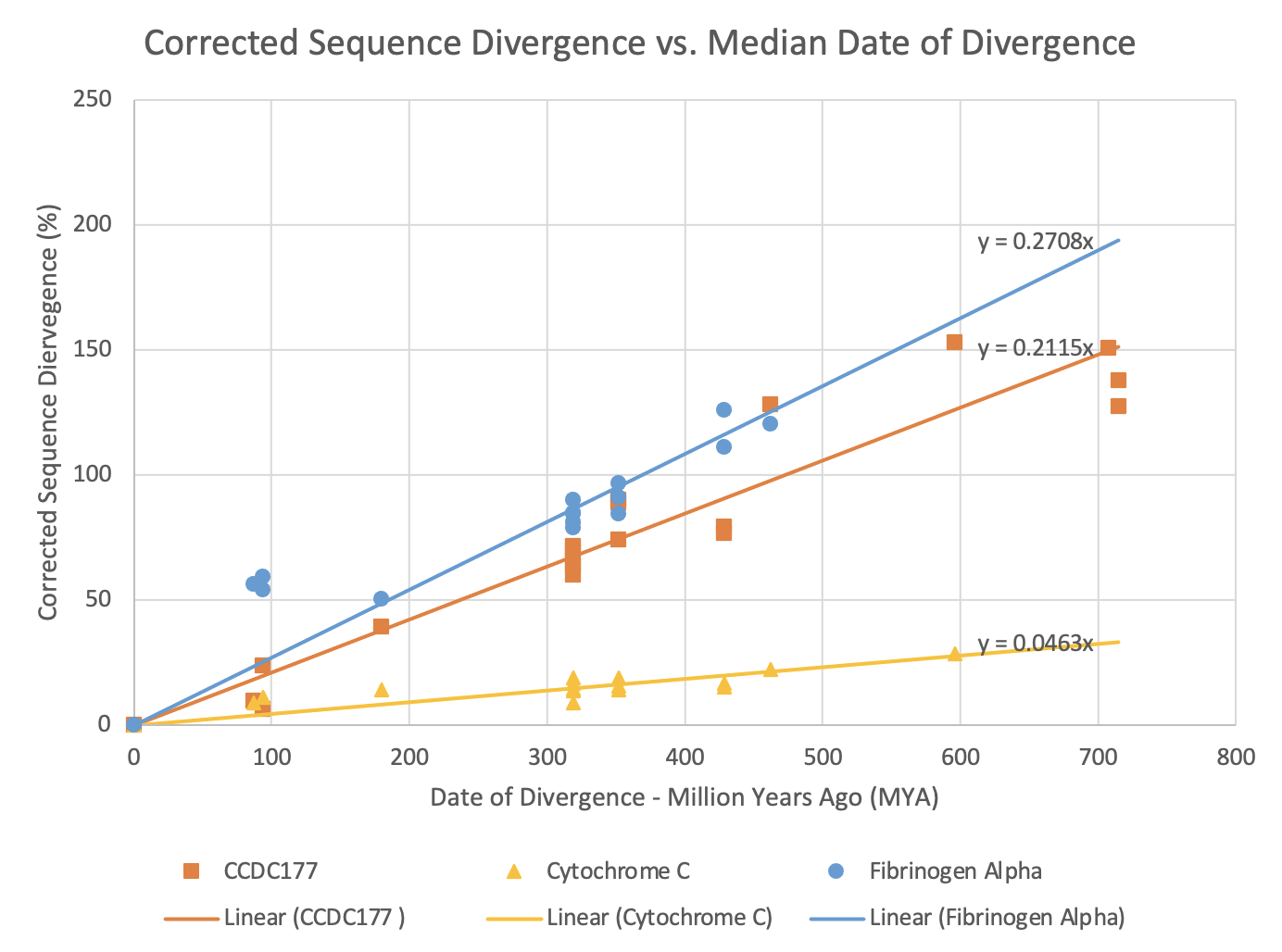
The following graph shows the rate of evolution of CCDC177 compared to that of Cytochrome C and Fibrinogen Alpha.

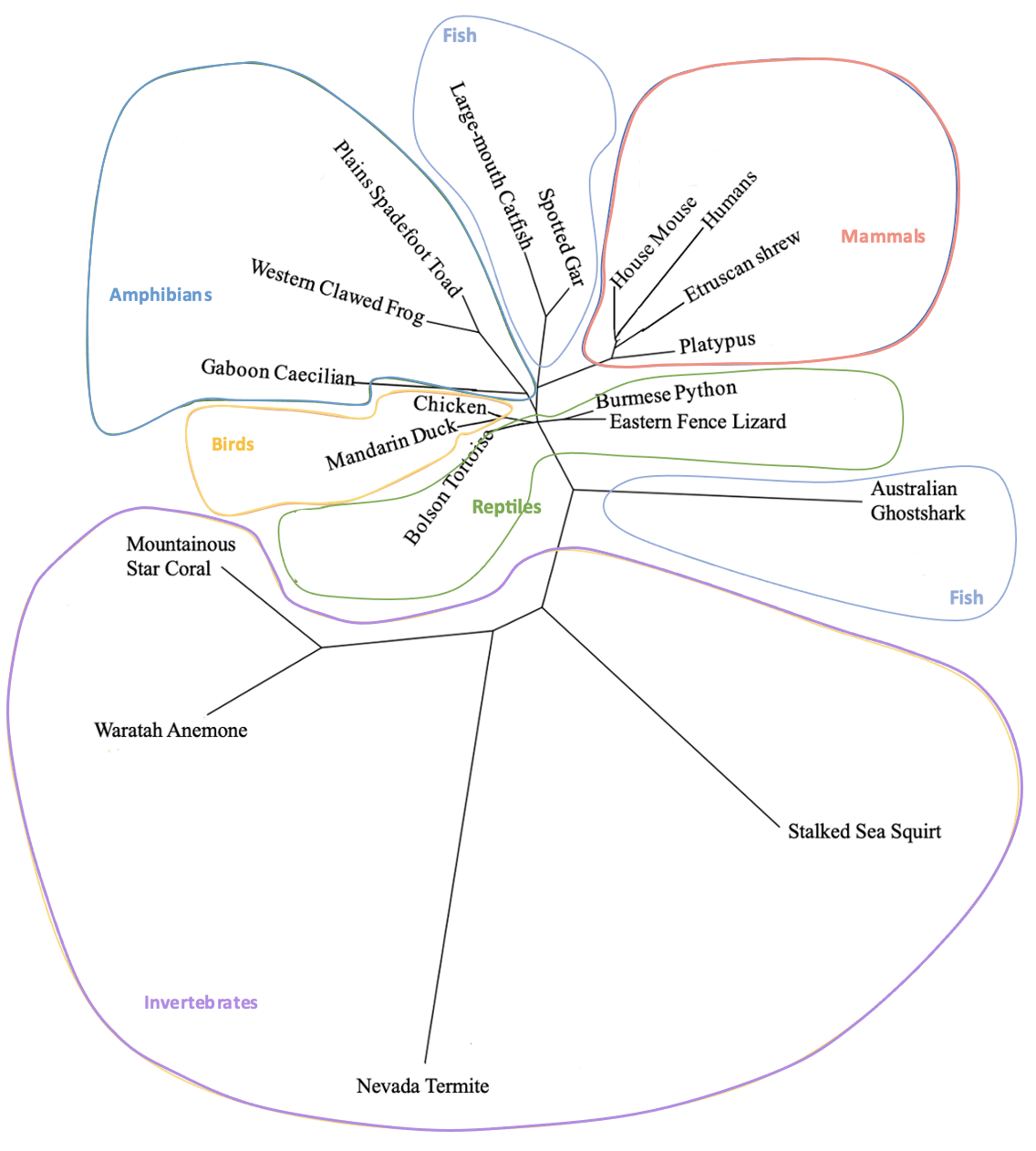
Circles indicate similar species. Made using Phylogeny.fr

=== Rate of evolution ===
The protein encoded by CCDC177 evolves twice as fast as Cytochrome c and slightly slower than fibrinogen alpha, indicating that the CCDC177 gene has a moderately fast rate of evolution.

== Interacting proteins ==
Human CCDC177 protein has notable interactions with the following proteins which are all associated with development and stem cell differentiation. All of the following proteins are located in the nucleus. These interactions implicate human CCDC177 in developmental processes and cell survival, and support its location in the nucleus.

- MYC binding protein 2 (MYCBP2) regulates neuronal growth and is required for proper axon growth.
- Forkhead box protein N4 (FOXN4) is a transcription factor required for neural development and growth. It is especially important for specifying the fates of multipotent retinal progenitors.
- Histone Deacetylase 5 (HDAC5) deacetylates lysine residues on the N-terminus tail of core histones and promotes cell cycle progression.
- T-cell acute lymphocytic leukemia protein 1 (TAL1) is an oncogenic transcription factor in T-cell acute lymphoblastic leukemia, and is implicated in hematopoietic stem cell differentiation.

== Clinical significance ==
The CCDC177 gene can be utilized to develop prognostic tumor markers for neuroblastomas, thyroid cancer, and lung cancer. CCDC177 is a methylation-driven gene in thyroid cancer, which was determined by examining proliferation and invasion of thyroid cancer (TC) cells in CCDC177 knockdown vectors. TC cells containing knockdown CCDC177 were highly proliferative and invasive.

Prognostic tumor methylation markers were discovered in human neuroblastoma as well. 78 significantly differentially methylated regions were identified from 396 sequenced tumor profiles. Methylation-specific PCR assays were also developed to determine which regions accurately predict survival outcomes. 5 of the 78 assays, including one located in CCDC177, predicted event-free survival. CCDC177 mRNA is also integral to the accurate prediction of overall survival in lung squamous cell carcinoma (LUSC) patients.

Interstitial deletions of chromosome 14 at the location 14q24.1q24.3, which includes CCDC177, are linked to mild intellectual disability, congenital heart defects, and brachydactyly. Haploinsufficiency in one or several of the deleted genes is the cause for the deletions.
