= ID3 (disambiguation) =

ID3 is a metadata format for MP3 audio files.

ID3 or ID-3 may also refer to:

- ID3 algorithm, an algorithm for constructing decision trees
- ID3 (gene), a human protein
- ID-3 format, a standard size for identification cards defined by ISO/IEC 7810
- ID3, a post-dubstep/glitch artist
- Volkswagen ID.3, a battery electric car by the German manufacturer Volkswagen
