= CBFA2T3 =

Protein found in humans

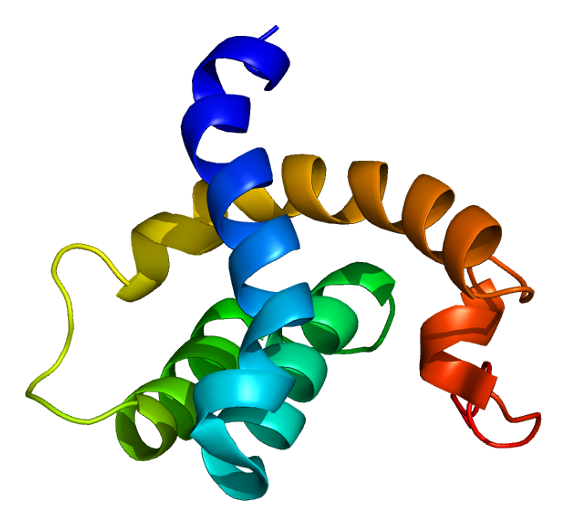

Identifiers
- Aliases: CBFA2T3, ETO2, MTG16, MTGR2, ZMYND4, RUNX1T3, CBFA2/RUNX1 translocation partner 3, CBFA2/RUNX1 partner transcriptional co-repressor 3
- External IDs: OMIM: 603870; MGI: 1338013; GeneCards: CBFA2T3

Gene location (Human)
Chr.	Chromosome 16 (human)
Band	16q24.3	Start	88,874,858 bp
Band	16q24.3	End	88,977,207 bp

Gene location (Mouse)
Chr.	Chromosome 8 (mouse)
Band	8|8 E1	Start	123,351,880 bp
Band	8|8 E1	End	123,425,848 bp
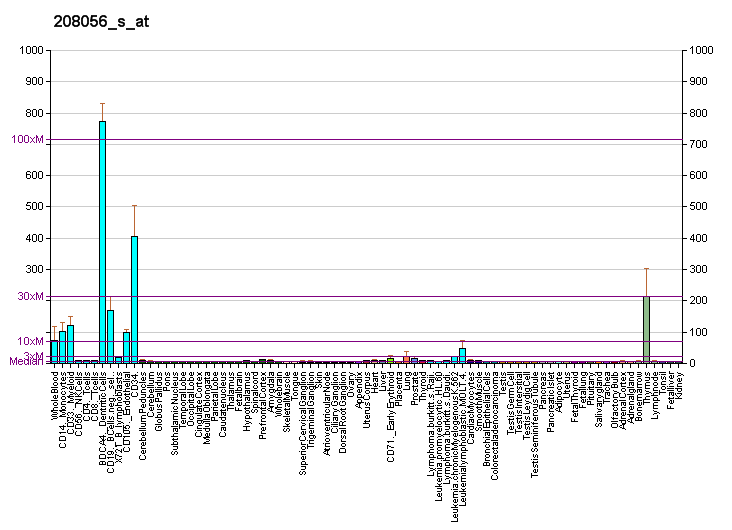
RNA expression pattern
Bgee	Human / Mouse (ortholog); Top expressed in: right hemisphere of cerebellum; thymus; apex of heart; monocyte; granulocyte; body of pancreas; spleen; right lung; paraflocculus of cerebellum; bone marrow cell / Top expressed in: internal carotid artery; external carotid artery; cumulus cell; tibiofemoral joint; aortic valve; muscle of thigh; lumbar subsegment of spinal cord; ascending aorta; thymus; blood; More reference expression data
BioGPS	More reference expression data
Gene ontology
Molecular function	DNA-binding transcription factor activity; protein binding; metal ion binding; transcription corepressor activity
Cellular component	Golgi membrane; Golgi apparatus; nucleolus; membrane; nucleus; nucleoplasm
Biological process	regulation of aerobic respiration; cell differentiation; cell population proliferation; negative regulation of glycolytic process; response to hypoxia; granulocyte differentiation; regulation of transcription, DNA-templated; positive regulation of proteasomal ubiquitin-dependent protein catabolic process; transcription, DNA-templated; negative regulation of cell population proliferation; negative regulation of transcription, DNA-templated
Sources:Amigo / QuickGO
Orthologs
Databases	NCBI: entry; OMA: entry
Species	Human	Mouse
Entrez	863	12398
Ensembl	ENSG00000129993	ENSMUSG00000006362
UniProt	O75081	O54972
RefSeq (mRNA)	NM_005187; NM_175931	NM_001109873; NM_009824; NM_177289
RefSeq (protein)	NP_005178; NP_787127	NP_001103343; NP_033954; NP_796263
Location (UCSC)	Chr 16: 88.87 – 88.98 Mb	Chr 8: 123.35 – 123.43 Mb
PubMed search
- Wikidata
View/Edit Human	View/Edit Mouse

Protein CBFA2T3 (core-binding factor, runt domain, alpha subunit 2; translocated to, 3) is a protein that in humans is encoded by the CBFA2T3 gene.

== Function ==
The t(16;21)(q24;q22) translocation is a rare but recurrent chromosomal abnormality associated with therapy-related myeloid malignancies. The translocation produces a chimeric gene made up of the 5′-region of the AML1 gene fused to the 3'-region of this gene. In addition, this gene is a putative breast tumor suppressor. Two transcript variants encoding different isoforms have been found for this gene, and a brefeldin A-sensitive association of RII-alpha protein with one of the isoforms has been demonstrated in the Golgi apparatus.

== Interactions ==
CBFA2T3 has been shown to interact with:

- HDAC1,
- HDAC3,
- LDB1,
- PRKAR2A,
- RUNX1T1 and
- TAL1, and
- TCF3.
