= ELK3 =

Protein-coding gene in humans

Identifiers
- Aliases: ELK3, ERP, NET, SAP2, SAP-2, ETS transcription factor, ETS transcription factor ELK3
- External IDs: OMIM: 600247; MGI: 101762; GeneCards: ELK3

Gene location (Human)
| Chr. | Chromosome 12 (human) |
| Band | 12q23.1 | Start | 96,194,375 bp |
| Band | 12q23.1 | End | 96,269,824 bp |

Gene location (Mouse)
| Chr. | Chromosome 10 (mouse) |
| Band | 10 C2|10 48.04 cM | Start | 93,083,276 bp |
| Band | 10 C2|10 48.04 cM | End | 93,146,997 bp |
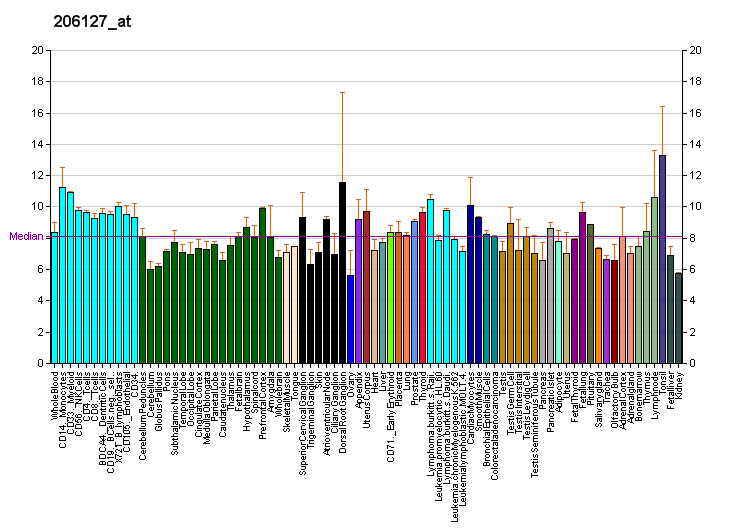

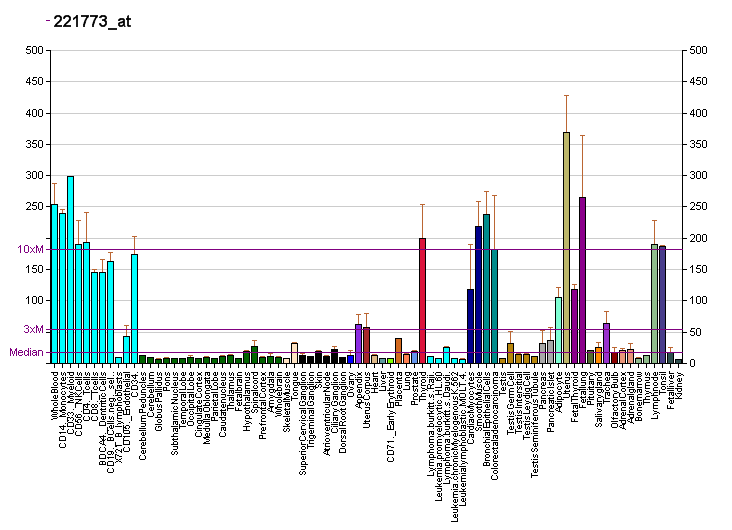
RNA expression pattern
| Bgee | Human / Mouse (ortholog); Top expressed in: bronchial epithelial cell; synovial joint; amniotic fluid; urethra; visceral pleura; vena cava; parietal pleura; oral cavity; mucosa of paranasal sinus; superficial temporal artery / Top expressed in: endothelial cell of lymphatic vessel; dermis; endocardial cushion; left lung lobe; atrioventricular valve; atrium; external carotid artery; decidua; vas deferens; semi-lunar valve; More reference expression data |
| BioGPS | More reference expression data |
Gene ontology
| Molecular function | DNA-binding transcription factor activity; RNA polymerase II cis-regulatory region sequence-specific DNA binding; DNA binding; sequence-specific DNA binding; DNA-binding transcription activator activity, RNA polymerase II-specific; protein binding; transcription corepressor activity; purine-rich negative regulatory element binding; DNA-binding transcription factor activity, RNA polymerase II-specific; DNA-binding transcription repressor activity, RNA polymerase II-specific |
| Cellular component | mitochondrion; nucleoplasm; cytoplasm; nucleus |
| Biological process | transcription, DNA-templated; cell differentiation; wound healing; regulation of transcription, DNA-templated; angiogenesis; signal transduction; positive regulation of transcription by RNA polymerase II; transcription by RNA polymerase II; negative regulation of transcription, DNA-templated; positive regulation of transcription, DNA-templated; regulation of transcription by RNA polymerase II; negative regulation of transcription by RNA polymerase II |
Sources:Amigo / QuickGO
Orthologs
| Databases | NCBI: entry; OMA: entry |
| Species | Human | Mouse |
| Entrez | 2004 | 13713 |
| Ensembl | ENSG00000111145 | ENSMUSG00000008398 |
| UniProt | P41970 | P41971 |
| RefSeq (mRNA) | NM_001303511; NM_005230 | NM_001282967; NM_013508; NM_205536; NM_001322265; NM_001322268 |
| RefSeq (protein) | NP_001290440; NP_005221 | NP_001269896; NP_001309194; NP_001309197; NP_038536 |
| Location (UCSC) | Chr 12: 96.19 – 96.27 Mb | Chr 10: 93.08 – 93.15 Mb |
| PubMed search |
- Wikidata
| View/Edit Human | View/Edit Mouse |

ETS domain-containing protein Elk-3 is a protein that in humans is encoded by the ELK3 gene.

The protein encoded by this gene is a member of the ETS-domain transcription factor family and the ternary complex factor (TCF) subfamily. Proteins in this subfamily regulate transcription when recruited by serum response factor to bind to serum response elements. This protein is activated by signal-induced phosphorylation; studies in rodents suggest that it is a transcriptional inhibitor in the absence of Ras, but activates transcription when Ras is present.

== Interactions ==
ELK3 has been shown to interact with TCF3.
