= LMO1 =

Protein-coding gene in the species Homo sapiens

Identifiers
- Aliases: LMO1, RBTN1, RHOM1, TTG1, LIM domain only 1
- External IDs: OMIM: 186921; MGI: 102812; GeneCards: LMO1

Gene location (Human)
Chr.	Chromosome 11 (human)
Band	11p15.4	Start	8,224,309 bp
Band	11p15.4	End	8,268,716 bp

Gene location (Mouse)
Chr.	Chromosome 7 (mouse)
Band	7 E3|7 57.21 cM	Start	108,737,779 bp
Band	7 E3|7 57.21 cM	End	108,774,414 bp
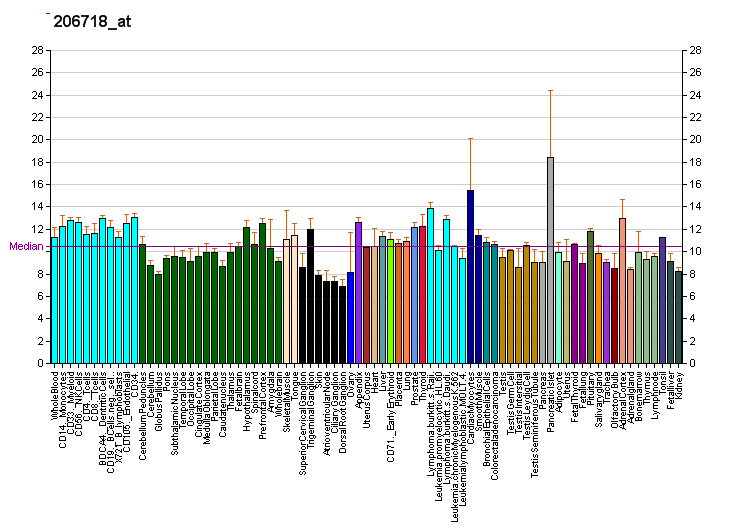
RNA expression pattern
Bgee	Human / Mouse (ortholog); Top expressed in: gonad; vastus lateralis muscle; muscle of thigh; oocyte; testicle; retinal pigment epithelium; secondary oocyte; biceps brachii; islet of Langerhans; gastrocnemius muscle / Top expressed in: medial ganglionic eminence; wall of urinary bladder; mucosa of urinary bladder; transitional epithelium of urinary bladder; primary oocyte; zygote; lip; secondary oocyte; facial motor nucleus; superior cervical ganglion; More reference expression data
BioGPS	More reference expression data
Gene ontology
Molecular function	protein binding; metal ion binding
Cellular component	nucleus; nucleoplasm
Biological process	regulation of T cell homeostatic proliferation; negative regulation of transcription by RNA polymerase II; positive regulation of transcription by RNA polymerase II; regulation of hematopoietic stem cell differentiation
Sources:Amigo / QuickGO
Orthologs
Databases	NCBI: entry; OMA: entry
Species	Human	Mouse
Entrez	4004	109594
Ensembl	ENSG00000166407	ENSMUSG00000036111
UniProt	P25800	Q924W9
RefSeq (mRNA)	NM_001270428; NM_002315	NM_001302205; NM_001302206; NM_057173; NM_001382564
RefSeq (protein)	NP_001257357; NP_002306	NP_001289134; NP_001289135; NP_476514; NP_001369493
Location (UCSC)	Chr 11: 8.22 – 8.27 Mb	Chr 7: 108.74 – 108.77 Mb
PubMed search
- Wikidata
View/Edit Human	View/Edit Mouse

Rhombotin-1 is a protein that in humans is encoded by the LMO1 gene.

LMO1 encodes a cysteine-rich, two LIM domain transcriptional regulator. It is mapped to an area of consistent chromosomal translocation in chromosome 11, disrupting it in T-cell leukemia, although more rarely than the related gene, LMO2 is disrupted.

== Interactions ==
LMO1 has been shown to interact with GATA3 and TAL1.
