= LMX1A =

Protein found in humans

Identifiers
- Aliases: LMX1A, LMX1, LMX1.1, LIM homeobox transcription factor 1 alpha, DFNA7
- External IDs: OMIM: 600298; MGI: 1888519; GeneCards: LMX1A

Gene location (Human)
Chr.	Chromosome 1 (human)
Band	1q23.3	Start	165,201,867 bp
Band	1q23.3	End	165,356,715 bp

Gene location (Mouse)
Chr.	Chromosome 1 (mouse)
Band	1 H2.3|1 75.08 cM	Start	167,516,806 bp
Band	1 H2.3|1 75.08 cM	End	167,676,310 bp
RNA expression pattern
Bgee	Human / Mouse (ortholog); Top expressed in: testicle; apex of heart; muscle of thigh; pituitary gland; anterior pituitary; gastric mucosa; left testis; rectum; right testis; subcutaneous adipose tissue / Top expressed in: choroid plexus of lateral ventricle; choroid plexus of fourth ventricle; otic vesicle; notochord; yolk sac; neural groove; zygote; neural fold; extraocular muscle; neurogenic placodes; More reference expression data
BioGPS	n/a
Gene ontology
Molecular function	protein binding; DNA binding; sequence-specific DNA binding; metal ion binding; RNA polymerase II transcription regulatory region sequence-specific DNA binding; DNA-binding transcription activator activity, RNA polymerase II-specific; DNA-binding transcription factor activity, RNA polymerase II-specific
Cellular component	nucleus
Biological process	neuron differentiation; cerebellum development; multicellular organism development; midbrain development; central nervous system development; regulation of transcription, DNA-templated; axon guidance; dentate gyrus development; transcription, DNA-templated; negative regulation of neuron differentiation; central nervous system neuron differentiation; hippocampus development; regulation of cell growth; brain development; dopaminergic neuron differentiation; regulation of gene expression; positive regulation of transcription by RNA polymerase II; synapse organization; olfactory behavior; memory; locomotory behavior; midbrain dopaminergic neuron differentiation; transcription by RNA polymerase II
Sources:Amigo / QuickGO
Orthologs
Databases	NCBI: entry; OMA: entry
Species	Human	Mouse
Entrez	4009	110648
Ensembl	ENSG00000162761	ENSMUSG00000026686
UniProt	Q8TE12	Q9JKU8
RefSeq (mRNA)	NM_001033507; NM_001174069; NM_177398; NM_177399	NM_033652
RefSeq (protein)	NP_001167540; NP_796372	NP_387501
Location (UCSC)	Chr 1: 165.2 – 165.36 Mb	Chr 1: 167.52 – 167.68 Mb
PubMed search
- Wikidata
View/Edit Human	View/Edit Mouse

LIM homeobox transcription factor 1, alpha, also known as LMX1A, is a protein which in humans is encoded by the LMX1A gene.

== Function ==
Insulin is produced exclusively by the beta cells in the islets of Langerhans in the pancreas. The level and beta-cell specificity of insulin gene expression are regulated by a set of nuclear genes that bind to specific sequences within the promoter of the insulin gene INS and interact with RNA polymerase to activate or repress transcription. LMX1 is a LIM homeobox transcription factor that binds an A/T-rich sequence in the insulin promoter and stimulates transcription of insulin.

== Interactions ==
LMX1A has been shown to interact with TCF3 and LHX3.
