= LDB1 =

Protein-coding gene in the species Homo sapiens

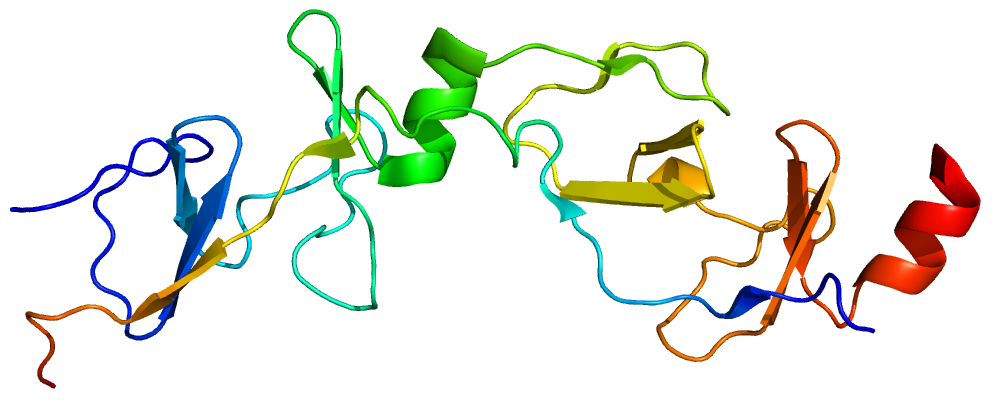

Identifiers
- Aliases: LDB1, CLIM2, NLI, CLIM-2, LDB-1, LIM domain binding 1
- External IDs: OMIM: 603451; MGI: 894762; GeneCards: LDB1
Available structures
| PDB | Ortholog search: PDBe RCSB |
| PDB | List of PDB id codes 2XJY, 2XJZ, 2YPA |

Gene location (Human)
| Chr. | Chromosome 10 (human) |
| Band | 10q24.32 | Start | 102,106,489 bp |
| Band | 10q24.32 | End | 102,120,368 bp |

Gene location (Mouse)
| Chr. | Chromosome 19 (mouse) |
| Band | 19 C3|19 38.75 cM | Start | 46,020,009 bp |
| Band | 19 C3|19 38.75 cM | End | 46,033,653 bp |
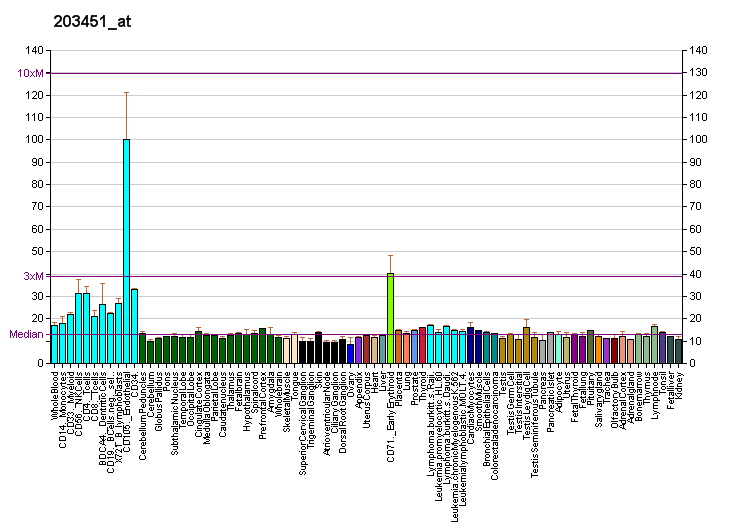

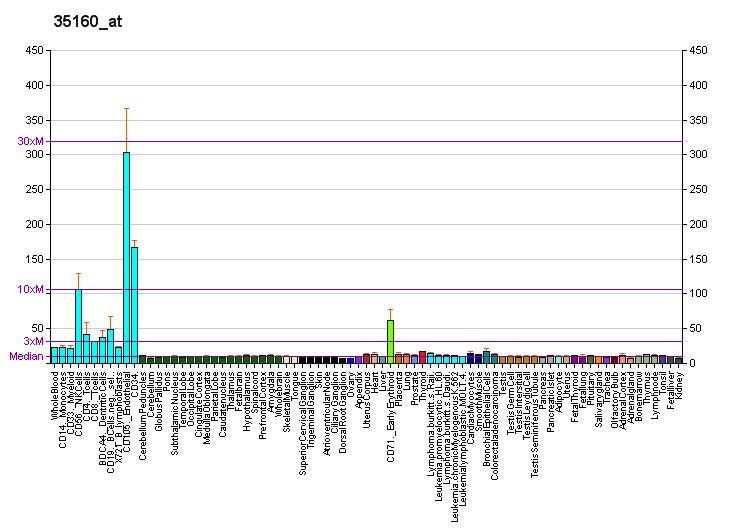
RNA expression pattern
| Bgee | Human / Mouse (ortholog); Top expressed in: right uterine tube; ganglionic eminence; left ovary; skin of leg; gastric mucosa; skin of abdomen; right ovary; canal of the cervix; sural nerve; body of uterus / Top expressed in: ventricular zone; tail of embryo; lip; genital tubercle; thymus; epiblast; yolk sac; superior frontal gyrus; dentate gyrus of hippocampal formation granule cell; neural layer of retina; More reference expression data |
| BioGPS | More reference expression data |
Gene ontology
| Molecular function | DNA binding; protein homodimerization activity; transcription corepressor activity; LIM domain binding; chromatin binding; protein self-association; protein binding; cis-regulatory region sequence-specific DNA binding; enzyme binding; transcription coregulator activity |
| Cellular component | transcription regulator complex; nucleus; cell leading edge; nucleoplasm; beta-catenin-TCF complex; protein-containing complex |
| Biological process | hair follicle development; transcription-dependent tethering of RNA polymerase II gene DNA at nuclear periphery; epithelial structure maintenance; regulation of transcription, DNA-templated; positive regulation of hemoglobin biosynthetic process; somatic stem cell population maintenance; regulation of transcription by RNA polymerase II; gastrulation with mouth forming second; cerebellar Purkinje cell differentiation; regulation of DNA-templated transcription, elongation; head development; histone H3-K4 acetylation; Wnt signaling pathway; transcription by RNA polymerase II; transcription, DNA-templated; cerebellum development; negative regulation of erythrocyte differentiation; multicellular organism development; neuron differentiation; anterior/posterior axis specification; cellular component assembly; negative regulation of transcription, DNA-templated; positive regulation of transcription by RNA polymerase II; positive regulation of cell adhesion; regulation of focal adhesion assembly; regulation of cell migration; regulation of kinase activity; regulation of hematopoietic stem cell differentiation; negative regulation of transcription by RNA polymerase II |
Sources:Amigo / QuickGO
Orthologs
| Databases | NCBI: entry; OMA: entry |
| Species | Human | Mouse |
| Entrez | 8861 | 16825 |
| Ensembl | ENSG00000198728 | ENSMUSG00000025223 |
| UniProt | Q86U70 | P70662 |
| RefSeq (mRNA) | NM_001113407; NM_003893; NM_001321612 | NM_001113408; NM_010697; NM_001360336 |
| RefSeq (protein) | NP_001106878; NP_001308541; NP_003884 | NP_001106879; NP_034827; NP_001347265 |
| Location (UCSC) | Chr 10: 102.11 – 102.12 Mb | Chr 19: 46.02 – 46.03 Mb |
| PubMed search |
- Wikidata
| View/Edit Human | View/Edit Mouse |

LIM domain-binding protein 1 is a protein that in humans is encoded by the LDB1 gene.

== Interactions ==
LDB1 has been shown to interact with other proteins such as LMO4, TCF3, TAL1 and CBFA2T3.
