= LMO4 =

Protein-coding gene in humans

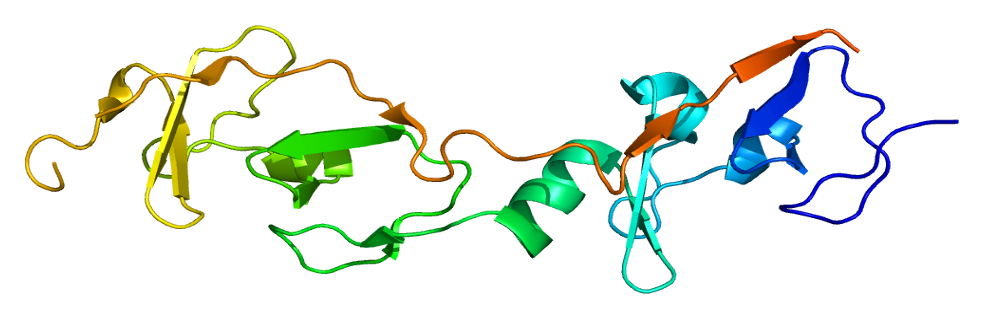

Identifiers
- Aliases: LMO4, LIM domain only 4
- External IDs: OMIM: 603129; MGI: 109360; GeneCards: LMO4
Available structures
| PDB | Ortholog search: PDBe RCSB |
| PDB | List of PDB id codes 2L4Z |

Gene location (Human)
| Chr. | Chromosome 1 (human) |
| Band | 1p22.3 | Start | 87,328,880 bp |
| Band | 1p22.3 | End | 87,348,923 bp |

Gene location (Mouse)
| Chr. | Chromosome 3 (mouse) |
| Band | 3 H2|3 68.61 cM | Start | 143,894,291 bp |
| Band | 3 H2|3 68.61 cM | End | 143,910,981 bp |
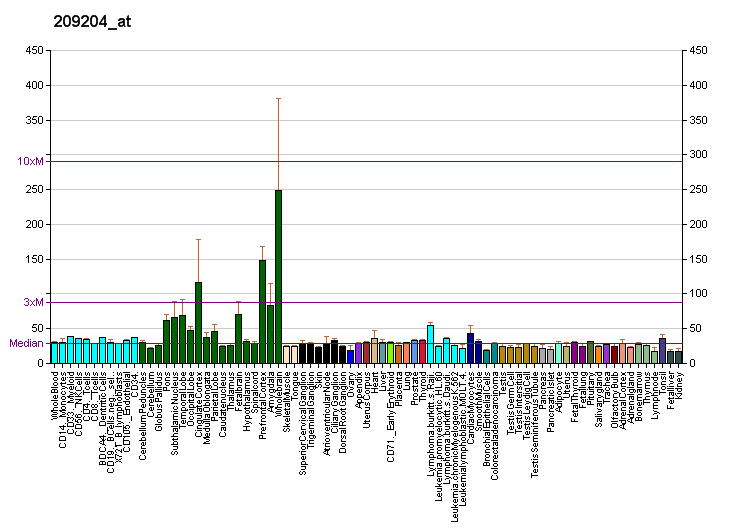

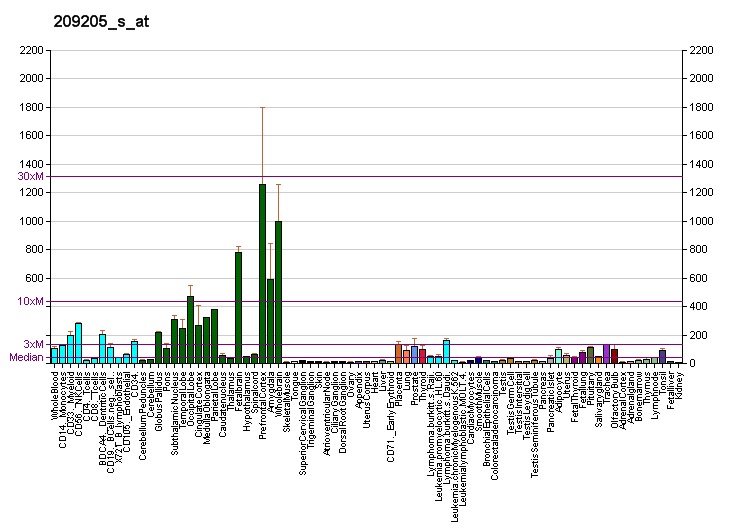
RNA expression pattern
| Bgee | Human / Mouse (ortholog); Top expressed in: dorsolateral prefrontal cortex; prefrontal cortex; Brodmann area 46; superior frontal gyrus; parietal lobe; postcentral gyrus; Brodmann area 9; frontal pole; cingulate gyrus; anterior cingulate cortex / Top expressed in: granulocyte; genital tubercle; cingulate gyrus; superior frontal gyrus; visual cortex; primary motor cortex; primary visual cortex; dentate gyrus of hippocampal formation granule cell; CA3 field; corneal stroma; More reference expression data |
| BioGPS | More reference expression data |
Gene ontology
| Molecular function | DNA-binding transcription factor activity; metal ion binding; protein binding; cis-regulatory region sequence-specific DNA binding; transcription factor binding |
| Cellular component | transcription regulator complex; cell leading edge |
| Biological process | regulation of transcription, DNA-templated; ventricular septum development; spinal cord association neuron differentiation; thymus development; negative regulation of protein-containing complex assembly; transcription, DNA-templated; ventral spinal cord interneuron differentiation; regulation of cell activation; spinal cord motor neuron differentiation; regulation of cell fate specification; positive regulation of transcription by RNA polymerase II; neural tube closure; transcription by RNA polymerase II; positive regulation of kinase activity; regulation of cell migration |
Sources:Amigo / QuickGO
Orthologs
| Databases | NCBI: entry; OMA: entry |
| Species | Human | Mouse |
| Entrez | 8543 | 16911 |
| Ensembl | ENSG00000143013 | ENSMUSG00000028266 |
| UniProt | P61968 | P61969 |
| RefSeq (mRNA) | NM_006769; NM_001369491 | NM_001161769; NM_001161770; NM_010723 |
| RefSeq (protein) | NP_006760; NP_001356420 | NP_001155241; NP_001155242; NP_034853 |
| Location (UCSC) | Chr 1: 87.33 – 87.35 Mb | Chr 3: 143.89 – 143.91 Mb |
| PubMed search |
- Wikidata
| View/Edit Human | View/Edit Mouse |

LIM domain transcription factor LMO4 is a protein that in humans is encoded by the LMO4 gene.

LIM domain only 4 is a cysteine-rich, two LIM domain-containing protein that may play a role as a transcriptional regulator or possibly an oncogene. Its mRNA is characterized by a GC-rich 5' region and by multiple ATTT motifs in the 3' region. A variant transcript missing a portion of the 5' region has been identified but cannot be confirmed because of the GC-rich nature of the region.

== Clinical significance ==
LMO4 has garnered significant attention for its involvement in cancer, particularly breast cancer. It is overexpressed in a substantial percentage of primary breast carcinomas. Studies have shown that LMO4 can promote the proliferation of mammary epithelial cells, inhibit their differentiation, and enhance cell invasion and motility, all of which are hallmarks of cancer progression.

== Interactions ==
LMO4 has been shown to interact with LDB1, RBBP8 and BRCA1.
