= MYCBP2 =

Protein-coding gene in the species Homo sapiens

Identifiers
- Aliases: MYCBP2, PAM, Myc-bp2, Phr, MYC binding protein 2, E3 ubiquitin protein ligase, PHR1, MYC binding protein 2
- External IDs: OMIM: 610392; MGI: 2179432; GeneCards: MYCBP2
Available structures
PDB	Ortholog search: PDBe RCSB
PDB	List of PDB id codes 3GBW, 3HWJ
Enzyme activity
EC #	BRENDA	ExPASy	KEGG	MetaCyc
2.3.2.33	↗	↗	↗	↗

Gene location (Human)
Chr.	Chromosome 13 (human)
Band	13q22.3	Start	77,042,474 bp
Band	13q22.3	End	77,327,094 bp

Gene location (Mouse)
Chr.	Chromosome 14 (mouse)
Band	14 E2.3|14 51.79 cM	Start	103,350,847 bp
Band	14 E2.3|14 51.79 cM	End	103,584,250 bp
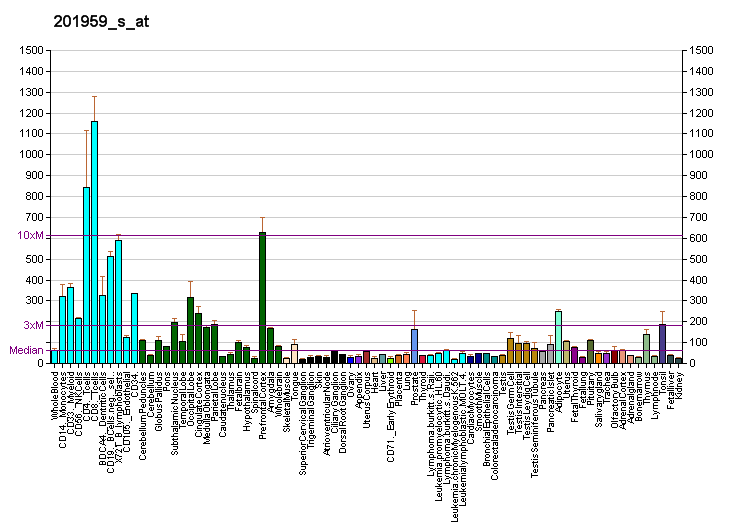

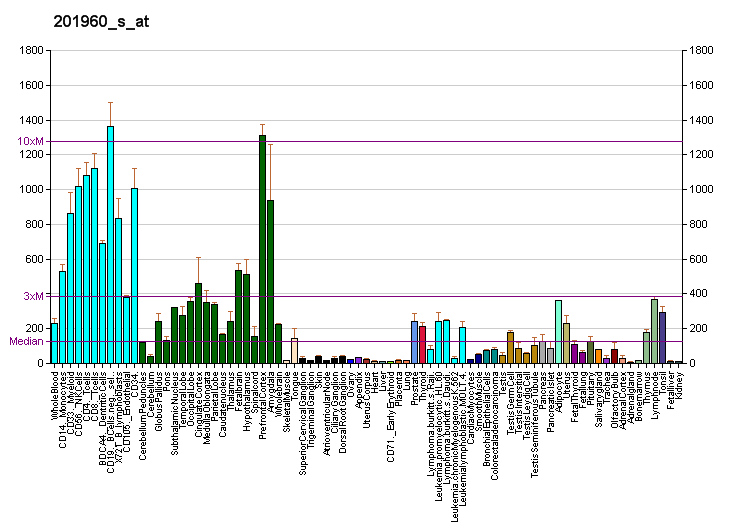
RNA expression pattern
Bgee	Human / Mouse (ortholog); Top expressed in: Brodmann area 23; middle temporal gyrus; hair follicle; lateral nuclear group of thalamus; Brodmann area 10; frontal pole; cerebellar vermis; nipple; pons; pars compacta / Top expressed in: ventromedial nucleus; anterior amygdaloid area; medial geniculate nucleus; lateral hypothalamus; lateral septal nucleus; paraventricular nucleus of hypothalamus; mammillary body; lateral geniculate nucleus; ventral tegmental area; medial dorsal nucleus; More reference expression data
BioGPS	More reference expression data
Gene ontology
Molecular function	protein binding; metal ion binding; transferase activity; guanyl-nucleotide exchange factor activity; zinc ion binding; protein homodimerization activity; ubiquitin protein ligase activity
Cellular component	membrane; nucleus; cytoplasm; cytoskeleton; microtubule cytoskeleton; axon; cell projection; intracellular membrane-bounded organelle
Biological process	regulation of transcription, DNA-templated; protein ubiquitination; transcription, DNA-templated; motor neuron axon guidance; branchiomotor neuron axon guidance; central nervous system projection neuron axonogenesis; regulation of protein localization; negative regulation of protein catabolic process; cell morphogenesis involved in neuron differentiation; neuromuscular process; regulation of cytoskeleton organization; regulation of axon guidance; positive regulation of protein ubiquitination; circadian regulation of gene expression; rhythmic process
Sources:Amigo / QuickGO
Orthologs
Databases	NCBI: entry; OMA: entry
Species	Human	Mouse
Entrez	23077	105689
Ensembl	ENSG00000005810	ENSMUSG00000033004
UniProt	O75592	Q7TPH6
RefSeq (mRNA)	NM_015057	NM_207215
RefSeq (protein)	NP_055872	NP_997098
Location (UCSC)	Chr 13: 77.04 – 77.33 Mb	Chr 14: 103.35 – 103.58 Mb
PubMed search
- Wikidata
View/Edit Human	View/Edit Mouse

Probable E3 ubiquitin-protein ligase MYCBP2 also known as myc-binding protein 2 or protein associates with myc (PAM) is an enzyme that in humans is encoded by the MYCBP2 gene.

== Structure ==
PAM contains a N-terminal leucine zipper, central MYC-binding, and C-terminal histone-binding protein homology domains.

== Interactions ==
MYCBP2 has been shown to interact with Myc.
