= BZLF1 =

BZLF1 (BamHI Z fragment leftward open reading frame 1), also known as Zta, EB1, is an immediate-early viral gene of the Epstein–Barr virus (EBV) of the Herpes Virus Family, which induces cancers and infects primarily the B-cells of 95% of the human population. This gene (along with others) produces the expression of other EBV genes in other stages of disease progression, and is involved in converting the virus from the latent to the lytic form.

== ZEBRA protein ==
ZEBRA (BamHI Z Epstein-Barr virus replication activator, also known as Zta and BZLF1) is an early lytic protein of EBV encoded by BZLF1.

=== Structure ===
ZEBRA is a homodimer. Each subunit has 245 amino acid residues. It has a basic leucine zipper domain, a characteristic of many transcription factors.

=== Function ===
==== Regulation of lytic replication ====
ZEBRA binds to the oriLyt (lytic origin of replication) of the EBV genome. It acts as an essential transcriptional regulator that is required for wild-type levels of lytic DNA replication. Binding sites of ZEBRA are at the essential upstream component of oriLyt. It interacts with the viral helicase-primase complex and BMRF1, the viral polymerase accessory factor.

==== Induction of DNA damage response ====
It has been shown to induce DNA damage response associated with the activation of EBV lytic cycle; the DNA damage response in turn allow maximal expression of lytic gene products, including ZEBRA itself and EA-D, the EBV DNA polymerase processivity factor.

== Research ==
BZLF1 expression level is used as an indicator for lytic EBV infection BZLF1 transfection is also used to induce EBV viral production.
