= TAL1 =

Protein found in humans

Identifiers
- Aliases: TAL1, SCL, TCL5, bHLHa17, tal-1, T-cell acute lymphocytic leukemia 1, TAL bHLH transcription factor 1, erythroid differentiation factor
- External IDs: OMIM: 187040; MGI: 98480; GeneCards: TAL1
Available structures
PDB	Ortholog search: PDBe RCSB
PDB	List of PDB id codes 2YPA, 2YPB

Gene location (Human)
Chr.	Chromosome 1 (human)
Band	1p33	Start	47,216,290 bp
Band	1p33	End	47,232,225 bp

Gene location (Mouse)
Chr.	Chromosome 4 (mouse)
Band	4 D1|4 52.73 cM	Start	114,913,623 bp
Band	4 D1|4 52.73 cM	End	114,928,952 bp
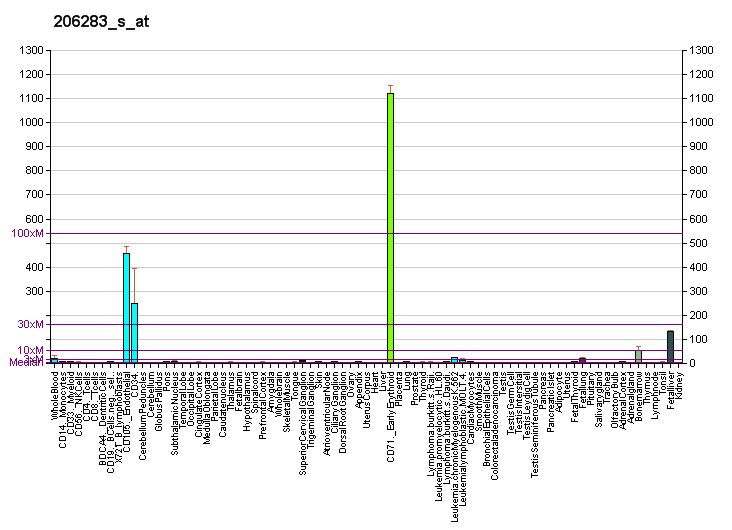

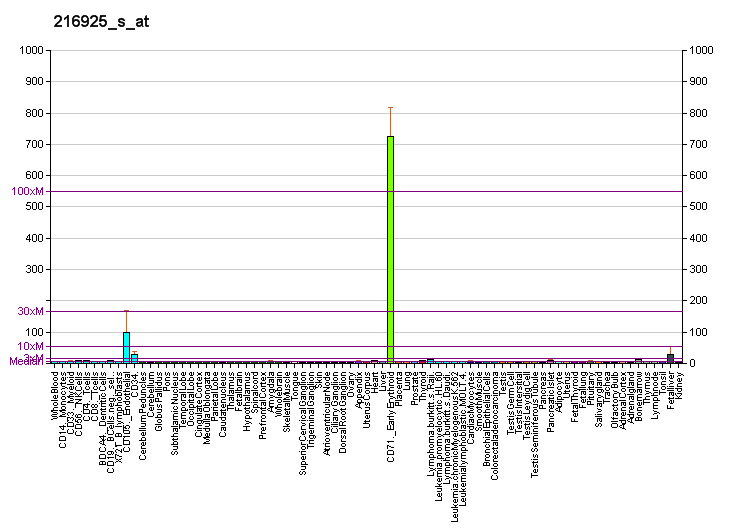
RNA expression pattern
Bgee	Human / Mouse (ortholog); Top expressed in: trabecular bone; monocyte; bone marrow; right lung; endothelial cell; blood; upper lobe of left lung; bone marrow cell; buccal mucosa cell; epithelium of colon / Top expressed in: fetal liver hematopoietic progenitor cell; tibiofemoral joint; blood; human fetus; embryo; spleen; endocardial cushion; bone marrow; yolk sac; genital tubercle; More reference expression data
BioGPS	More reference expression data
Gene ontology
Molecular function	RNA polymerase II cis-regulatory region sequence-specific DNA binding; DNA binding; RNA polymerase II transcription regulatory region sequence-specific DNA binding; protein dimerization activity; DNA-binding transcription factor activity; histone deacetylase binding; chromatin binding; transcription cis-regulatory region binding; E-box binding; protein binding; protein heterodimerization activity; enzyme binding; DNA-binding transcription factor activity, RNA polymerase II-specific
Cellular component	histone deacetylase complex; transcription regulator complex; Lsd1/2 complex; nucleus; nucleoplasm; protein-containing complex
Biological process	megakaryocyte development; megakaryocyte differentiation; myeloid cell differentiation; cell fate commitment; cell differentiation; regulation of transcription, DNA-templated; regulation of mast cell differentiation; spinal cord association neuron differentiation; positive regulation of protein-containing complex assembly; locomotory behavior; positive regulation of erythrocyte differentiation; regulation of transcription by RNA polymerase II; regulation of stem cell population maintenance; platelet formation; positive regulation of mitotic cell cycle; negative regulation of transcription by RNA polymerase II; transcription, DNA-templated; generation of neurons; basophil differentiation; positive regulation of transcription, DNA-templated; multicellular organism development; regulation of cell population proliferation; hematopoietic stem cell differentiation; astrocyte fate commitment; angiogenesis; neuron differentiation; embryonic hemopoiesis; erythrocyte differentiation; definitive hemopoiesis; regulation of myeloid cell differentiation; positive regulation of cell division; hemangioblast cell differentiation; positive regulation of transcription by RNA polymerase II; erythrocyte maturation; regulation of hematopoietic stem cell differentiation; hemopoiesis; transcription by RNA polymerase II; negative regulation of erythrocyte differentiation; positive regulation of protein tyrosine kinase activity; positive regulation of signaling receptor activity
Sources:Amigo / QuickGO
Orthologs
Databases	NCBI: entry; OMA: entry
Species	Human	Mouse
Entrez	6886	21349
Ensembl	ENSG00000162367	ENSMUSG00000028717
UniProt	P17542	P22091
RefSeq (mRNA)	NM_001287347; NM_001290403; NM_001290404; NM_001290405; NM_001290406 NM_003189	NM_011527; NM_001287388
RefSeq (protein)	NP_001274276; NP_001277332; NP_001277333; NP_001277334; NP_001277335 NP_003180	NP_001274317; NP_035657
Location (UCSC)	Chr 1: 47.22 – 47.23 Mb	Chr 4: 114.91 – 114.93 Mb
PubMed search
- Wikidata
View/Edit Human	View/Edit Mouse

T-cell acute lymphocytic leukemia protein 1 (i.e. TAL1 but also termed stem cell leukemia/T-cell acute leukemia 1 [i.e. SCL/TAL1]) is a protein that in humans is encoded by the TAL1 gene.

The protein encoded by TAL1 is a basic helix-loop-helix transcription factor.

== Interactions ==
TAL1 has been shown to interact with:

- CBFA2T3,
- EP300,
- GATA1,
- LDB1,
- LMO1,
- LMO2,
- SIN3A,
- Sp1 transcription factor, and
- TCF3.
