= TCF3 =

Protein-coding gene in the species Homo sapiens

Identifiers
- Aliases: TCF3, E2A, E47, ITF1, TCF-3, VDIR, bHLHb21, AGM8, transcription factor 3, p75
- External IDs: OMIM: 147141; MGI: 98510; GeneCards: TCF3
Available structures
| PDB | Ortholog search: PDBe RCSB |
| PDB | List of PDB id codes 2MH0, 2YPA, 2YPB, 3U5V |

Gene location (Human)
| Chr. | Chromosome 19 (human) |
| Band | 19p13.3 | Start | 1,609,290 bp |
| Band | 19p13.3 | End | 1,652,605 bp |

Gene location (Mouse)
| Chr. | Chromosome 10 (mouse) |
| Band | 10 C1|10 39.72 cM | Start | 80,245,348 bp |
| Band | 10 C1|10 39.72 cM | End | 80,269,481 bp |
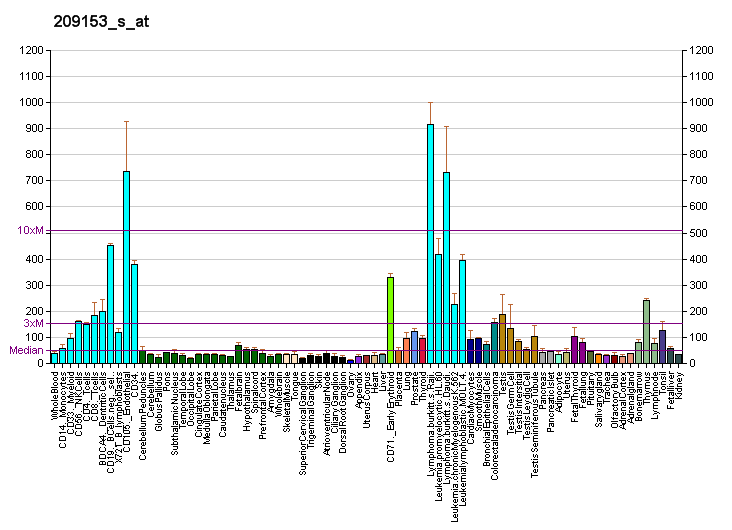

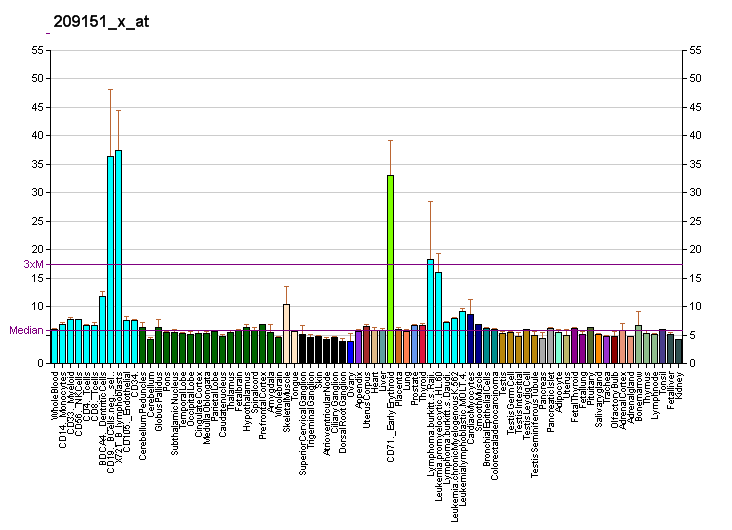

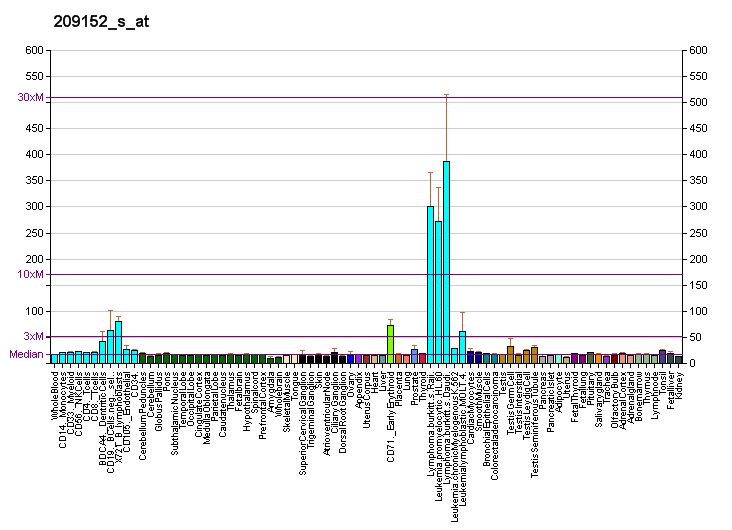
RNA expression pattern
| Bgee | Human / Mouse (ortholog); Top expressed in: ganglionic eminence; ventricular zone; right testis; left testis; pancreatic ductal cell; lymph node; bone marrow cell; gonad; appendix; stromal cell of endometrium / Top expressed in: ventricular zone; genital tubercle; tail of embryo; mandibular prominence; maxillary prominence; lip; epiblast; somite; abdominal wall; yolk sac; More reference expression data |
| BioGPS | More reference expression data |
Gene ontology
| Molecular function | DNA binding; sequence-specific DNA binding; protein dimerization activity; protein homodimerization activity; DNA-binding transcription factor activity; mitogen-activated protein kinase kinase kinase binding; vitamin D response element binding; transcription coactivator activity; transcription factor binding; RNA polymerase II cis-regulatory region sequence-specific DNA binding; DNA-binding transcription repressor activity, RNA polymerase II-specific; bHLH transcription factor binding; E-box binding; protein binding; protein heterodimerization activity; DNA-binding transcription factor activity, RNA polymerase II-specific |
| Cellular component | cytoplasm; transcription regulator complex; RNA polymerase II transcription regulator complex; nucleus; nuclear speck; nucleoplasm; protein-containing complex |
| Biological process | cell differentiation; regulation of transcription, DNA-templated; positive regulation of muscle cell differentiation; positive regulation of DNA-binding transcription factor activity; negative regulation of transcription by RNA polymerase II; transcription, DNA-templated; nervous system development; positive regulation of transcription, DNA-templated; regulation of G1/S transition of mitotic cell cycle; B cell lineage commitment; positive regulation of cell cycle; positive regulation of B cell proliferation; positive regulation of neuron differentiation; B cell differentiation; immunoglobulin V(D)J recombination; positive regulation of transcription by RNA polymerase II; regulation of hematopoietic stem cell differentiation |
Sources:Amigo / QuickGO
Orthologs
| Databases | NCBI: entry; OMA: entry |
| Species | Human | Mouse |
| Entrez | 6929 | 21423 |
| Ensembl | ENSG00000071564 | ENSMUSG00000020167 |
| UniProt | P15923 | P15806 |
| RefSeq (mRNA) | NM_001136139; NM_003200; NM_001351778; NM_001351779 | NM_001164147; NM_001164148; NM_001164149; NM_001164150; NM_001164151 NM_001164152; NM_001164153; NM_011548; NM_001378903; NM_001378904; NM_001378905; NM_001378908; NM_001378910; NM_001378912; NM_001378913; NM_001378914 |
| RefSeq (protein) | NP_001129611; NP_003191; NP_001338707; NP_001338708 | NP_001157619; NP_001157620; NP_001157621; NP_001157622; NP_001157623 NP_001157624; NP_001157625; NP_035678; NP_001365832; NP_001365833; NP_001365834; NP_001365837; NP_001365839; NP_001365841; NP_001365842; NP_001365843 |
| Location (UCSC) | Chr 19: 1.61 – 1.65 Mb | Chr 10: 80.25 – 80.27 Mb |
| PubMed search |
- Wikidata
| View/Edit Human | View/Edit Mouse |

Transcription factor 3 (E2A immunoglobulin enhancer-binding factors E12/E47), also known as TCF3, is a protein that in humans is encoded by the TCF3 gene. TCF3 has been shown to directly enhance Hes1 (a well-known target of Notch signaling) expression.

== Function ==
This gene encodes a member of the E protein (class I) family of helix-loop-helix transcription factors. The 9aaTAD transactivation domains of E proteins and MLL are very similar and both bind to the KIX domain of general transcriptional mediator CBP. E proteins activate transcription by binding to regulatory E-box sequences on target genes as heterodimers or homodimers, and are inhibited by heterodimerization with inhibitor of DNA-binding (class IV) helix-loop-helix proteins. E proteins play a critical role in lymphopoiesis, and the encoded protein is required for the B and T lymphocyte development.

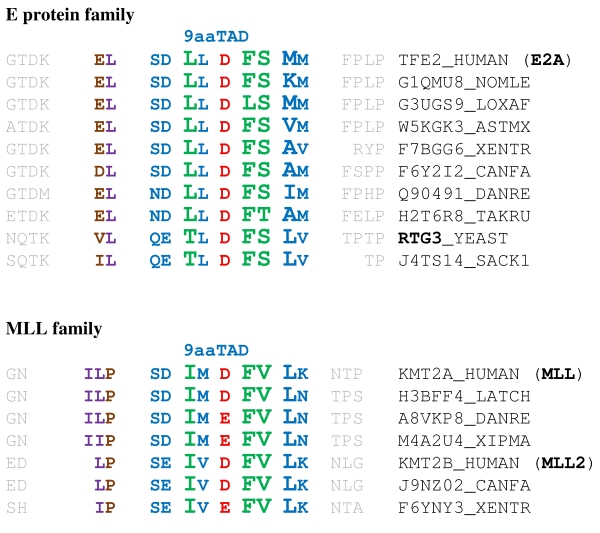
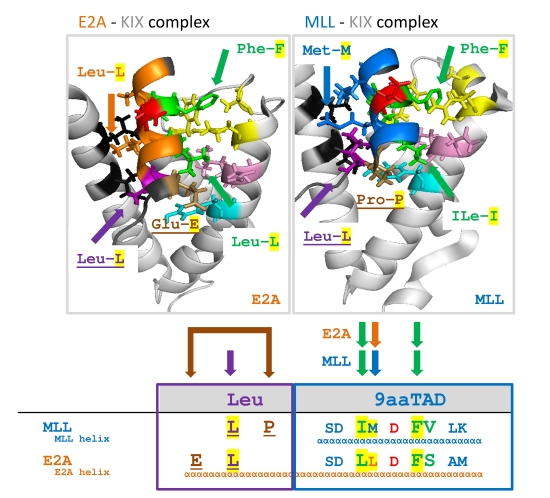

This gene regulates many developmental patterning processes such as lymphocyte and central nervous system (CNS) development. E proteins are involved in the development of lymphocytes. They initiate transcription by binding to regulatory E-box sequences on target genes.

== Clinical significance ==
Deletion of this gene or diminished activity of the encoded protein may play a role in lymphoid malignancies. This gene is also involved in several chromosomal translocations that are associated with lymphoid malignancies including pre-B-cell acute lymphoblastic leukemia (t(1;19), with PBX1 and t(17;19), with HLF), childhood leukemia (t(19;19), with TFPT) and acute leukemia (t(12;19), with ZNF384).

== Interactions ==
TCF3 has been shown to interact with:

- CBFA2T3,
- CREBBP,
- ELK3,
- EP300,
- ID3,
- LDB1,
- LMX1A,
- LYL1,
- MAPKAPK3,
- MyoD,
- Myogenin,
- PCAF,
- TAL1
- TWIST1, and
- UBE2I.
