= ID3 (gene) =

Protein-coding gene in humans

Identifiers
- Aliases: ID3, HEIR-1, bHLHb25, inhibitor of DNA binding 3, HLH protein
- External IDs: OMIM: 600277; MGI: 96398; GeneCards: ID3
Available structures
PDB	Ortholog search: PDBe RCSB
PDB	List of PDB id codes 2LFH

Gene location (Human)
Chr.	Chromosome 1 (human)
Band	1p36.12	Start	23,557,926 bp
Band	1p36.12	End	23,559,501 bp

Gene location (Mouse)
Chr.	Chromosome 4 (mouse)
Band	4 D3|4 68.34 cM	Start	135,870,808 bp
Band	4 D3|4 68.34 cM	End	135,873,066 bp
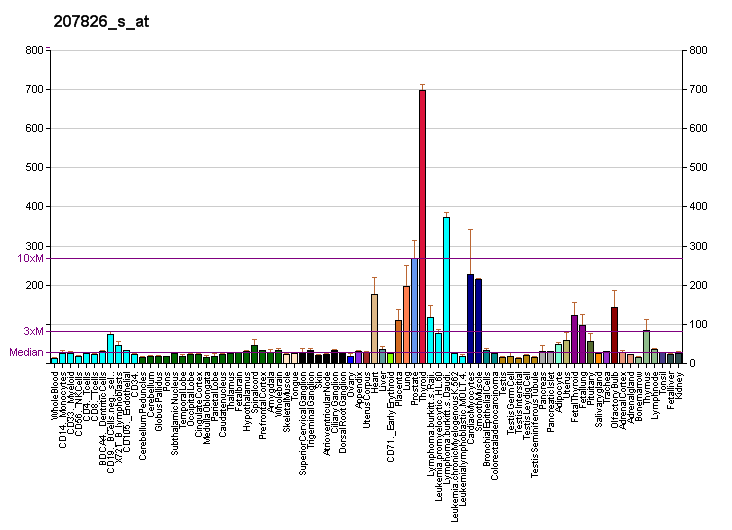
RNA expression pattern
Bgee	Human / Mouse (ortholog); Top expressed in: right lobe of thyroid gland; Descending thoracic aorta; left lobe of thyroid gland; ascending aorta; right coronary artery; popliteal artery; tibial arteries; left coronary artery; left uterine tube; right auricle of heart / Top expressed in: endothelial cell of lymphatic vessel; otic placode; endocardial cushion; body of femur; medullary collecting duct; choroid plexus of fourth ventricle; hand; seminal vesicula; optic nerve; molar; More reference expression data
BioGPS	More reference expression data
Gene ontology
Molecular function	protein dimerization activity; leptomycin B binding; transcription corepressor activity; protein domain specific binding; DNA-binding transcription factor activity; transcription factor binding; protein binding; DNA-binding transcription factor activity, RNA polymerase II-specific
Cellular component	cytoplasm; nucleus
Biological process	negative regulation of myoblast differentiation; regulation of transcription, DNA-templated; epithelial cell differentiation; rhythmic process; regulation of DNA replication; muscle organ development; notochord development; negative regulation of transcription by RNA polymerase II; negative regulation of DNA-binding transcription factor activity; negative regulation of osteoblast differentiation; transcription, DNA-templated; negative regulation of gene expression; regulation of cell cycle; odontogenesis; multicellular organism development; development of the heart; central nervous system development; response to wounding; circadian rhythm; neuron differentiation; positive regulation of apoptotic process; metanephros development; negative regulation of transcription, DNA-templated; cellular response to leptomycin B; negative regulation of DNA binding; negative regulation of neuron differentiation
Sources:Amigo / QuickGO
Orthologs
Databases	NCBI: entry; OMA: entry
Species	Human	Mouse
Entrez	3399	15903
Ensembl	ENSG00000283060; ENSG00000117318	ENSMUSG00000007872
UniProt	Q02535	P41133
RefSeq (mRNA)	NM_002167	NM_008321
RefSeq (protein)	NP_002158	NP_032347
Location (UCSC)	Chr 1: 23.56 – 23.56 Mb	Chr 4: 135.87 – 135.87 Mb
PubMed search
- Wikidata
View/Edit Human	View/Edit Mouse

DNA-binding protein inhibitor ID-3 is a protein that in humans is encoded by the ID3 gene.

== Function ==
Members of the ID family of helix-loop-helix (HLH) proteins lack a basic DNA-binding domain and inhibit transcription through formation of nonfunctional dimers that are incapable of binding to DNA.[supplied by OMIM]

== Interactions ==
ID3 (gene) has been shown to interact with TCF3.

== Repressors of ID3 ==
BTG2 binds to the promoter of Id3 and represses its activity. By this mechanism, the upregulation of Id3 in the hippocampus caused by BTG2 ablation prevents terminal differentiation of hippocampal neurons.

== See also ==
- Inhibitor of DNA-binding protein
