= Transfusion-dependent anemia =

Anemia which requires regular blood transfusion

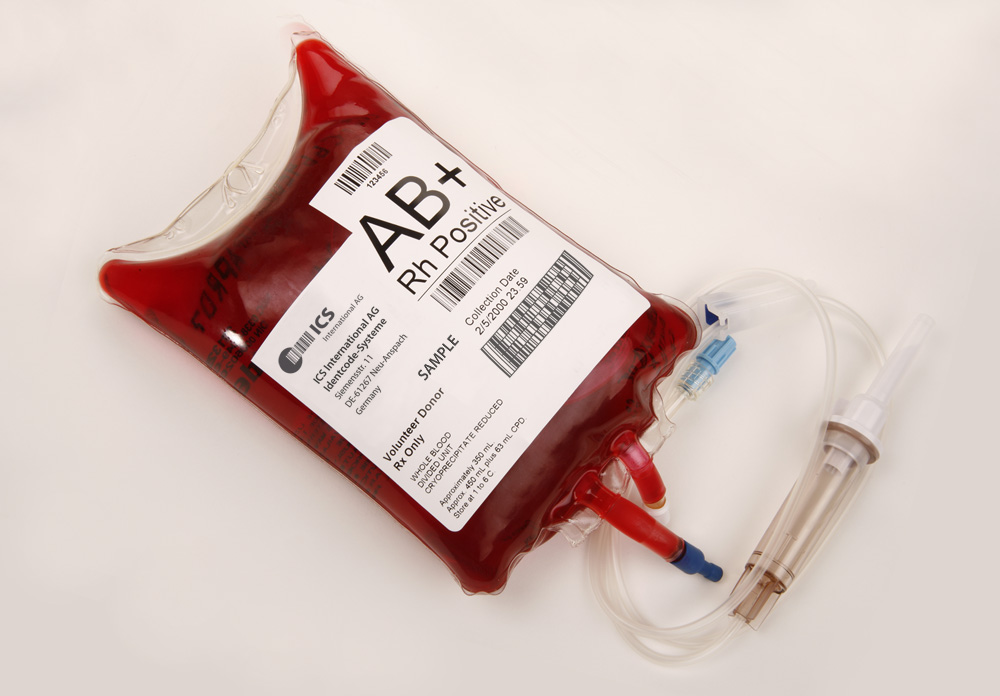
A blood bag for blood transfusion

Anemias can be classified according the severity of symptoms. Transfusion-dependent anemia (TDA) is a form of anemia characterized by the need for regular blood transfusion in order to reduce the symptoms of anemia by increasing functional red blood cells and hemoglobin count. Without this TDA patients will develop severe complications and reduced life expectancy. Various diseases can lead to transfusion-dependent anemia, most notably myelodysplastic syndromes (MDS) and thalassemia.

The transfusions alleviate the symptoms of anemia, and are used to manage the disease that causes the anemia. There is no recommended minimum hemoglobin level for transfusion dependency; a pre transfusion range of between 6 and 10 g/dL of hemoglobin may be considered, depending on the patient's individual circumstances and the severity of other symptoms.

The main complication of transfusion dependence is iron overloading, which can damage the liver, heart, bone tissue and endocrine glands. Iron chelation therapy is used to treat iron overload and common iron chelators in use are deferoxamine, deferiprone and deferasirox.

Due to the complications associated with of transfusion dependency, it is preferable to resolve the underlying cause of the anemia; but frequently this is not possible.

== Signs and symptoms ==
See more: Anemia

General symptoms of severe anemia are fatigue, shortness of breath, dizziness and heart palpitations. Other symptoms will vary depending on the underlying cause of anemia and its severity. The use of blood transfusions can ease some of these symptoms by replenishing the blood cells and maintaining healthy hemoglobin levels.

== Major causes ==
=== Thalassemia ===
==== Alpha-thalassemia ====
Hemoglobin Barts hydrops fetalis is the most severe form of alpha-thalassemia, and individuals with this disease have severe anemia in the womb before birth. It has been considered as fatal until advances in treatment were made. Patients that survive hemoglobin Barts hydrops fetalis will become transfusion dependent.

==== Beta-thalassemia ====
Beta thalassemia causes decreased functional hemoglobin production, and blood transfusions can be given to maintain a sufficient hemoglobin level. Patients with the most severe form, beta thalassemia major, develop severe anemia during the first few months after birth and require regular transfusions throughout their lives.

=== Myelodysplastic syndromes (MDS) ===
Myelodysplastic syndromes are a group of cancers in which blood cells in the bone marrow do not mature, and as a result, do not develop into healthy blood cells resulting in anemia. Severe cases require ongoing transfusions, and around 70% of people with myelodysplastic syndromes become transfusion dependent at some point.

== Diagnosis ==
TDA is a classification of the severity of disease according to the frequency of transfusion and the consequences of no treatment; as such there is no diagnostic method. There are multiple possible causes of transfusion dependency and so the underlying anemia must be diagnosed for effective treatment.

=== Myelodysplastic syndromes (MDS) ===
Between 60% and 80% of MDS patients receive transfusions. Diagnosis is difficult as a number of other syndromes give similar symptoms.Mmost patients are only diagnosed with MDS when seeking clinical advice after experiencing symptoms of anemia.

=== Beta-thalassemia ===
Beta-thalassemia is a genetic disease caused by beta-globin gene mutations. Clinical diagnosis is based on interpretation of the peripheral blood smear, which examines red blood cell morphology, followed by hemoglobin analysis and confirmed by DNA sequencing. Beta thalassemia is a continuum of anemias often divided into three classes depending on severity of symptoms: thalassemia major, thalassemia intermedia and thalassemia minor. The most severe, thalassemia major, usual manifests in early life (birth to <2 years old) and all patients are transfusion-dependent from shortly after birth in order to survive; some thalassemia intermedia patients are also regarded transfusion dependent.

== Treatment ==
=== Side effects of treatment ===
There are considerable side effects associated with the transfusion of red blood cells. The most frequent side effects is iron overload, hemolytic reactions (either acute or delayed), and infections transmitted through transfusion.

The severity of iron overload depends on the amount of blood transfused to the patient. Approximately, 200 to 250 mg of iron is transfused per unit of blood. The human body cannot excrete excess iron from frequent transfusions, leading to accumulation of iron in blood and tissues. Excess iron causes damage to important organs, such as the heart, liver, bone tissue and endocrine glands. The risk of complications due to iron overload increases with patients' ages.

==== Treatment to reduce iron overloading ====
To reduce iron overloading in blood, iron chelation therapy is commonly used together with transfusion. Generally, chelation therapy will be started if a patient's serum ferritin level exceeds 1000 ug/L.

There are three common iron chelators; deferoxamine, deferiprone and deferasirox.

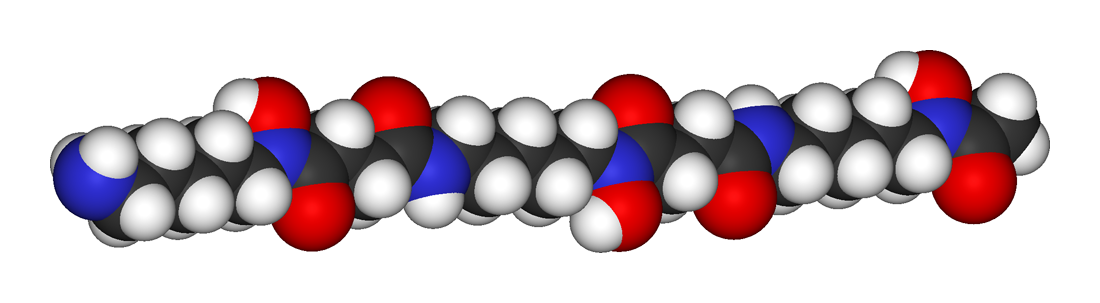
The 3D structure of deferoxamine

===== Deferoxamine =====
Deferoxamine is injected into the body through the veins and is the most traditional chelation therapy available. This therapy, although effective, especially for patients with heavy iron overload, is considered very inconvenient. The injection has to be performed over a duration of 8 hours, 5–7 times every week. Therefore, low compliance of patients is one of the major concerns of this therapy. Side effects include abnormal growth of bones and kidney damages. Deferoxamine is seldom used alone nowadays, but rather in combination with oral deferiprone to increase the effectiveness in reducing iron overload.

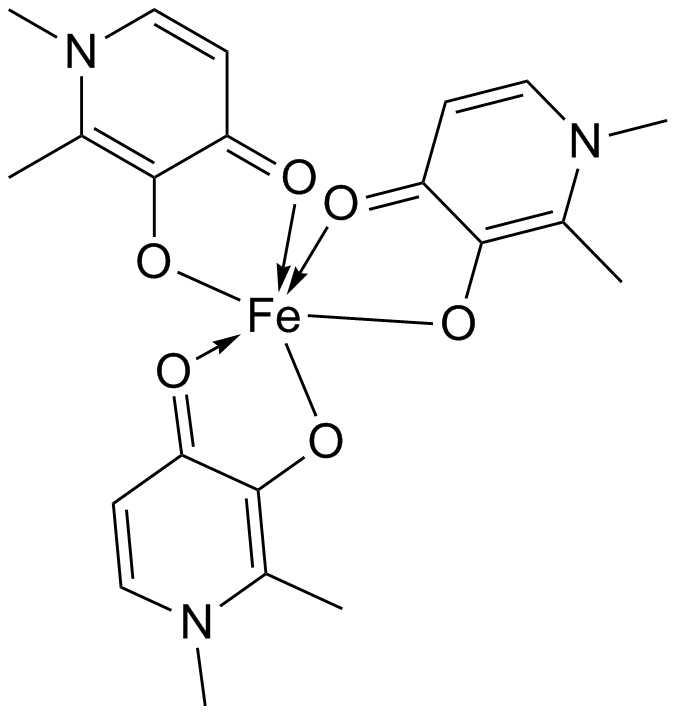
Deferiprone forms a complex with excess iron in blood in a binding ratio of 3 to 1 (3 deferiprone: 1 iron). Formation of this complex reduce iron overloading.

===== Deferiprone =====
Deferiprone is an oral drug that is ingested by patients three times a day. Although patients are still required to visit the clinic frequently for complete blood count, the administering process by simply oral intake regularly is still less tedious when compared to deferoxamine. It is also effective in reducing cardiac-related diseases due to iron overloading. Major side effects of this drug are to the gastrointestinal system.

===== Deferasirox =====
Deferasirox is also an oral drug to mitigate iron overloading taken one dose per day by patients. It shares similar benefits of convenience with deferiprone when compared to deferoxamine, but however is of the highest cost. Side effects to the gastrointestinal and urinary system are common.

Concerns have been expressed about iron chelation therapy. It can also cause skeletal changes that leads to bone disorders such as osteoporosis. Therefore, minimizing the need of transfusion when possible is still the best way in reducing iron overload.

Other than physical side effects brought by transfusion, transfusion also poses stress psychologically and financially. Inconvenience brought by frequent transfusion interferes with the normal social lives of patients. As a result, lack of social ties make patients more vulnerable to psychiatric illnesses like depression. The high cost for repeated transfusion can also cause financial burden on the patient and his/her family. Subjection to physical, psychological and financial stresses brought by frequent transfusions and its related morbidities worsen the quality of life of most patients as the disease progresses.

=== Alternative treatments ===
As there are a number of drawbacks brought by frequent transfusions, directly treating the cause of anemia (e.g. myelodysplastic syndrome), if available, remains the optimal choice of treatment. Hematopoietic stem cell transplantation is a treatment for thalassemia that can eliminate the need of transfusion in long term. However, it is not suitable for patients with organs that have already experienced certain degree of iron overload, and it may only be applicable to strong and young patients. While for transfusion-dependent myelodysplastic syndrome patients, lenalidomide is approved for treating lower-risk patients and hypomethylating agents can be used to treat higher-risk patients.

== Prognosis ==
An International Prognostic Scoring System (IPSS) is specially designed to access the prognosis of myelodysplastic syndrome patients. Scores help to classify patients into low, intermediate-1, intermediate-2 and high risks based on their severity levels. Patients in the lower-risk group generally have a longer survival range of 3–8.8 years, comparied to only 0.8–1.6 years for high-risk patients.

In general, the survival rate of transfusion-dependent anemia patients is increasing. This is due to the improvements in transfusion procedures, mature use of iron chelation therapies to reduce iron overloading, and more experiences in dealing with associated morbidities.
