= RUNX1 familial platelet disorder =

Medical condition

RUNX1 familial platelet disorder (RUNX1-FPD), also known as familial platelet disorder with associated myeloid malignancies (FPDMM), is a rare inherited disease caused by one of over 100 known variants (i.e., mutations) in an individual’s RUNX1 gene. Low platelets and dysfunctional platelets, which cause heavier than average bruising and bleeding, are hallmarks of the disorder. Individuals with RUNX1-FPD have a lifetime risk of being diagnosed with a hematologic malignancy of 35-45%.

The most common hematologic malignancy (HM) diagnosed for these individuals is acute myeloid leukemia (AML) and myelodysplastic syndrome (MDS). Additional HMs include acute lymphoblastic leukemia (ALL), chronic myelomonocytic leukemia, hairy-cell leukemia and non-Hodgkin lymphoma (NHL).

RUNX1-FPD patients often face a range of additional health issues including eczema, arthritis, psoriasis, asthma, allergies, autoimmune disorders and gastrointestinal problems.
