= Monocytic leukemia =

- Specialty: Oncology

Monocytic leukemia is a type of myeloid leukemia characterized by a dominance of monocytes in the marrow. When the monocytic cells are predominantly monoblasts, it can be subclassified into acute monoblastic leukemia.

Monocytic leukemia is almost always broken down into "acute" and "chronic":

- acute monocytic leukemia
- chronic myelomonocytic leukemia
