= CCDC92 =

Protein-coding gene in humans

Identifiers
- Aliases: CCDC92, coiled-coil domain containing 92
- External IDs: MGI: 106485; GeneCards: CCDC92

Gene location (Human)
Chr.	Chromosome 12 (human)
Band	12q24.31	Start	123,918,660 bp
Band	12q24.31	End	123,972,831 bp

Gene location (Mouse)
Chr.	Chromosome 5 (mouse)
Band	5 G1.1|5 63.85 cM	Start	124,911,482 bp
Band	5 G1.1|5 63.85 cM	End	124,939,488 bp
RNA expression pattern
Bgee	Human / Mouse (ortholog); Top expressed in: anterior cingulate cortex; amygdala; dorsolateral prefrontal cortex; hippocampus proper; primary visual cortex; superior frontal gyrus; right frontal lobe; Brodmann area 9; prefrontal cortex; hypothalamus / Top expressed in: zygote; seminiferous tubule; spermatocyte; spermatid; secondary oocyte; cerebellar cortex; primary visual cortex; superior frontal gyrus; central gray substance of midbrain; gastrula; More reference expression data
BioGPS	n/a
Orthologs
Databases	NCBI: entry; OMA: entry
Species	Human	Mouse
Entrez	80212	215707
Ensembl	ENSG00000119242; ENSG00000275035	ENSMUSG00000037979
UniProt	Q53HC0	Q8VDN4
RefSeq (mRNA)	NM_001304957; NM_001304958; NM_001304959; NM_001304960; NM_001304961 NM_025140	NM_144819
RefSeq (protein)	NP_001291886; NP_001291887; NP_001291888; NP_001291889; NP_001291890 NP_079416	NP_659068
Location (UCSC)	Chr 12: 123.92 – 123.97 Mb	Chr 5: 124.91 – 124.94 Mb
PubMed search
- Wikidata
View/Edit Human	View/Edit Mouse

CCDC92, or Limkain beta-2, is a protein which in humans is encoded by the CCDC92 gene. It is likely involved in DNA repair or reduction/oxidation reactions. The gene ubiquitously found in humans and is highly conserved across animals.

The CCDC92 gene is located at cytogenic location 12q24.31 and is 36,576 bases long with nine exons which codes for a 331 amino-acid long protein.

== Protein ==
The protein CCDC92 (Accession Number: NP_079416) is found in the nucleus in humans. It has one domain, coiled-coil domain 92, from amino acids 23-82, which has no known function. The protein is rich in histidine and glutamic acid, and is deficient in phenylalanine. It has a molecular weight of 37kDal, a PI of 9.3, and has no charged domains, hydrophobic domains, or transmembrane domains. CCDC92 has conserved predicted phosphorylation sites at S211, S325, T21, T52, T122, Y130 and conserved glycosylation sites at S183 and T244.

=== Sequence ===
mtsphfssyd egpldvsmaa tnlenqlhsa qknllflqre hastlkglhs eirrlqqhct dltyeltvks seqtgdgtsk sselkkrcee leaqlkvken enaellkele qknamitvle ntikerekky leelkakshk ltllsseleq rastiaylts qlhaakkklm sssgtsdasp sgspvlasyk pappkdklpe tprrrmkksl saplhpefee vyrfgaesrk lllrepvdam pdptpfllar esaevhlike rplvippias drsgeqhspa rekphkahvg vahrihhatp  pqaqpevktl avdqvnggkv vrkhsgtdrt v

=== Structure ===
There is a large alpha helical section near the start of the protein which extends to near the midpoint of the protein, then two smaller helical sections are near the end (see conceptual translation below).

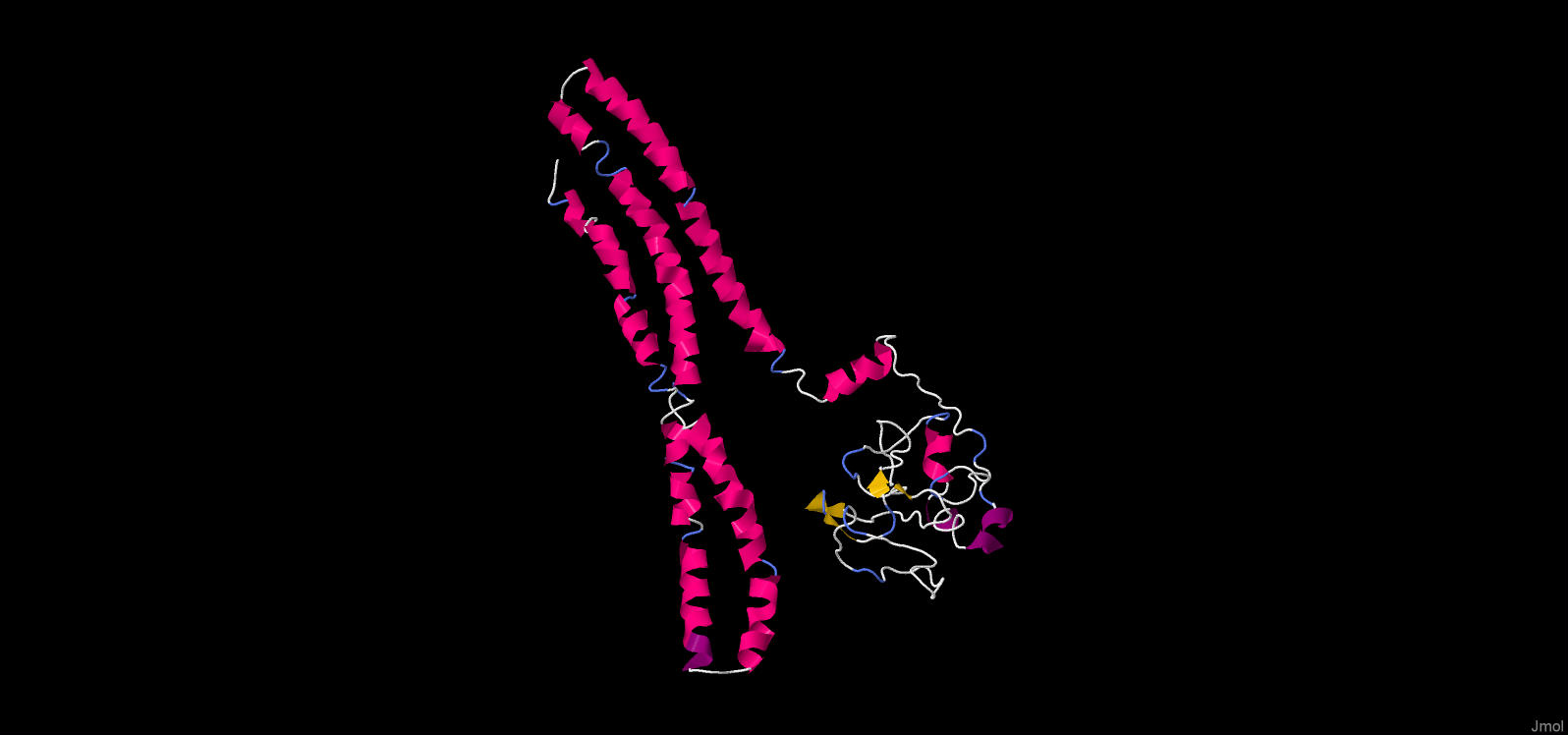
Predicted tertiary structure (I-TASSER)

The tertiary structure of CCDC92 was predicted using I-TASSER and is shown to the right. I-TASSER has moderate confidence in the reliability of this structure (C-Score of -1.61). This structure is remarkably similar to that of an antiparallel domain in the protein PcsB in Streptococcus pneumoniae. This protein is involved in cleaving the cell wall, however the antiparallel domain's function is unknown.

== Expression ==
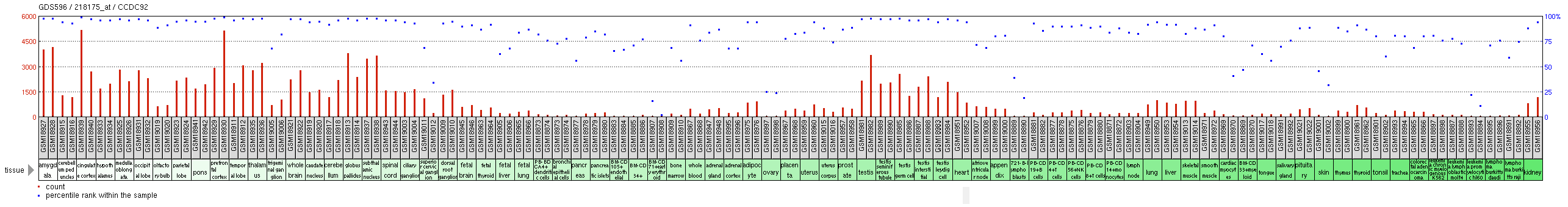
GEO Profile of CCDC92 expression in humans. The blue dots indicate the percentile at which the protein was expressed in that tissue compared with all other proteins.

In humans, CCDC92 is expressed ubiquitously at a medium to high level (shown right). In dogs and mice, it is expressed ubiquitously, however at significantly lower levels.

=== Orthologs ===
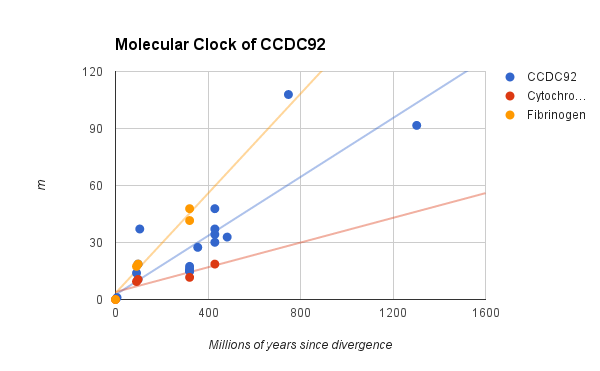
Adjusted amino acid changes per 100 (m) against millions of years since the species diverged from humans determines how quickly the protein changes. Fibrinogen and Cytochrome C are given as a reference.

CCDC92 has orthologs as far back as an acorn worm, which diverged from humans 750 million years ago. The most highly conserved domain is the coiled-coil domain 92, which is amino acids 23-83 in humans. This region has no known functions and is not present in any other gene.

CCDC92 shares a 54% similarity with the protein SPPG_05228 in the fungus Spizellomyces punctatus. Spizellomyces punctatus has an 8 amino acid stretch (LKGLHSEI) which matches perfectly with the coil-coiled domain 92 of the human variant. This sequence is present in primarily proteins which are involved in reduction/oxidation reactions, and some bind to DNA.

Taxon	Common name	Divergence date	Accession #	Length	Identity	Similarity
Homo sapiens	Human	0 mya	NP_079416	331 aa	100%	100%
Pan paniscus	Bonobo	6.6 mya	XP_003812138	331 aa	99%	100%
Mus musculus	House mouse	90.9 mya	NP_659068	314 aa	87%	92%
Ceratotherium simum simum	White rhino	97.5 mya	XP_014642670	314 aa	90%	94%
Orycteropus afer	Aardvark	105.0 mya	XP_007936428	276 aa	69%	76%
Meleagris gallapavo	Wild turkey	320.5 mya	XP_010718371	315 aa	86%	92%
Alligator mississippiensis	American Alligator	320.5 mya	KQL90045	338 aa	86%	91%
Python bivittatus	Burmese python	320.5 mya	XP_007424723	335 aa	84%	91%
Xenopus tropicalis	Western clawed frog	355.7 mya	XP_012821424	357 aa	76%	87%
Salmo salar	Atlantic salmon	429.6 mya	NP_001167260	332 aa	71%	83%
Callorhinchus milii	Australian ghostshark	482.9 mya	XP_007905974	320 aa	72%	83%
Danio rerio	Zebrafish	429.6 mya	NP_001032794	349 aa	62%	74%
Saccoglossus kowalevskii	Acorn worm	747.8 mya	XP_002731228	316 aa	34%	55%
Spizellomyces punctatus	Spizellomycetales	1302.5 mya	KNC99855	363 aa	40%	54%

== Function ==
The precise function of CCDC92 is not definitively known. However, based on interacting proteins, conserved sequences, and subcellular localization (nucleus), it can be discerned that a likely function of CCDC92 is DNA repair.

=== Interacting Proteins ===
Interacting Protein	Protein Function
CEP164	DNA UV repair
CHGB	Unknown
UCH37	DNA repair, recombination; breaks Lys-48 linked chains
RPN9	Regulatory Subunit for ATP degradation of ubiquitinated proteins
aspS	Attaches glutamate to tRNA
ppsA	Phosphorylates pyruvate to phosphoenolpyruvate
ASPP2	Regulates apoptosis
TRIM27	Mediates formation of Lys-48 linked polyubiquitin chains
ELAVL1	RNA-binding protein that increases stability; involved in embryonic stem cell differentiation

=== Clinical significance ===
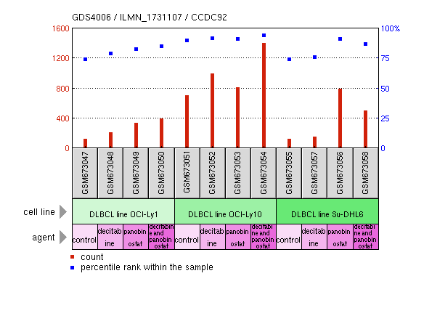
GEO Profile of GDS4006. Observes the effect of a histone deacetylase inhibitor and a hypomethylating agent on CCDC92 levels.

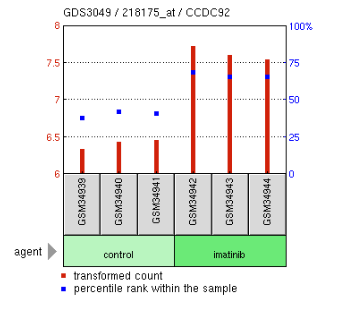
GEO profile of CCDC92 for experiment GDS3049. Observes expression levels in the presence and absence of a tyrosine kinase inhibitor (Imantinib)

In large B-cell Lymphona Lines, CCDC92 expression is increased in the presence of a histone deacetylase inhibitor (Panobinostat) or a hypomethylating agent (Decitabine). It is further increased when these two drugs are combined and increase expression by up to 10 percentiles. In leukemia cell line, CCDC92 expression is also increased in the presence of a tyrosine-kinase inhibitor, Imantinib

These two changes could be significant if CCDC92 is involved in repairing damaged oncogenes. If that was the case, any of the pharmaceuticals which increased CCDC92 expression could be used to introduce more of it into the body to find damaged DNA sequences and repair them.
