= Chronic myelomonocytic leukemia =

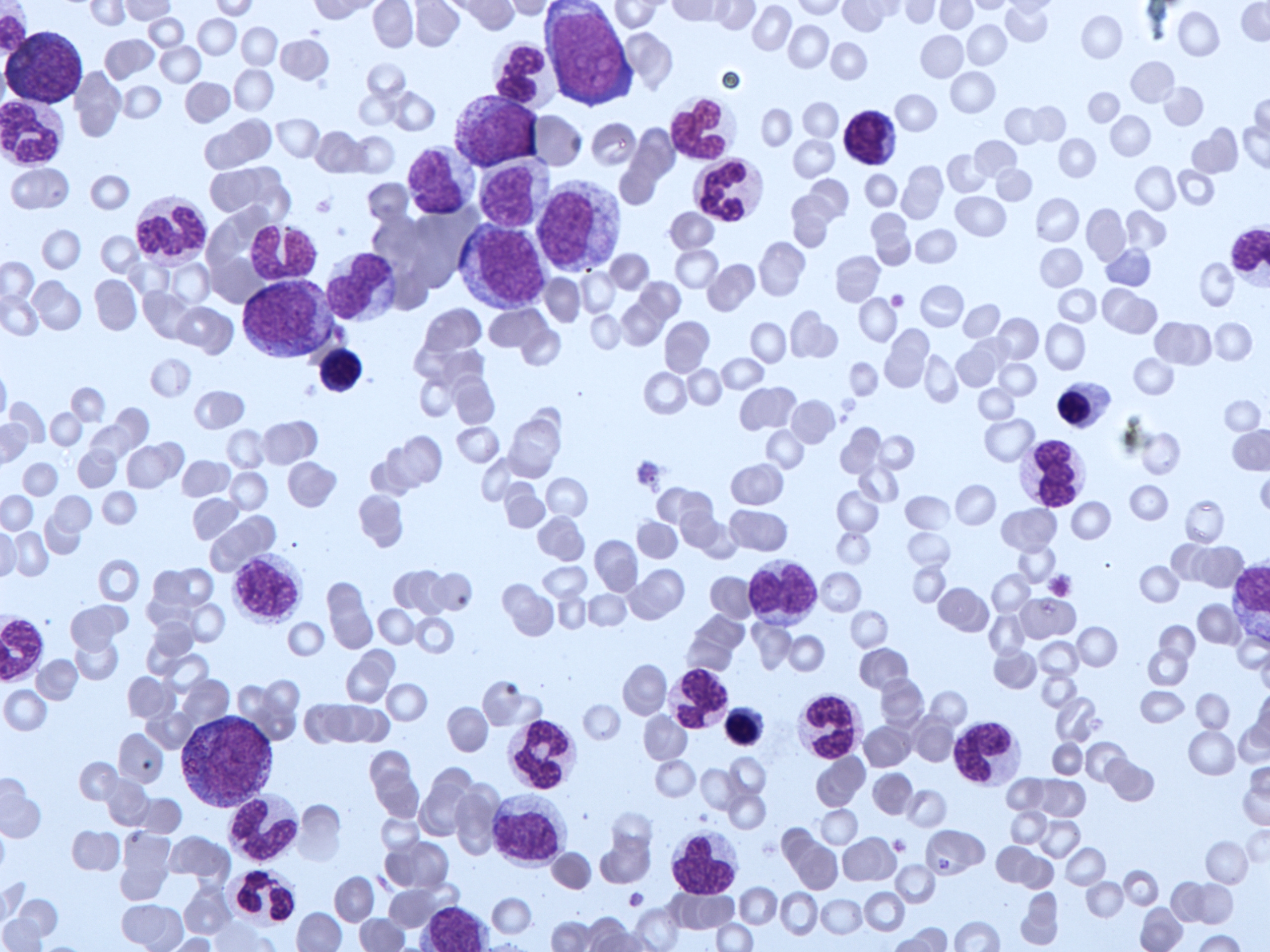
- Peripheral blood film of CMML. Monocytosis and the presence of myelocytes, metamyelocytes and promyelocytes is typical of CMML.
- Specialty: Haematology, oncology
- Causes: Environmental carcinogens, ionising radiation, cytotoxic agents
- Diagnostic method: Blood film, genetic testing
- Frequency: Less than 1 per 100,000 per year

Chronic myelomonocytic leukemia (CMML) is a type of leukemia, which are cancers of the blood-forming cells of the bone marrow. In adults, blood cells are formed in the bone marrow by a process known as haematopoiesis. In CMML, there are increased numbers of monocytes and immature blood cells (blasts) in the peripheral blood and bone marrow, as well as abnormal-looking cells (dysplasia) in at least one type of blood cell.

CMML shows characteristics of a myelodysplastic syndrome (MDS); a disorder that produces abnormal-looking blood cells, and a myeloproliferative neoplasm (MPN); a disorder characterised by the overproduction of blood cells. For this reason, CMML was reclassified as an MDS/MPN overlap disorder in 2002. For a diagnosis of CMML, the World Health Organization (WHO) states that the blood monocyte count must be >1 billion/L, no Philadelphia chromosome or mutations in the PDGFRA or PDGFRB gene should be present, the blast count must be <20% and dysplasia of at least one lineage of myeloid blood cell should be present.

Azacitidine is a drug used to treat CMML and is approved by the Food and Drug Administration (FDA) and the European Medicines Agency. Stem cell transplant is also used to treat CMML. It involves the transplantation of donor haematopoietic stem cells into the recipient. Blood transfusion and erythropoietin are used to treat disease associated anaemia.

== Signs and symptoms ==
One of the most common signs of CMML is splenomegaly, found in approximately half of cases. Other less frequent signs and symptoms consist of anaemia, fever, weight loss, night sweats, infection, bleeding, synovitis, lymphadenopathy, skin rashes, pleural effusion, pericardial effusion and peritoneal effusion.

== Cause ==
Although the cause of CMML is unknown, environmental carcinogens, ionising radiation, and cytotoxic agents may have a role in causing the disease. Approximately one third of cases of MDS with a monocyte count of >10% and <1 billion/L will progress to CMML.

== Pathogenesis ==
With a high rate of Ras mutation in CMML, deregulation of this signalling pathway has been linked to the pathogenesis of the disease. Tumour necrosis factor, GM-CSF, interleukin-3, interleukin-4, interleukin-6, and interleukin-10 may have a role in hyperproliferative CMML cells. These cytokines can stimulate the growth of CMML in vitro. Hypermethylation of cytosine residues (usually in the promoter regions of genes) occurs in many malignancies to regulate gene expression. One commonly hypermethylated gene in CMML is p15^{INK4b}, a gene involved in cell cycle regulation.

=== Genetic mutations ===
Clonal genetic abnormalities are common in CMML, but they are not specific to the diagnosis. The most common findings are the 8+, −7/del (7q) and structural 12p abnormalities. KRAS and NRAS are mutated in 25–40% of the cases of CMML. The Jak2 V617F mutation is found in 10% of cases. Mutations in transcription factors such as RUNX1, CEBPA, NPM1, and WT1 have been found in up to 30% of cases. Mutations of CBL are found in approximately 5–18% of cases. Mutations in the TET2 gene are found in approximately 40–50% of CMML. Inactivating mutations in one of the two parental GATA2 genes lead to a reduction, i.e. a haploinsufficiency, in the cellular levels of the gene's product, the GATA2 transcription factor, and thereby to a rare autosomal dominant genetic disease, GATA2 deficiency. This disease is associated with a highly variable set of disorders, including the myelodysplastic syndrome, acute myeloid leukemia, and CMML. GATA2-deficiency-induced CMML, like other types of CMML, is commonly preceded by monocytosis.

== Diagnosis ==
Blood films display a range of abnormalities. A monocyte count of >1 billion/L is essential for a diagnosis of CMML. Other features may include; leukocytosis (50% of cases); left shift and dysplasia of monocytes and granulocytes; presence of metamyelocytes, myelocytes and promonocytes; monocytes with hypersegmented/abnormal shaped nuclei, increased cytoplasmic basophilia and/or the presence of cytoplasmic granules; eosinophilia (in cases of CMML with eosinophilia); and spherocytosis (in cases of direct Coombs test, DCT, positive haemolytic anaemia). Platelet counts may be reduced, increased, or normal. Haemoglobin levels are usually reduced with normocytic and normochromic red blood cells. Autoantibodies and cold agglutinins may be present, and 10% of CMML is DCT positive. Bone marrow aspirates will display hypercellularity with increased counts of granulocytic and monocytic cells. Bone marrow core biopsies may show a predominance of myelocytic and monocytic cells, abnormal localisation of immature precursors, and dysplastic megakaryocytes. Monocytic nodules are a common feature in biopsies.

The phenotypical characteristics of CMML are; CD11b, CD11c, CD14, CD33, CD45 and CD64 seen in 100% of cases; CD13 found in 95% of cases; CD4 found in 76% of cases; HLA-DR found in 71% of cases; CD56 found in 53% of cases; CD2 found in 34% of cases; CD16 found in 29% of cases; CD10 found in 28% of cases; CD23 and CD7 found in 9% of cases; and CD117 found in 5% of cases.

=== Classification ===
Haematopoiesis. The two lineages of myeloid and lymphoid cells are formed from haematopoietic stem cells.

Leukemia subtypes are categorised into single clinical entities so they can be diagnosed and treated appropriately. Leukaemias are subdivided into lymphoid and myeloid neoplasms, depending on which bone marrow cells are cancerous. The myeloid neoplasms contain acute and chronic leukemias, myelodysplastic syndromes (MDSs), and myeloproliferative neoplasms (MPNs). MPNs are characterised by increased production of myeloid blood cells, with a higher-than-normal number of mature cells. Unlike MPNs, MDSs have a dysfunctional production of myeloid cells with a reduced number of mature cells. Many of the cells produced in MDS are abnormal-looking, known as dysplasia. CMML has characteristics of both groups and thus is a difficult disease to categorise.

==== FAB classification ====
The French-American-British (FAB) classification system was published in 1976 to classify the leukaemias. It placed CMML into the category of MDS, along with the refractory anaemia, refractory anaemia with ring sideroblasts, refractory anaemia with excess blasts, and refractory anaemia with excess blasts in transformation. The system does have clinical utility; however, factors such as cytogenetic status are not within the remit of the classification. For this reason, many disease entities in these groups show a great deal of heterogeneity.

==== WHO classification ====
In 2001, the WHO Classification of Myeloid Neoplasms was published, classifying CMML into a new group of diseases, the myelodysplastic/myeloproliferative neoplasms (MDS/MPN), reflecting the disease's neoplastic nature. Other diseases in this category are juvenile myelomonocytic leukaemia, atypical CML; BCR-ABL1 negative, and MDS/MPD unclassifiable. These MDS/MPN overlap syndromes have effective production of some lineages of blood cells, but show ineffective proliferation of other lineages. The 2008 revision of the classification moved cases of CMML with PDGFR gene translocations to a new group, myeloid/lymphoid neoplasms with eosinophilia with abnormalities of PDGFRA, PDGFRB or FGFR1.

=== Diagnostic criteria ===
==== FAB criteria ====
The FAB criteria for diagnosis are as follows:

- Monocyte count >1 billion/L
- 0–19% blasts in bone marrow
- <5% blasts in peripheral blood

The FAB also arbitrarily categorises CMML into myelodysplastic-like and myeloproliferative-like groups. A white blood count of 13 billion is used as a cut-off to differentiate the two.

==== WHO criteria ====
The WHO criteria for diagnosis are as follows:

- Persistent peripheral blood monocytosis with counts >1 billion/L
- No Philadelphia chromosome or BCR-ABL1 fusion gene
- No rearrangement of PDGFRA or PDGFRB gene
- <20% myeloblasts, monoblasts, and promonocytes in peripheral blood or bone marrow
- Dysplasia in one or more of the myeloid lineages; if myelodysplasia is absent or minimal, then a diagnosis of CMML can be made if other requirements are met and:
  - A molecular genetic abnormality is present in haematopoietic cells, or
  - Monocytosis present for ≥3 months, and other causes of monocytosis have been ruled out

WHO defined CMML has two main subsets, CMML-1 and CMML-2. CMML-1 is diagnosed if myeloblasts, monoblasts and promonocytes are <5% of peripheral blood and <10% of bone marrow. CMML-2 is diagnosed if:

- Myeloblasts, monoblasts, or promonocytes are 5-19% in the blood, or
- Myeloblasts, monoblasts, or promonocytes are 10-19% in bone marrow, or
- Auer rods are present

CMML-1 and CMML-2 can be additionally grouped as CMML-1 or CMML-2 with eosinophilia. These are diagnosed if the above criteria are met and the blood eosinophil count is >1.5 billion/L.

The presence of two or more phenotypic abnormalities can aid in diagnosis in the absence of cytogenetic or dysplastic features. These can include the expression of CD56 and/or CD2, or under-expression of HLA-DR.

== Prognosis ==
=== Factors affecting prognosis ===
CMML-2 has a reduced overall survival as compared with CMML-1, with median survivals of 15 and 20 months, respectively. Myeloproliferative CMML (>13 billion monocytes/L) has a reduced survival compared with myelodysplastic CMML. A platelet count of <100 billion/L reduces overall survival. A haemoglobin level of <10g/dL has a reduced overall survival. Some cytogenetic abnormalities have implications for the prognosis of CMML. Normal karyotypes or the single loss of the Y chromosome have low-risk prognoses. Trisomy 8, chromosome 7 abnormalities, and complex karyotypes comprise a high-risk group. Other cytogenetic abnormalities have intermediate prognoses. Somatic mutations in genes such as ASXL1 and EZH2 are associated with a poor prognosis.

CMML has a 20–30% chance of transformation to AML, a lower rate than other similar diseases. The CMML-2 subtype is associated with increased risk of transformation and ASXL1 and RUNX1 mutations also increase the risk of transition to AML.

=== Scoring systems ===
==== IPSS ====
The International Prognostic Scoring System (IPSS) was developed in the mid-1990s to assess the prognosis of MDS patients. This system stratifies cases into 2 groups: a lower-risk group (subdivided into low and intermediate-1) and a higher-risk group (subdivided into intermediate-2 and high). It uses the blast percentage, number of cytopenias, and bone marrow cytogenetics data to place cases of CMML into these groups. Due to the scoring system being developed for MDS, more myeloproliferative cases of CMML (WBC >13 billion) are excluded from the scoring system. Although the IPSS scoring system is used clinically, there is a high variability in each group. For this reason, new modalities for assessing prognosis in MDS (and CMML) are being developed.

==== MD Anderson Prognostic Scoring System ====
A new method developed using data from the M.D. Anderson Cancer Center found that a haemoglobin level of <12g/dL, total circulating lymphocyte count of >2.5 billion/L, >0% immature myeloid cells, and >10% bone marrow blasts causes a reduced overall survival. This data allows CMML cases to be stratified into low, intermediate-1, intermediate-2, and high-risk groups. These groups have median survival times of 24, 15, 8, and 5 months, respectively.

==== The Düsseldorf score ====
The Düsseldorf score stratifies cases using four categories, giving one point for each: bone marrow blasts ≥5%, LDH >200U/L, haemoglobin ≤9g/dL, and a platelet count ≤100,000/uL. A score of 0 indicates a low-risk group, 1-2 indicates an intermediate-risk group, and 3-4 indicates a high-risk group. The cumulative 2-year survival of scores 0, 1-2, and 3-4 is 91%, 52%, and 9%; and the risk of AML transformation is 0%, 19%, and 54%, respectively.

== Treatment ==
The treatment of CMML remains challenging due to the lack of clinical trials investigating the disease as its own clinical entity. It is often grouped with MDS in clinical trials, and for this reason, the treatment of CMML is very similar to that of MDS. Most cases are dealt with as supportive rather than curative because most therapies do not effectively increase survival. Indications for treatment include the presence of B symptoms, symptomatic organ involvement, increasing blood counts, hyperleukocytosis, leukostasis, and/or worsening cytopenias.

Blood transfusions and erythropoietin administration are used to raise haemoglobin levels in cases of anemia.

Azacitidine is a drug approved by the U.S. Food and Drug Administration (FDA) for the treatment of CMML and by the European Medicines Agency (EMA) for high-risk non-proliferative CMML with 10–19% marrow blasts. It is a cytidine analogue that causes hypomethylation of DNA by inhibition of DNA methyltransferase. Decitabine is a similar drug to azacitidine and is approved by the FDA for the treatment of all subtypes of MDS, including CMML. Hydroxyurea is a chemotherapy that is used in the myeloproliferative form of CMML to reduce cell numbers. Decitabine/cedazuridine (Inqovi) is a fixed-dosed combination medication for the treatment of adults with myelodysplastic syndromes (MDS) and chronic myelomonocytic leukemia (CMML) that was approved for use in the United States in July 2020.

Hematopoietic stem cell transplantation remains the only curative treatment for CMML. However, due to the late age of onset and presence of other illnesses, this form of treatment is often not possible.

== Epidemiology ==
There have been few individual epidemiological studies of CMML, due to the difficulty in the disease classification. CMML has an estimated incidence of less than 1 per 100,000 persons per year. The median age of diagnosis is 65–75. CMML has a propensity for males rather than females, at a ratio of 1.5–3:1.
