= RARS =

RARS may refer to:

- RARS (gene)
- RARS (video game)
- Refractory anemia with ring sideroblasts
- Regional Agricultural Research Station, Pattambi
- On Protecting Children from Information Harmful to Their Health and Development (RARS), Russian Age Rating System

== See also ==
- RAR (disambiguation)
