= C8H12N4O5 =

The molecular formula C_{8}H_{12}N_{4}O_{5} (molar mass: 244.205 g/mol) may refer to:

- Azacitidine
- Ribavirin, or tribavirin
