= Zinc finger NFX1-type containing 1 =

Protein-coding gene in the species Homo sapiens

ZNFX1

Identifiers
- Aliases: ZNFX1, zinc finger NFX1-type containing 1, IMD91
- External IDs: MGI: 2138982; GeneCards: ZNFX1
Enzyme activity
EC #	BRENDA	ExPASy	KEGG	MetaCyc
2.3.2.27	↗	↗	↗	↗

Gene location (Human)
Chr.	Chromosome 20 (human)
Band	20q13.13	Start	49,237,946 bp
Band	20q13.13	End	49,278,426 bp

Gene location (Mouse)
Chr.	Chromosome 2 (mouse)
Band	2|2 H3	Start	166,877,713 bp
Band	2|2 H3	End	166,904,935 bp
RNA expression pattern
Bgee	Human / Mouse (ortholog); Top expressed in: cardiac muscle tissue of right atrium; myocardium of left ventricle; cartilage tissue; nasal epithelium; skin of arm; pancreatic ductal cell; decidua; tibialis anterior muscle; saphenous vein; blood / Top expressed in: zygote; secondary oocyte; granulocyte; superior frontal gyrus; stroma of bone marrow; muscle of thigh; primary visual cortex; cardiac muscle tissue of left ventricle; primary oocyte; dentate gyrus of hippocampal formation granule cell; More reference expression data
BioGPS	n/a
Gene ontology
Molecular function	metal ion binding; DNA-binding transcription factor activity; zinc ion binding; RNA binding; DNA-binding transcription factor activity, RNA polymerase II-specific
Cellular component	nucleus; chromosome, centromeric region; nuclear RNA-directed RNA polymerase complex
Biological process	regulation of transcription, DNA-templated; regulation of transcription by RNA polymerase II; heterochromatin assembly by small RNA
Sources:Amigo / QuickGO
Orthologs
Databases	NCBI: entry; OMA: entry
Species	Human	Mouse
Entrez	57169	98999
Ensembl	ENSG00000124201	ENSMUSG00000039501
UniProt	Q9P2E3	Q8R151
RefSeq (mRNA)	NM_021035	NM_001033196; NM_001291162
RefSeq (protein)	NP_066363	NP_001028368; NP_001278091
Location (UCSC)	Chr 20: 49.24 – 49.28 Mb	Chr 2: 166.88 – 166.9 Mb
PubMed search
- Wikidata
View/Edit Human	View/Edit Mouse

Zinc finger NFX1-type containing 1 is a protein that in humans is encoded by the ZNFX1 gene.

== Clinical significance ==
ZNFX1 deficiency in humans is associated with severe multisystem inflammatory disease. Affected individuals may develop liver, lung or kidney failure, seizures and hemophagocytic lymphohistiocytosis (HLH) upon viral infections. Intermittent monocytosis is a hallmark laboratory finding in ZNFX1 deficiency. The disorder is thought to result from alterations in the half-life of the mRNA of interferon-stimulated genes (ISG) and is also associated with poorer clearance of viral infections in monocytes.
