= Juvenile myelomonocytic leukemia =

- Specialty: Oncology, hematology
- Usual onset: Under 3 years old
- Treatment: Stem cell transplant
- Frequency: One to two children out of one million diagnosed each year

Juvenile myelomonocytic leukemia (JMML) is a rare form of chronic leukemia (cancer of the blood) that affects children, commonly those aged four and younger. The name JMML now encompasses all diagnoses formerly referred to as juvenile chronic myeloid leukemia (JCML), chronic myelomonocytic leukemia of infancy, and infantile monosomy 7 syndrome. The average age of patients at diagnosis is two (2) years old. The World Health Organization has included JMML as a subcategory of myelodysplastic and myeloproliferative disorders.

== Signs and symptoms ==
The following symptoms are typical ones that lead to testing for JMML, though children with JMML may exhibit any combination of them:

- pallor
- fever
- infection
- bleeding
- cough
- poor weight gain
- a maculopapular rash (discolored but not raised, or small and raised but not containing pus)
- lymphadenopathy
- moderate hepatomegaly
- marked splenomegaly
- leukocytosis
- absolute monocytosis
- anemia
- thrombocytopenia

Most of these conditions show common nonspecific signs and symptoms.

Children with JMML and neurofibromatosis 1 (NF1) (about 14% of children with JMML are also clinically diagnosed with NF1, though up to 30% carry the NF1 gene mutation) may also exhibit any of the following symptoms associated with NF1 (in general, only young children with NF1 are at an increased risk of developing JMML):

- 6 or more café-au-lait (flat, coffee-colored) spots on the skin
- 2 or more neurofibromas (pea-size bumps that are noncancerous tumors) on or under the skin
- Plexiform neurofibromas (larger areas on skin that appear swollen)
- Optic glioma (a tumor on the optic nerve that affects vision)
- Freckles under the arms or in the groin
- 2 or more Lisch nodules (tiny tan or brown-colored spots on the iris of the eye)
- Various bone deformations including bowing of the legs below the knee, scoliosis, or thinning of the shin bone.

Noonan syndrome (NS) may predispose to the development of JMML or a myeloproliferative disorder (MPD) associated with NS (MPD/NS), which resembles JMML in the first weeks of life. However, MPD/NS may resolve without treatment. Children with JMML and Noonan's syndrome may also exhibit any of the following most common symptoms associated with Noonan's syndrome:

- Congenital heart defects, in particular, pulmonic stenosis (a narrowing of the valve from the heart to the lungs)
- Undescended testicles in males
- Excess skin and low hair line on back of neck
- Widely set eyes
- Diamond-shaped eyebrows
- Ears that are low-set, backward-rotated, thick outer rim
- Deeply grooved philtrum (upper lip line)
- Learning delays

== Genetics ==
About 90% of JMML patients have some form of a genetic abnormality in their leukemia cells that is identifiable with laboratory testing. This includes:

- 15-20% of patients with neurofibromatosis 1 (NF1)
- 25% of patients with mutations in one of the RAS family of oncogenes (only in their leukemia cells)
- Another 35% of patients with a mutation in a gene called PTPN11 (again, only in their leukemia cells).

== Diagnosis ==
The following criteria are required in order to diagnose JMML:

All 4 of the following:

- No Philadelphia chromosome or BCR/ABL fusion gene.
- Peripheral blood monocytosis >1 billion/L.
- Less than 20% blasts (including promonocytes) in the blood and bone marrow (blast count is less than 2% on average)
- Splenomegaly

At least one of:

- Mutation in RAS or PTPN11
- Diagnosis of neurofibromatosis 1
- Chromosome 7 monosomy

Or two or more of the following criteria:

- Hemoglobin F increased for age.
- Immature granulocytes and nucleated red cells in the peripheral blood.
- White blood cell count >10 billion/L.
- Clonal chromosomal abnormality (e.g., monosomy 7).
- Granulocyte-macrophage colony-stimulating factor (GM-CSF) hypersensitivity of myeloid progenitors in vitro.

These criteria are identified through blood tests and bone marrow tests.

The differential diagnosis list includes infectious diseases like Epstein–Barr virus, cytomegalovirus, human herpesvirus 6, histoplasma, mycobacteria, and toxoplasma, which can produce similar symptoms.

== Treatment ==
There are two widely used JMML treatment protocols: stem cell transplantation and drug therapy. There are four common subtypes of internationally accepted treatment protocols, which are based and clinically tested in the geographical location of the patient:

- North America: the Children's Oncology Group (COG) JMML study
- Europe: the European Working Group for Myelodysplastic Syndromes (EWOG-MDS) JMML study

The following procedures are used in one or both of the current clinical approaches listed above:

=== Splenectomy ===
The theory behind splenectomy in JMML is that the spleen may trap leukemic cells, leading to the spleen's enlargement, by harboring dormant JMML cells that are not eradicated by radiation therapy or chemotherapy for the active leukemia cells, thus leading to later relapse if the spleen is not removed. However, the impact of a splenectomy on post-transplant regression is unknown. The COG JMML study includes splenectomy as a standard component of treatment for all clinically stable patients. The EWOG-MDS JMML study allows each child's physician to determine whether or not a splenectomy should be done, and large spleens are commonly removed prior to bone marrow transplant. When a splenectomy is scheduled, JMML patients are advised to receive vaccines against Streptococcus pneumoniae and Haemophilus influenza at least two weeks prior to the procedure. Following splenectomy, penicillin may have to be administered daily to protect the patient against bacterial infections that the spleen would otherwise have protected against; this daily preventative regimen will often continue indefinitely.

=== Chemotherapy ===
The role of chemotherapy or other pharmacologic treatments against JMML before bone marrow transplant has not undergone final clinical testing, and its importance is still unknown. Chemotherapy by itself has proven unable to bring about long-term survival in JMML.

- Low-dose conventional chemotherapy: Studies have shown no influence of low-dose conventional chemotherapy on JMML patients' length of survival. Some combinations of 6-mercaptopurine with other chemotherapy drugs have produced results such as a decrease in organ size and an increase or normalization of platelet and leukocyte count.
- Intensive chemotherapy: Complete remission from a persistent form of JMML has not been possible due to a small but significant number of patients who do not display an aggressive form of the disease. The COG JMML study administers two cycles of fludarabine and cytarabine for five consecutive days alongside 13-cis retinoic acid during and afterward. The EWOG-MDS JMML study, however, does not recommend intensive chemotherapy before a bone marrow transplant.
- 13-cis retinoic acid (Isotretinoin): In the lab, 13-cis-retinoic acid has inhibited the growth of JMML cells. The COG JMML study therefore includes 13-cis-retinoic acid in its treatment protocol, though its therapeutic value for JMML remains controversial.

=== Stem cell transplantation ===
The only treatment that has resulted in cures for JMML is stem cell transplantation, also known as a bone marrow transplant, with about a 50% survival rate. The risk of relapsing after transplant is high and has been recorded as high as 50%. Generally, JMML clinical researchers recommend that a patient have a bone marrow transplant scheduled as soon as possible after diagnosis. It is predicted that the younger the patient is at the time of a bone marrow transplant, the better outcome of the procedure will be.

- Donor: Transplants from a matched family donor (MFD), matched unrelated donor (MUD), and matched unrelated umbilical cord blood donors have all shown similar relapse rates, even though transplant-related deaths are higher with MUDs due to infectious causes. Extra medicinal protection, therefore, is usually given to recipients of MUD transplants to protect the child from Graft Versus Host Disease (GVHD). JMML patients are justified for MUD transplants if no MFD is available due to the low rate of survival without a bone marrow transplant.
- Conditioning regimen: The COG JMML study involves eight rounds of total-body irradiation (TBI) and doses of cyclophosphamide to prepare the JMML child's body for bone marrow transplant. The use of TBI is controversial, though, because of the possibility of late side effects such as slower growth, sterility, learning disabilities, and secondary cancers, and the fact that radiation can have devastating effects on very young children. It is used in this study, however, due to the concern that chemotherapy alone might not be enough to kill dormant JMML cells. The EWOG-MDS JMML Study includes busulfan in place of TBI due to its research findings that appeared to show that busulfan was more effective against leukemia in JMML than TBI. The EWOG-MDS study also involves cyclophosphamide and melphalan in its conditioning regimen.
- Post transplant management: patients can experience relapse, causing treatment failure. It can be prevented by starting the patient with the withdrawal of immunosuppressants and/or begin donor lymphocyte infusion.
- Graft versus leukemia: Graft versus leukemia has been shown many times to play a critical role in curing JMML, and it is usually evidenced in a child after bone marrow transplant through some amount of acute or chronic Graft Versus Host Disease (GVHD). Evidence of either acute or chronic GVHD is linked to a lower relapse rate in JMML. Careful management of immunosuppressant drugs for control of GVHD is essential in JMML; importantly, children who receive less of this prophylaxis have a lower relapse rate. After a transplant, ongoing immunosuppressive therapy has been proven to successfully reverse the intended course of bone marrow by causing a drop in needed donor percentage as well as working to prevent a relapse. Donor lymphocyte infusion (DLI), on the other hand, does not frequently work to bring children with JMML back into remission.

== Prognosis ==
Prognosis refers to how well a patient is expected to respond to treatment based on their individual characteristics at time of diagnosis. In JMML, three characteristic areas have been identified as significant in the prognosis of patients:

Characteristic	Values indicating a more favorable prognosis
Sex	Male
Age at diagnosis	< 2 years old
Other existing conditions	Diagnosis of Noonan syndrome

Without treatment, the survival rate of children under the age of five (5) of children with JMML is approximately 5%. Only Hematopoietic Stem Cell Transplantation (HSCT), commonly referred to as bone marrow or (umbilical) cord blood transplant, is successful in curing a child of JMML. With HSCT, recent research studies have found the survival rate to be approximately 50%. Relapse is a significant risk after HSCT for children with JMML. It is the most leading cause of death in JMML children who have had stem cell transplants. Relapse rate has been recorded as high as 50%. If the first treatment was not entirely successful, many children have been brought into remission after a doctor recommended second stem cell transplant.

After bone marrow transplant, the relapse rate for children with JMML may be as high as 50%. Relapse often occurs within a few months after transplant, and the risk of relapse drops considerably at the one-year point after transplant. A significant number of JMML patients do achieve complete remission and long-term cure after a second bone marrow transplant, so this additional therapy should always be considered for children who relapse.

== Frequency ==
JMML accounts for 1–2% of childhood leukemias each year; in the United States, an estimated 25-50 new cases are diagnosed each year, which also equates to about 3 cases per million children. There is no known environmental cause for JMML. Since about 10% of patients are diagnosed before three months of age, it is thought that JMML is a congenital condition in these infants.

== History ==
Juvenile myelomonocytic leukemia (JMML) is a myelodysplastic and myeloproliferative disorder. The diagnostic criteria were originally laid down by Neimeyer et al. in 1997 and 1998 and were incorporated in the WHO classification in 2008.

== See also ==
- List of cutaneous conditions
- Hematologic disease
- List of cancer types
