= Decitabine/cedazuridine =

Medication

Combination of
- Decitabine: Nucleoside metabolic inhibitor
- Cedazuridine: Cytidine deaminase inhibitor

Clinical data
- Trade names: Inqovi, Inaqovi
- Other names: ASTX727, C-DEC
- AHFS/Drugs.com: Monograph
- MedlinePlus: a620050
- License data: US DailyMed: Cedazuridine and decitabine
- Pregnancy category: AU: X (High risk); Not recommended
- Routes of administration: By mouth
- ATC code: None

Legal status
- Legal status: AU: S4 (Prescription only); CA: ℞-only; US: ℞-only; EU: Rx-only

Identifiers
- CAS Number: 2133902-17-5
- KEGG: D11848

Decitabine/cedazuridine, sold under the brand name Inqovi among others, is a fixed-dose combination anticancer medication used for the treatment of adults with myelodysplastic syndromes and chronic myelomonocytic leukemia (CMML). It is a combination of decitabine, a nucleoside metabolic inhibitor, and cedazuridine, a cytidine deaminase inhibitor.

The most common side effects of decitabine/cedazuridine include fatigue, constipation, hemorrhage, muscle pain (myalgia), mucositis (mouth sores), arthralgia (joint pain), nausea, dyspnea, diarrhea, rash, dizziness, fever with low white blood cell count (febrile neutropenia), edema, headache, cough, decreased appetite, upper respiratory tract infection, pneumonia, and transaminase increased. The combination can cause fetal harm. It is taken by mouth.

Decitabine/cedazuridine was approved for medical use in the United States and Canada in July 2020, and in the European Union in September 2023.

== Medical uses ==
Decitabine/cedazuridine is indicated for treatment of adults with myelodysplastic syndromes, including previously treated and untreated, de novo and secondary myelodysplastic syndromes with the following French American-British subtypes (refractory anemia, refractory anemia with ringed sideroblasts, refractory anemia with excess blasts, and chronic myelomonocytic leukemia) and intermediate-1, intermediate-2, and high-risk International Prognostic Scoring System groups.

Myelodysplastic syndromes is a type of blood cancer in which blood cells in the bone marrow are defective leading to a low number of one or more types of blood cells.

== History ==
Decitabine/cedazuridine was approved for medical use in the United States and Canada in July 2020, and in the European Union in September 2023.

The U.S. Food and Drug Administration (FDA) granted the application of decitabine combined with cedazuridine priority review and orphan drug designation. The orphan drug designation was granted in August 2019 for the treatment of myelodysplastic syndromes (including chronic myelomonocytic leukemia).

Decitabine combined with cedazuridine was investigated in two open-label, randomized, crossover trials. Trial ASTX727-01-B (NCT02103478) included 80 adult participants with myelodysplastic syndromes (International Prognostic Scoring System [IPSS] Intermediate-1, Intermediate-2, or high-risk) or chronic myelomonocytic leukemia and trial ASTX727-02 (NCT03306264) included 133 adult participants with myelodysplastic syndromes or chronic myelomonocytic leukemia, including all French-American-British classification criteria and IPSS Intermediate-1, Intermediate-2, or high-risk prognostic scores. The trials were conducted at 51 sites in the United States and Canada.

In both trials, participants were randomized 1:1 to receive decitabine combined with cedazuridine (35 mg decitabine and 100 mg cedazuridine) by mouth in cycle 1 and decitabine 20 mg/m2 intravenously in cycle 2 or the reverse sequence. Both decitabine combined with cedazuridine and intravenous decitabine were administered once daily on days 1 through 5 of a 28-day cycle. Starting with cycle 3, all participants received decitabine combined with cedazuridine by mouth once daily on days 1 through 5 of each 28-day cycle until disease progression or unacceptable toxicity. Both trials provided comparison of exposure and safety in the first two cycles between oral decitabine combined with cedazuridine and intravenous decitabine and description of disease response with decitabine combined with cedazuridine. Comparison of disease response between the decitabine combined with cedazuridine and intravenous decitabine was not possible because all participants received decitabine combined with cedazuridine starting from Cycle 3.

The FDA approval of decitabine combined with cedazuridine was based on clinical trial results which showed similar drug concentrations between intravenous decitabine and decitabine combined with cedazuridine. Additionally, about half of the participants who were formerly dependent on transfusions were able to no longer require transfusions during an 8-week period. The safety profile of decitabine combined with cedazuridine was also similar to intravenous decitabine. The FDA granted the approval of Inqovi to Astex Pharmaceuticals, Inc., a subsidiary of Otsuka Pharmaceutical Co. Ltd.
