= Atypical localization of immature precursors =

In hematology, atypical localization of immature precursors (ALIP) refers to finding of atypically localized precursors (myeloblasts and promyelocytes) on bone marrow biopsy. In healthy humans, precursors are rare and are found localized near the endosteum, and consist of 1–2 cells. In some cases of myelodysplastic syndromes (MDS), immature precursors might be located in the intertrabecular region and occasionally aggregate as clusters of 3–5 cells. The presence of ALIPs is associated with worse prognosis of MDS. Recently, in bone marrow sections of patients with acute myeloid leukemia cells similar to ALIPs were defined as ALIP-like clusters. The presence of ALIP-like clusters in AML patients within remission was reported to be associated with early relapse of the disease.
