= Monocytosis =

Increase in the number of monocytes circulating in the blood

- Specialty: Hematology

Monocytosis is an increase in the number of monocytes circulating in the blood. Monocytes are white blood cells that give rise to macrophages and dendritic cells in the immune system.

In humans, monocytosis occurs when there is a sustained rise in monocyte counts greater than 800/mm^{3} to 1000/mm^{3}.

Monocytosis has sometimes been called mononucleosis, but that name is usually reserved specifically for infectious mononucleosis.

== Causes ==
Monocytosis often occurs during chronic inflammation. Diseases that produce such a chronic inflammatory state:

- Infections: tuberculosis, brucellosis, listeriosis, subacute bacterial endocarditis, syphilis, and other viral infections and many protozoal and rickettsial infections (e.g. kala azar, malaria, Rocky Mountain spotted fever).
- Blood and immune causes: chronic neutropenia and myeloproliferative disorders.
- Autoimmune diseases, immune diseases and vasculitis: systemic lupus erythematosus, rheumatoid arthritis and inflammatory bowel disease. Monocytosis can be a symptom of mast cell activation syndrome (MCAS).
- Malignancies: Hodgkin's disease and certain leukaemias, such as chronic myelomonocytic leukaemia (CMML) and monocytic leukemia.
- Recovery phase of neutropenia or an acute infection.
- Obesity (cf. Nagareddy et al. (2014), Cell Metabolism, Vol. 19, pp 821–835)
- Miscellaneous causes: sarcoidosis, drug overdose, lipid storage disease and ZNFX1 deficiency.

During these stages of extreme inflammation, monocytosis can damage tissues because it increases the activation of the immune response and prevents the inflammation from subsiding which is seen in cases where sepsis occurs.

== Diagnosis ==
- Blood Test (CBC) (Normal range of Monocytes: 1-10%) (Normal range in males: 0.2-0.8 × 10^{3}/microliter)
- Blood test checking for monocytosis (Abnormal ranges: >10%) (Abnormal range in males: >0.8 × 10^{3}/microliter)

== Treatment ==
Ceftriaxone if there is typhoid fever and levofloxacin or moxifloxacin. Gentamicin and doxycycline if brucellosis.
