= Refractory cytopenia of childhood =

- Other names: RCC

Refractory cytopenia of childhood is a subgroup of myelodysplastic syndrome (MDS), having been added to the World Health Organization classification in 2008. Before then, RCC cases were classified as childhood aplastic anemia. RCC is the most common form of MDS in children and adolescents, accounting for approximately half of all MDS cases.

== Presentation ==
Symptoms result from underproduction of red blood cells (weakness, pallor, failure to thrive, pica), white blood cells (recurrent or overwhelming infection), and/or platelets (bleeding).

== Histopathologic features ==
The bone marrow of patients with RCC contains islands of erythroid precursors and spare granulocytes. In some scenarios, multiple bone marrow biopsy examinations may be recommended before a diagnosis can be established.

== Management ==
Bone marrow transplant is the only known curative treatment.
