= RAR =

RAR or Rar may refer to:

- Radial acceleration relation (RAR), a relation derived from studying the radial acceleration traced by rotation curves in galaxies
- Radio acoustic ranging, a non-visual technique for determining a ship's position at sea
- "rar", the ISO 639-2 code for the Cook Islands Māori language
- RAR (file format), a proprietary compressed archive file format in computer software
- Rarotonga International Airport, Cook Islands, IATA code RAR
- Rarus, or Rar, a figure in Greek mythology
- Retinoic acid receptor, a type of protein
- Rhodesian African Rifles, a unit of the Rhodesian Army
- Rock Against Racism, a UK movement
- Rock am Ring and Rock im Park, a German rock music festival
- Royal Australian Regiment, a unit of the Australian Army
- Ruger American Rifle, a line of centerfire bolt-action rifles
- Grupo RAR, a Portuguese company
- WinRAR, RAR, and UNRAR computer software for compressed archive files
- Ridotto Alpino Repubblicano, Republican Alpine Redoubt (RAR), intended last stronghold of the Italian fascists at the end of World War II
- Rarh region, region in eastern India
