= Refractory anemia with excess of blasts =

- Specialty: Oncology

Refractory anemia with excess of blasts (RAEB) is a type of myelodysplastic syndrome with a marrow blast percentage of 5% to 19%.

In MeSH, "Smoldering leukemia" is classified under RAEB.
