= International Prognostic Scoring System =

- Purpose: Assess severity of myelodysplastic syndrome

The International Prognostic Scoring System (IPSS), originally published in 1997, is used by many doctors to help assess the severity of a patient's myelodysplastic syndrome (MDS). Based on the IPSS score, the patient's history, and the physician's own personal observations, the physician will design a treatment plan to address the MDS. A revised IPSS, IPSS-R was published in 2012. The IPSS-M, published in 2022, includes six categories based on hematologic parameters, cytogenetic abnormalities, and somatic mutations of 31 genes.

== Process ==
The IPSS-M uses "prognostic indicators" to develop a "score" which may be useful in understanding how the MDS may progress:

- the proportion of blast cells in the bone marrow
- the type of chromosomal changes, if any, in the marrow cells
- the presence of one or more low blood cell counts (cytopenias), namely hemoglobin, platelets, or absolute neutrophil count (ANC)
- the presence of mutations in any of 16 main effect genes
- the presence of mutations in any of 15 residual genes

Each indicator is rated according to its severity and the ratings are combined into a "score".

Scores are sorted into one of six risk categories:

- very low
- low
- moderate-low
- moderate-high
- high
- very high

IPSS-M determined that multihit TP53 mutations, FLT3 mutations, and partial tandem duplication mutations of KMT2A (MLL) were strong predictors of adverse outcomes. Some SF3B1 mutations were associated with favorable outcomes, whereas certain genetic subsets of SF3B1 mutations were not.

The IPSS-M model can handle missing data and allows for the score to be applied in diagnostic settings in which not all mutations can be tested. The IPSS-M model is useful for the risk stratification of patients with MDS to predict leukemia-free survival, overall survival, and risk of leukemic transformation. Patients with high, or very high-risk IPSS-M might benefit from allogeneic hematopoietic stem cell transplantation. A web-based calculator is available at https://www.mds-foundation.org/mds-iwg-pm/
