= Promonocyte =

Type of cell

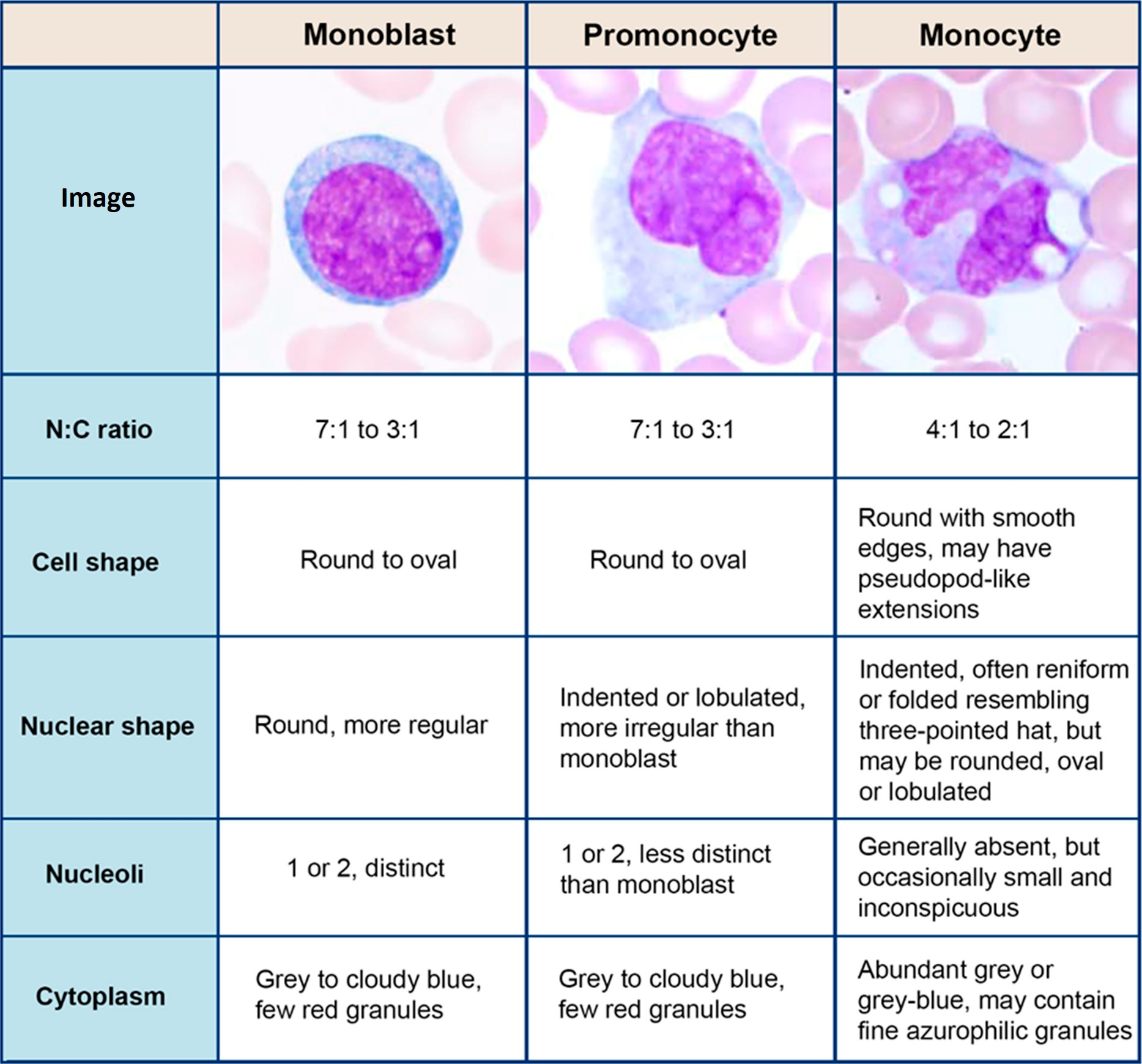
Comparison of monoblast, promonocyte and monocyte.

== Introduction ==
A promonocyte (or premonocyte) is an intermediate precursor cell in the monocyte lineage, situated between monoblasts and monocytes, and plays a crucial role in immune function and hematopoiesis. The term monocyte specifically refers to the widely accepted four-stage lineage of monoblast, premonocyte, immature monocyte, and mature monocyte, and has historically presented difficulty in distinguishing descriptions between each stage. Promonocytes are primarily found in the bone marrow, where they undergo proliferation and differentiation before entering the peripheral blood. As a part of the mononuclear phagocyte system, promonocytes play a critical role in immune surveillance, phagocytosis, and tissue homeostasis. Their identification is important for understanding normal hematopoiesis as well as diagnosing hematologic malignancies, particularly those involving the monocytic lineage. Early experimental work demonstrated the role promonocytes hold as proliferative precursors, with more recent research underscoring the diagnostic importance of correctly identifying cell types to classify acute leukemia. Recent advances in convolutional neural network models have demonstrated the application of artificial intelligence in morphological identification. However, expert identification remains the standard due to the critical role immunophenotypic differentiation plays in determining surface marker expression.

== Development and Differentiation ==
Promonocytes develop from monoblasts in the bone marrow and mature into monocytes, which differentiate into macrophages and dendritic cells. Early monocytic studies classified mononuclear phagocytes of the bone marrow into two cell types: promonocyte and monocyte. The term monocyte is now more broadly coined to refer to characteristic cells of this lineage, with natural progression from monoblast to promonocyte to monocyte in both immature and mature forms. Monocytes, derived from promonocytes, further mature into macrophages and dendritic cells upon migration into tissues, thereby forming key components of the mononuclear phagocyte system. Several studies have investigated the kinetics of this lineage. Early experiments demonstrated the in vivo differentiation of promonocytes within the bone marrow into mature monocytes, which then enter the circulation. More recent studies have discovered the role of cytokines such as M-CSF in differentiation between stages. Moreover, the promonocyte can be defined as a transitional, proliferative cell in the bone marrow that undergoes further maturation to form monocytes, which then enter the bloodstream.

== Morphology ==
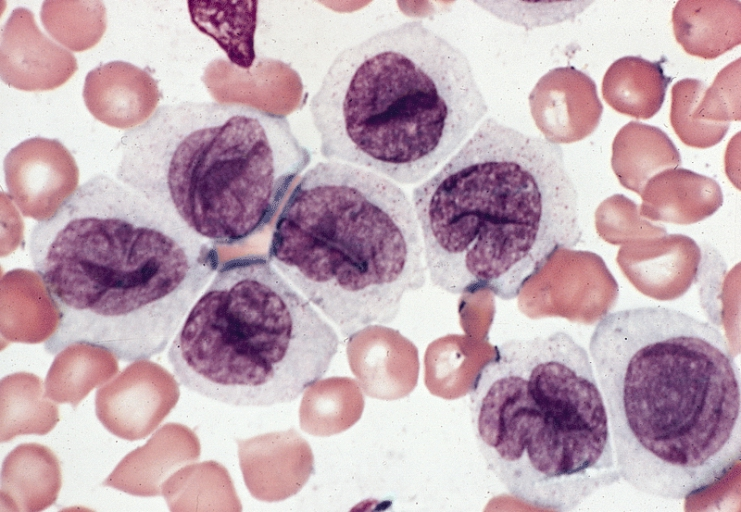
Promonocyte morphology from leukemia patient shows abundant cytoplasm with scattered MPO-negative azurophilic granules. The nuclei are marked by folds with inconspicuous nucleoli.

Promonocytes are characterized by distinct cytological features that distinguish them from both monoblasts and mature monocytes. Morphological evaluation has established diagnostic criteria for distinguishing the four monocyte precursor types, which are important in clinical diagnoses such as leukemia. The nucleus of promonocytes is convoluted, indented, folded, or grooved compared to the round, oval appearance of its monoblast precursor. Apart from this distinguishing feature, promonocytes are categorized by very similar features to monoblasts compared to later stages. One instance of this is chromatin’s delicate, lace-like appearance, which is finely dispersed and progressively condenses as the cell develops into the immature monocyte and monocyte stages. On the contrary, most experts agree that the chromatin of monoblasts exhibits a more dispersed appearance than that of promonocytes and that promonocyte nucleoli and smaller and less prominent, but with more obvious granules. The cytoplasm is less basophilic compared to the monoblast, with a grey-blue appearance and often visible, fine azurophilic granules scattered throughout. More mature monocytes have variably indented and folded nuclei within a grey cytoplasm, housing an abundance of light purple-colored granules. These observations are crucial in distinguishing the stages of monocytic lineage development throughout maturation.

== Immunophenotype ==
Promonocytes can be identified by their specific surface marker expression, as determined through immunophenotyping, which reflects their transitional stage in monocyte development. Accurate identification of promonocytes relies on both morphological and immunophenotypic features in order to prevent diagnostic confusion with promyelocytes in acute leukemia. Promonocytes exhibit immunophenotypic characteristics consistent with the rest of the monocytic lineage. This includes the presence of monocytic markers and the absence of granulocytic markers, which are typically seen in promyelocytes. Correct recognition of these features is crucial for accurate diagnosis of acute monocytic leukemia as opposed to acute myelocytic leukemia. Even as technology advances, immunophenotypic differentiation remains a crucial standard in diagnostic hematopathology, as automated systems cannot yet replace expert immunophenotypic interpretation.

== Role in Hematopoiesis ==
Promonocytes play a central role in hematopoiesis by ensuring the continuous production of monocytes, which are essential for immune system maintenance. Specifically, promonocytes' contribution as proliferative precursors allows them to sustain monocyte production within the bone marrow. As promonocytes divide and mature, a steady stream of monocytes enters the bloodstream, replenishing phagocytic cells throughout the body. The aforementioned kinetic relationship between in vivo promonocytes and their subsequent circulating monocytes further promotes the identification of their role in the regulated normal turnover of the mononuclear phagocyte system. Macrophage and dendritic cell pools are consequently replenished as available monocytes differentiate when needed for immune function and tissue maintenance.

== Clinical Significance ==
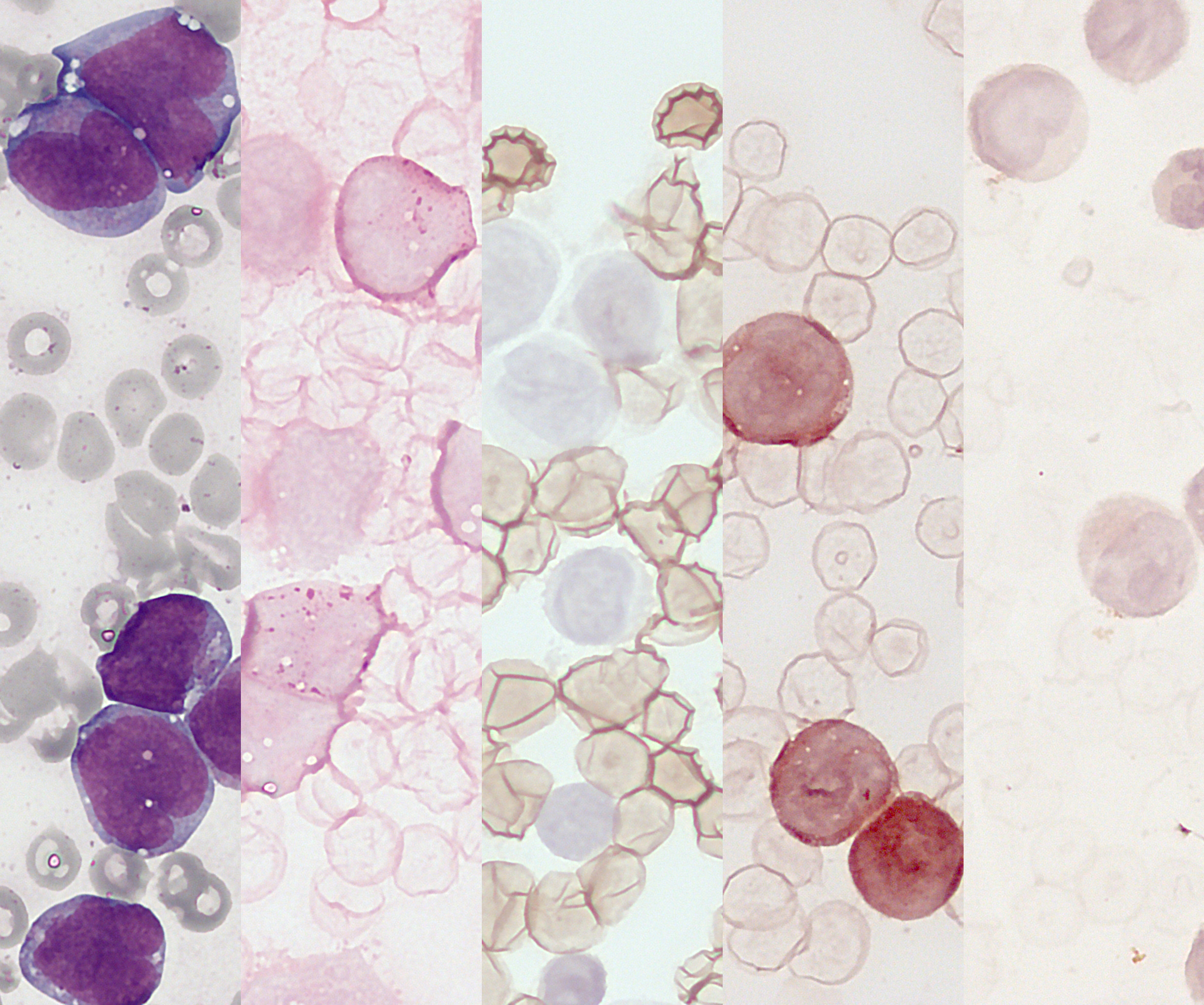
Different stains of acute monocytic leukemia.

The presence and identification of promonocytes are clinically important in hematological diagnostics and disease classification. As previously mentioned, promonocytes have often been misclassified as promyelocytes in cases of acute leukemia, which can lead to diagnostic errors. Careful morphological and immunophenotypic evaluation is necessary for the correct identification of promonocytes in bone marrow samples and subsequently for correct diagnoses. Case studies have documented the progression of chronic myelomonocytic leukemia to acute monocytic leukemia, noting the expansion of promonocytes and monoblasts. The progression to acute disease was found to be associated with the development of new chromosome abnormalities, specifically including trisomy 8. These observations underscore the importance of promonocytic roles in disease evolution and, therefore, the significance of monitoring their presence as an indicator for leukemic transformation. Accurate and timely recognition is thereby critical for early classification and treatment planning in the clinical setting.

== Emerging Diagnostic Approaches ==
Advances in computational and imaging methods are being developed to improve the recognition of promonocytes. One such example is digital analysis and neural network models, which have expanded upon the idea of visual recognition by focusing on morphological image recognition to more clearly establish stages in monocytic cell lineage. Convolutional neural network models emerged as a consequence of the difficulty in reliably distinguishing morphologically similar cell types in diagnostic practice, but they are limited in that they cannot yet match the accuracy of expert hematopathologists. Moreover, human expert agreement remains essential due to the importance of immunophenotypic interpretation, despite the use of artificial intelligence for morphological assessment.

== Research Applications ==
Promonocytes are studied in immunology and oncology to gain a better understanding of monocyte development and leukemogenesis. Early in vivo models established a foundational qualitative framework for studying monocytic turnover and continue to inform modern research. More recently, promonocyte expansion in leukemic transformation has been established as a biological marker of disease that warrants further study. As research expands into cytokine signaling and differentiation pathways, these findings underscore the continued importance of promonocytes as both experimental and clinical models for understanding monocyte differentiation and the progression of hematologic malignancies.

== See also ==
- Monoblast
- Monocyte
- Macrophage
- Dendritic Cell
- Hematopoiesis
- Mononuclear Phagocyte System
- Acute Monocytic Leukemia
- Chronic Myelomonocytic Leukemia

== Additional images ==
Hematopoiesis

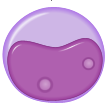
Schematic image of a promonocyte
