= Hypomethylating agent =

Drug type for epigenetic therapy

A hypomethylating agent (or demethylating agent) is a drug that inhibits DNA methylation: the modification of DNA nucleotides by addition of a methyl group. Because DNA methylation affects cellular function through successive generations of cells without changing the underlying DNA sequence, treatment with a hypomethylating agent is considered a type of epigenetic therapy.

Currently available hypomethylating agents block the activity of DNA methyltransferase (DNA methyltransferase inhibitors / DNMT inhibitors). Currently two members of the class, azacitidine and decitabine, are FDA-approved for use in the United States in myelodysplastic syndrome and are being investigated for use in a number of tumors.

== Clinical use ==
Two hypomethylating agents are approved for the treatment of myelodysplastic syndrome by the United States FDA

- decitabine Also has EU approval for acute myeloid leukemia (AML).
- azacitidine

== Mechanism of action ==
DNA methylation is the modification of DNA nucleotides by addition of a methyl group. These methyl groups are associated with changes in the ability of the corresponding DNA to be used. Patterns of DNA methylation are stable during cellular division. Methylation of tumor suppressor genes in some cancers contributes to the growth and survival of the cancer. Hypomethylating agents decrease the amount of cellular DNA methylation, allowing for tumor suppressor gene expression.

== See also ==
- DNA methyltransferase
