= Refractory anemia with ring sideroblasts =

- Other names: RARS

Refractory anemia with ring sideroblasts is a type of myelodysplastic syndrome. RARS is characterized by 5% or less myeloblasts in bone marrow. RARS is distinguished from refractory anemia by having 15% or more ringed sideroblasts among the erythroid precursors in the bone marrow.
