= Cytopenia =

Medical condition

Cytopenia is a reduction in the number of mature blood cells. It can have many causes, and commonly occurs in people with cancer being treated with radiation therapy or chemotherapy.

== Types ==
- Anemia – a reduction of the red blood cells in the body.
- Leukopenia – a deficiency of white blood cells, or leukocytes
- Neutropenia – a type of leukopenia, with a specific deficiency in neutrophils
- Thrombocytopenia – a deficiency of platelets
- Pancytopenia – when all three types of blood cells; red blood cells, white blood cells, and platelets, are all deficient. This is a life-threatening disorder that is a characteristic of aplastic anemia.

There are also two general causes of cytopenia: autoimmune and refractory. Autoimmune cytopenia is caused by an autoimmune disease when your body produces antibodies to destroy the healthy blood cells. Refractory cytopenia is caused by bone marrow not producing healthy blood cells, and can be a result of cancer.

== Symptoms and signs ==
The symptoms of cytopenia vary depending on the type.

The symptoms of anemia include:

- Fatigue
- Weakness
- Shortness of breath
- Poor concentration
- Dizziness or feeling lightheaded
- Cold hands or feet

The symptoms of leukopenia include:

- Frequent infections
- Fever

The symptoms of thrombocytopenia include:

- Easily bleeding or bruising
- Difficulty to stop bleeding
- Internal bleeding

== Causes ==
Cytopenias can be caused by anything that decreases the production of blood cells or increases the destruction of blood cells. This includes, but is not limited to:

- Chemotherapy
- Malignant tumors
- Antacids
- Antibiotics
- Anticonvulsants
- Antimalarials
- Antivirals
- Cardiac drugs
- Diabetes drugs
- Hyperthyroid drugs
- NSAIDs
- Rheumatoid arthritis drugs

== Treatment ==
The treatments for cytopenia vary depending on the type of cytopenia. The treatment for anemia is rest and a diet consisting of high iron foods. Medication can also be used such as:

- Epoetin alfa, a synthetic erythropoietin that stimulates stem cells to produce red blood cells.
- Darbepoetin alfa stimulates red blood cells but requires less daily doses and less disruption in activities.
- Growth factors, synthetic versions of substances involved in stimulating red and white blood cell production, such as G-CSF and GM-CSF.

People with leukopenia are advised to avoid contact with people who are ill, monitor closely for signs of infection, and take antibiotics when appropriate.

Bone marrow and stem cell transplantation are effective for many types of cytopenias. However, when a compatible donor cannot be found, immunosuppressive therapy is also common.

== See also ==
- Polycythemia, the opposite of anemia
