= Monoblast =

Cell that matures into a monocyte

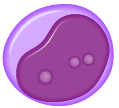
- Monoblast

Details
- System: Immune system
- Location: Bone marrow
- Function: A precursor monocyte

Identifiers
- TH: H2.00.04.3.08002
- FMA: 83553

Monoblasts are the committed progenitor cells that differentiated from a committed macrophage or dendritic cell precursor (MDP) in the process of hematopoiesis. They are the first developmental stage in the monocyte series leading to a macrophage. Their myeloid cell fate is induced by the concentration of cytokines they are surrounded by during development. These cytokines induce the activation of transcription factors which push completion of the monoblast's myeloid cell fate. Monoblasts are normally found in bone marrow and do not appear in the normal peripheral blood. They mature into monocytes which, in turn, develop into macrophages. They then are seen as macrophages in the normal peripheral blood and many different tissues of the body. Macrophages can produce a variety of effector molecules that initiate local, systemic inflammatory responses. These monoblast differentiated cells are equipped to fight off foreign invaders using pattern recognition receptors to detect antigen as part of the innate immune response.

== Structure ==
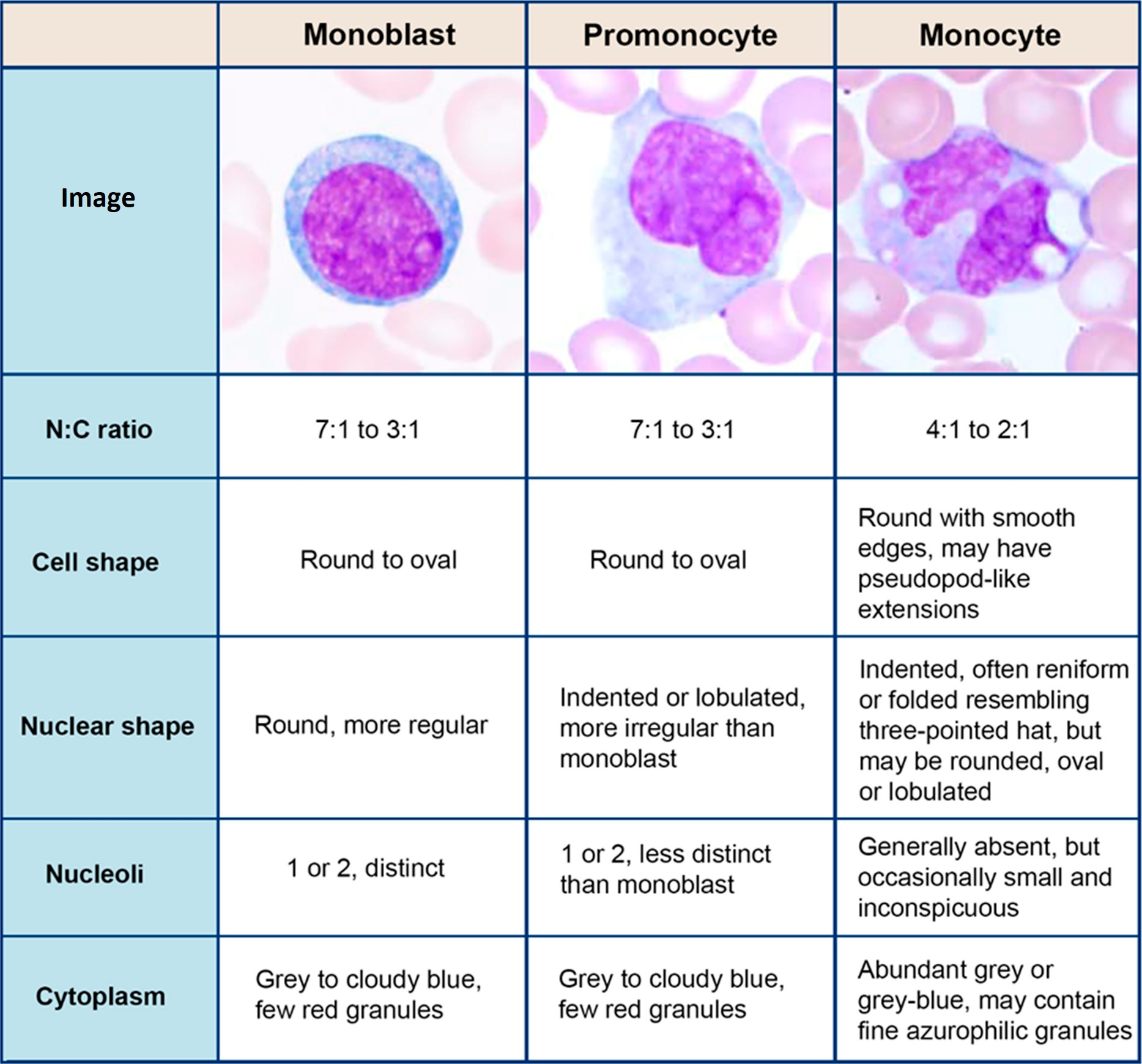
Comparison of monoblast, promonocyte and monocyte.

A typical monoblast is about 12 to 20 μm in diameter, has a nuclear to cytoplasm ratio of 4:1 to 3:1, and, like most myeloid blasts, has a round to oval nucleus with fine chromatin structure. Compared to other myeloid blasts, monoblasts have more cytoplasm. The nucleoli it contains is usually distinct. One to four nucleoli are usually visible. The nucleus can be central or eccentric and it can show evidence of indentation or folding. The cytoplasm stains moderately to lightly basophilic and may contain small azurophilic granules. These granules contain enzymes that can damage or digest pathogens and also release inflammatory signals in the periphery. Auer rods are there, but rarely seen. Easily observed in the round monoblast nucleus is lacy, clear chromatin and distinct nucleoli.

== Development ==
The monoblast is the first stage of monocyte-macrophage maturation. The developmental stages of the monoblast are: CFU-GM (pluripotential hemopoietic stem cell or hemocytoblast) -> monoblast -> promonocyte -> monocyte-> macrophage/dendritic cell. During their development, monocytes are present in large packs in all of the lymph nodes in the body.

Hematopoietic stem cells mature into monoblasts by being in a concentrated environment of certain cytokines that induce activation of certain transcription factors. The development of monoblasts occurs when certain transcription factors are activated, crucial ones being PU.1 and GATA1. Development continues by, yet again, the activation of certain transcription factors. A monoblast matures into a monocyte if the transcription factors PU.1 and C/EBPa are expressed.

Monocytes will then develop into macrophages or dendritic cells upon tissue damage and recruitment of monocytes into the infected area. During recruitment monocytes are distinct from macrophages and dendritic cells, but upon entering the infected area, monocytes will acquire inflammatory effector functions and then differentiate into inflammatory cells such as macrophages or dendritic cells. These inflammatory cells are now better equipped to combat a foreign invader quickly (in the case of macrophages) and specifically (in the case of a dendritic cell) through activating different parts of the Immune response.

Additional images

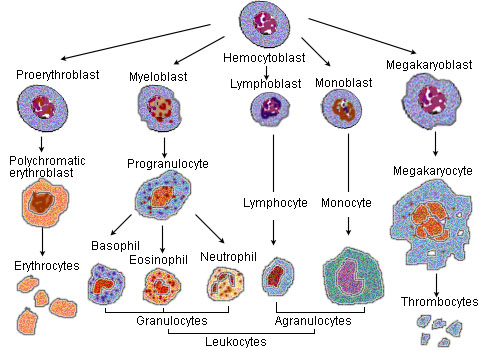
Blood cell lineage

Hematopoiesis

This image represents the development from a HSC to a monocyte through various transcription factors activation which are in italics. The lymphoid cell development junctures to the right while the myeloid cell development junctures to the left side and below. Each cell that does not contain much in their cytoplasm represents a type of precursor cell. Each cell name is above each cell.

== See also ==
- Monocyte
- Macrophage
- Agranulocyte
- White blood cell
