= Haematopoiesis =

Formation of blood cellular components

Diagram showing the development of different blood cells from haematopoietic stem cell to mature cells

A cell that arises from a progenitor cell during hematopoiesis. Myeloid cells can become granulocytes, monocytes, erythrocytes, or platelets.

Haematopoiesis (/hɪˌmætəpɔɪˈiːsɪs, ˌhiːmətoʊ-, ˌhɛmə-/; from Ancient Greek αἷμα (haîma) 'blood' and ποιεῖν (poieîn) 'to make'; also hematopoiesis in US English (Note: see spelling differences between US and Commonwealth English), sometimes h(a)emopoiesis) is the formation of blood cellular components. All cellular blood components are derived from haematopoietic stem cells.

A normal adult body produces a daily average of around 200 billion red blood cells (to transport oxygen), 100 billion white blood cells (for the immune system), and 100 billion platelets (for coagulation).

== Process ==
=== Haematopoietic stem cells (HSCs) ===
Haematopoietic stem cells (HSCs) reside in the medulla of the bone (bone marrow) and have the unique ability to give rise to all of the different mature blood cell types and tissues. HSCs are self-renewing cells: when they differentiate, at least some of their daughter cells remain as HSCs so the pool of stem cells is not depleted. This phenomenon is called asymmetric division. The other daughters of HSCs (myeloid and lymphoid progenitor cells) can follow any of the other differentiation pathways that lead to the production of one or more specific types of blood cell, but cannot renew themselves. The pool of progenitors is heterogeneous and can be divided into two groups; long-term self-renewing HSC and only transiently self-renewing HSC, also called short-terms. This is one of the main vital processes in the body.

=== Cell types ===
All blood cells are divided into three lineages.

- Red blood cells, which are also called erythrocytes, are the oxygen-carrying cells. Erythrocytes are functional, and are released into the blood. The number of reticulocytes, which are immature red blood cells, gives an estimate of the rate of erythropoiesis.
- Lymphocytes are the cornerstone of the adaptive immune system. They are derived from common lymphoid progenitors. The lymphoid lineage is composed of T-cells, B-cells, and natural killer cells. This is lymphopoiesis.
- Cells of the myeloid lineage, which include granulocytes, megakaryocytes, monocytes, and macrophages, are derived from common myeloid progenitors, and are involved in such diverse roles as innate immunity and blood clotting. This is myelopoiesis.

Granulopoiesis (or granulocytopoiesis) is haematopoiesis of granulocytes, except mast cells which are granulocytes but with an extramedullar maturation.

Thrombopoiesis is haematopoiesis of thrombocytes (platelets).

=== Terminology ===
Between 1948 and 1950, the Committee for Clarification of the Nomenclature of Cells and Diseases of the Blood and Blood-forming Organs issued reports on the nomenclature of blood cells. An overview of the terminology is shown below, from earliest to final stage of development:

- [root]blast
- pro[root]cyte
- [root]cyte
- meta[root]cyte
- mature cell name

The root for erythrocyte colony-forming units (CFU-E) is "rubri", for granulocyte-monocyte colony-forming units (CFU-GM) is "granulo" or "myelo" and "mono", for lymphocyte colony-forming units (CFU-L) is "lympho" and for megakaryocyte colony-forming units (CFU-Meg) is "megakaryo". According to this terminology, the stages of red blood cell formation would be: rubriblast, prorubricyte, rubricyte, metarubricyte, and erythrocyte. However, the following nomenclature seems to be, at present, the most prevalent:

Committee	"lympho"	"rubri"	"granulo" or "myelo"	"mono"	"megakaryo"
Lineage	Lymphoid	Myeloid	Myeloid	Myeloid	Myeloid
CFU	CFU-L	CFU-GEMM→CFU-E	CFU-GEMM→CFU-GM→CFU-G	CFU-GEMM→CFU-GM→CFU-M	CFU-GEMM→CFU-Meg
Process	lymphocytopoiesis	erythropoiesis	granulocytopoiesis	monocytopoiesis	thrombocytopoiesis
[root]blast	Lymphoblast	Proerythroblast	Myeloblast	Monoblast	Megakaryoblast
pro[root]cyte	Prolymphocyte	Polychromatic normoblast	Promyelocyte	Promonocyte	Promegakaryocyte
[root]cyte	–	Normoblast	Eosino/neutro/basophilic myelocyte		Megakaryocyte
meta[root]cyte	Large lymphocyte	Reticulocyte	Eosinophilic/neutrophilic/basophilic metamyelocyte, Eosinophilic/neutrophilic/basophilic band cell	Early monocyte	-
mature cell name	Small lymphocyte	Erythrocyte	granulocytes (Eosino/neutro/basophil)	Monocyte	thrombocytes (Platelets)

Osteoclasts also arise from hemopoietic cells of the monocyte/neutrophil lineage, specifically CFU-GM.

== Location ==
Sites of haematopoiesis (human) in pre- and postnatal periods

In developing embryos, blood formation occurs in aggregates of blood cells in the yolk sac, called blood islands. As development progresses, blood formation occurs in the spleen, liver and lymph nodes. When bone marrow develops, it eventually assumes the task of forming most of the blood cells for the entire organism. However, maturation, activation, and some proliferation of lymphoid cells occurs in the spleen, thymus, and lymph nodes. In children, haematopoiesis occurs in the marrow of the long bones such as the femur and tibia. In adults, it occurs mainly in the pelvis, cranium, vertebrae, and sternum.

=== Extramedullary ===
In some cases, the liver, thymus, and spleen may resume their haematopoietic function, if necessary. This is called extramedullary haematopoiesis. It may cause these organs to increase in size substantially. During fetal development, since bones and thus the bone marrow develop later, the liver functions as the main haematopoietic organ. Therefore, the liver is enlarged during development. Extramedullary haematopoiesis and myelopoiesis may supply leukocytes in cardiovascular disease and inflammation during adulthood. Splenic macrophages and adhesion molecules may be involved in regulation of extramedullary myeloid cell generation in cardiovascular disease.

== Maturation ==
More detailed and comprehensive diagram that shows the development of different blood cells in humans: The morphological characteristics of the hematopoietic cells are shown as seen in a Wright's stain, May-Giemsa stain or May-Grünwald-Giemsa stain. Alternative names of certain cells are indicated between parentheses.; Certain cells may have more than one characteristic appearance. In these cases, more than one representation of the same cell has been included.; Together, the monocyte and the lymphocytes comprise the agranulocytes, as opposed to the granulocytes (basophil, neutrophil and eosinophil) that are produced during granulopoiesis.; B., N. and E. stand for Basophilic, Neutrophilic and Eosinophilic, respectively – as in Basophilic promyelocyte. For lymphocytes, the T and B are actual designations.; 1. The polychromatic erythrocyte (reticulocyte) at the right shows its characteristic appearance when stained with methylene blue or Azure B.; 2. The erythrocyte at the right is a more accurate representation of its appearance in reality when viewed through a microscope.; 3. Other cells that arise from the monocyte: osteoclast, microglia (central nervous system), Langerhans cell (epidermis), Kupffer cell (liver).; 4. For clarity, the T and B lymphocyte are split to better indicate that the plasma cell arises from the B-cell. Note that there is no difference in the appearance of B- and T-cells unless specific staining is applied.

As a stem cell matures it undergoes changes in gene expression that limit the cell types that it can become and moves it closer to a specific cell type (cellular differentiation). These changes can often be tracked by monitoring the presence of proteins on the surface of the cell. Each successive change moves the cell closer to the final cell type and further limits its potential to become a different cell type.

=== Cell fate determination ===
Two models for haematopoiesis have been proposed: determinism and stochastic theory. For the stem cells and other undifferentiated blood cells in the bone marrow, the determination is generally explained by the determinism theory of haematopoiesis, saying that colony stimulating factors and other factors of the haematopoietic microenvironment determine the cells to follow a certain path of cell differentiation. This is the classical way of describing haematopoiesis. In stochastic theory, undifferentiated blood cells differentiate to specific cell types by randomness. This theory has been supported by experiments showing that within a population of mouse haematopoietic progenitor cells, underlying stochastic variability in the distribution of Sca-1, a stem cell factor, subdivides the population into groups exhibiting variable rates of cellular differentiation. For example, under the influence of erythropoietin (an erythrocyte-differentiation factor), a subpopulation of cells (as defined by the levels of Sca-1) differentiated into erythrocytes at a sevenfold higher rate than the rest of the population. Furthermore, it was shown that if allowed to grow, this subpopulation re-established the original subpopulation of cells, supporting the theory that this is a stochastic, reversible process. Another level at which stochasticity may be important is in the process of apoptosis and self-renewal. In this case, the haematopoietic microenvironment prevails upon some of the cells to survive and some, on the other hand, to perform apoptosis and die. By regulating this balance between different cell types, the bone marrow can alter the quantity of different cells to ultimately be produced.

=== Growth factors ===
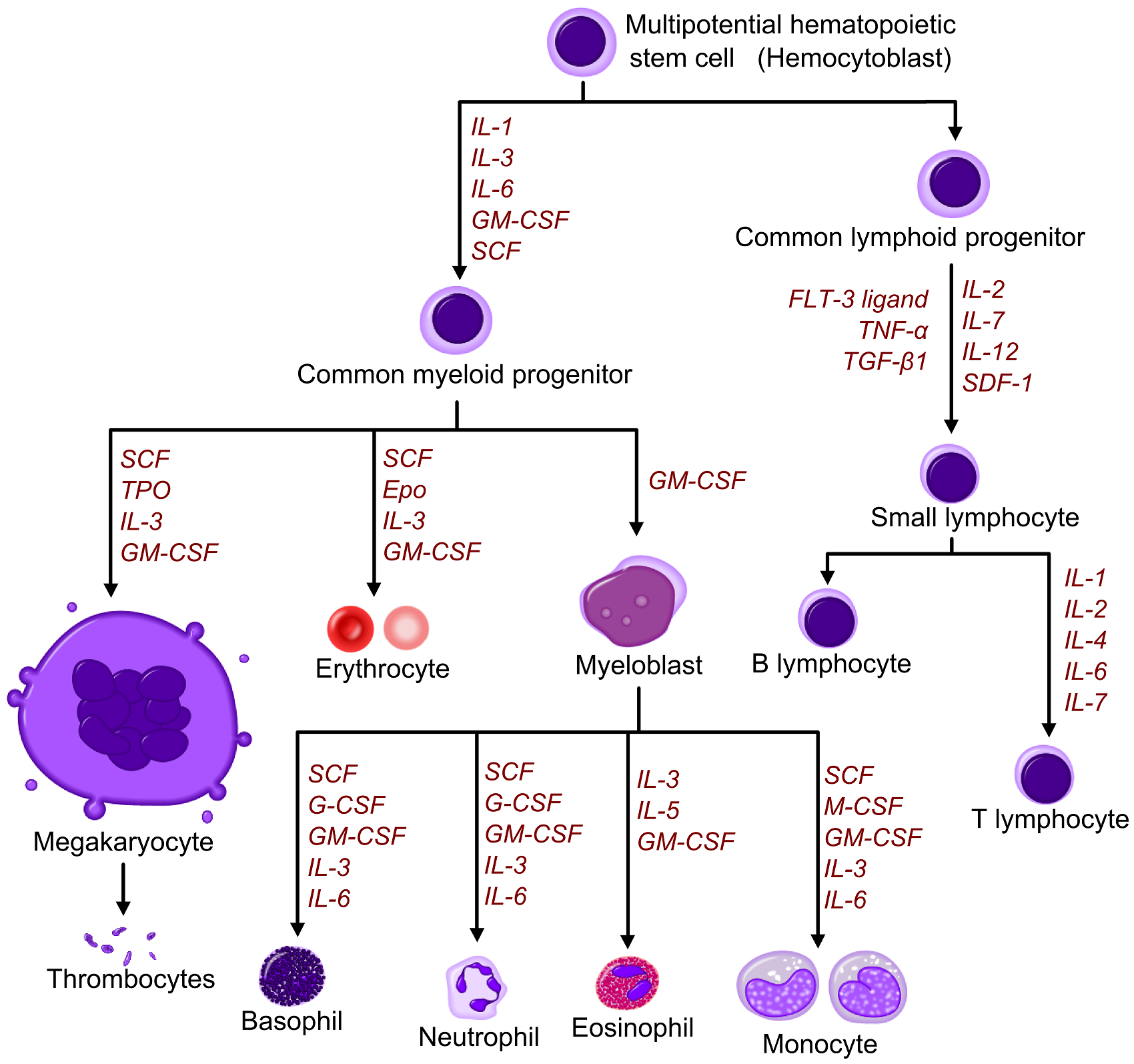
Diagram including some of the important cytokines that determine which type of blood cell will be created. SCF= Stem cell factor; Tpo= Thrombopoietin; IL= Interleukin; GM-CSF= Granulocyte Macrophage-colony stimulating factor; Epo= Erythropoietin; M-CSF= Macrophage-colony stimulating factor; G-CSF= Granulocyte-colony stimulating factor; SDF-1= Stromal cell-derived factor-1; FLT-3 ligand= FMS-like tyrosine kinase 3 ligand; TNF-a = Tumour necrosis factor-alpha; TGFβ = Transforming growth factor beta

Red and white blood cell production is regulated with great precision in healthy humans, and the production of leukocytes is rapidly increased during infection. The proliferation and self-renewal of these cells depend on growth factors. One of the key players in self-renewal and development of haematopoietic cells is stem cell factor (SCF), which binds to the c-kit receptor on the HSC. Absence of SCF is lethal. There are other important glycoprotein growth factors which regulate the proliferation and maturation, such as interleukins IL-2, IL-3, IL-6, IL-7. Other factors, termed colony-stimulating factors (CSFs), specifically stimulate the production of committed cells. Three CSFs are granulocyte-macrophage CSF (GM-CSF), granulocyte CSF (G-CSF) and macrophage CSF (M-CSF). These stimulate granulocyte formation and are active on either progenitor cells or end product cells.

Erythropoietin is required for a myeloid progenitor cell to become an erythrocyte. On the other hand, thrombopoietin makes myeloid progenitor cells differentiate to megakaryocytes (thrombocyte-forming cells). The diagram to the right provides examples of cytokines and the differentiated blood cells they give rise to.

=== Transcription factors ===
Growth factors initiate signal transduction pathways, which lead to activation of transcription factors. Growth factors elicit different outcomes depending on the combination of factors and the cell's stage of differentiation. For example, long-term expression of PU.1 results in myeloid commitment, and short-term induction of PU.1 activity leads to the formation of immature eosinophils. Recently, it was reported that transcription factors such as NF-κB can be regulated by microRNAs (e.g., miR-125b) in haematopoiesis.

The first key player of differentiation from HSC to a multipotent progenitor (MPP) is transcription factor CCAAT-enhancer binding protein α (C/EBPα). Mutations in C/EBPα are associated with acute myeloid leukaemia. From this point, cells can either differentiate along the Erythroid-megakaryocyte lineage or lymphoid and myeloid lineage, which have common progenitor, called lymphoid-primed multipotent progenitor. There are two main transcription factors. PU.1 for Erythroid-megakaryocyte lineage and GATA-1, which leads to a lymphoid-primed multipotent progenitor.

Other transcription factors include Ikaros (B cell development), and Gfi1 (promotes Th2 development and inhibits Th1) or IRF8 (basophils and mast cells). Significantly, certain factors elicit different responses at different stages in the haematopoiesis. For example, CEBPα in neutrophil development or PU.1 in monocytes and dendritic cell development. Processes are not unidirectional: differentiated cells may regain attributes of progenitor cells.

An example is PAX5 factor, which is important in B cell development and associated with lymphomas. Surprisingly, pax5 conditional knock out mice allowed peripheral mature B cells to de-differentiate to early bone marrow progenitors. These findings show that transcription factors act as caretakers of differentiation level and not only as initiators.

Mutations in transcription factors are tightly connected to blood cancers, as acute myeloid leukaemia (AML) or acute lymphoblastic leukaemia (ALL). For example, Ikaros is known to be regulator of numerous biological events. Mice with no Ikaros lack B cells, Natural killer, and T cells. Ikaros has six zinc fingers domains, four are conserved DNA-binding domain and two are for dimerisation. Very important finding is, that different zinc fingers are involved in binding to different place in DNA and this is the reason for pleiotropic effect of Ikaros and different involvement in cancer, but mainly are mutations associated with BCR-Abl patients and it is bad prognostic marker.

== Other animals ==
In some vertebrates, haematopoiesis can occur wherever there is a loose stroma of connective tissue and slow blood supply, such as the gut, spleen or kidney.

Unlike eutherian mammals, the liver of newborn marsupials is actively haematopoietic.

== See also ==
- Erythropoiesis-stimulating agents
- Haematopoietic stimulants:
  - Granulocyte colony-stimulating factor
  - Granulocyte macrophage colony-stimulating factor
- Leukocyte extravasation
