= Chronic neutrophilic leukemia =

- Other names: CNL
- Specialty: Hematology and oncology

Chronic neutrophilic leukemia (CNL) is a rare myeloproliferative neoplasm that features a persistent neutrophilia in peripheral blood, myeloid hyperplasia in bone marrow, hepatosplenomegaly, and the absence of the Philadelphia chromosome or a BCR/ABL fusion gene.

== Signs and symptoms ==
The most common clinical finding is hepatosplenomegaly. Pruritus, gout, and mucocutaneous bleeding are occasionally seen.

== Cause ==
The cause of CNL is currently unknown. An association between CNL and multiple myeloma has been suggested based on the observation of myeloma in 20% of CNL cases. However, a clonal genetic abnormality has not been detected in these myeloma-associated cases of CNL, raising the possibility that the neutrophilia is a reaction due to the neoplastic myeloma cells. The postulated cell of origin is a limited-potential, marrow-derived stem cell.

== Genetics ==
The majority (90%) of cases have not had detectable cytogenetic abnormalities. Most importantly, the Philadelphia chromosome and other BCR/ABL fusion genes are not detected.

== Diagnosis ==
=== Laboratory findings ===
Peripheral blood neutrophilia (> 25 × 10^{9}/L) with myeloid precursors (promyelocytes, myelocytes, metamyelocytes) comprising less than 5% of leukocytes.

=== Sites of involvement ===
Peripheral blood, bone marrow, spleen, and liver are most common, but any organ or tissue can be infiltrated by neutrophils.

==== Bone marrow biopsy ====
On both the bone marrow aspirate and the core biopsy, a hypercellular marrow with an increased myeloid:erythroid ratio of 20:1 or greater. Myelocytes and neutrophils are increased, and blasts and promyelocytes are not increased. Due to the myeloproliferative nature of the disease, an increase in megakaryocytes and erythroid precursors may be observed, but dyspoiesis in not seen in any cell lineage. Also, reticulin fibrosis is rare. There is a reported association between CNL and multiple myeloma, so the bone marrow biopsy may show evidence of a plasma cell dyscrasia with increased numbers of atypical plasma cells.

==== Spleen ====
Splenic infiltrates are typically found only in the red pulp.

==== Liver ====
Hepatic infiltrates can be found in either the sinusoids, portal triad regions, or both.

=== Immunophenotype ===
No distinct immunophenotype abnormality for CNL has been described. See OHSU 2013 findings of gene CSF3R, mutation p. T6181.

== Epidemiology ==
This is a rare disease, with less than 100 cases reported. Of these cases, an equal male:female ratio was observed, with cases typically seen in older adults.
