= Granulopoiesis =

Formation of granulocyte cells in the bone marrow

Diagram of human haematopoiesis, showing all types of granulocyte precursors.

Granulopoiesis (or granulocytopoiesis) is a part of haematopoiesis, that leads to the production of granulocytes. A granulocyte, also referred to as a polymorphonuclear leukocyte (PMN), is a type of white blood cell that has multi lobed nuclei, usually containing three lobes, and has a significant amount of cytoplasmic granules within the cell. Granulopoiesis takes place in the bone marrow. It leads to the production of three types of mature granulocytes: neutrophils (most abundant, making up to 60% of all white blood cells), eosinophils (up to 4%) and basophils (up to 1%).

== Stages of granulocyte development ==
Granulopoiesis is often divided into two parts;

1) Granulocyte lineage determination and

2) Committed granulopoiesis.

=== Granulocyte lineage determination ===
Granulopoiesis, as well as the rest of haematopoiesis, begins from a haematopoietic stem cell. These are multipotent cells that reside in the bone marrow niche and have the ability to give rise to all haematopoietic cells, as well as the ability of self renewal. They give rise to either a common lymphoid progenitor (CLP, a progenitor for all lymphoid cells) or a common myeloid progenitor, CMP, an oligopotent progenitor cell, that gives rise to the myeloid part of the haematopoietic tree. The first stage of the myeloid lineage is a granulocyte - monocyte progenitor (GMP), still an oligopotent progenitor, which then develops into unipotent cells that will later on form a population of granulocytes, as well as a population of monocytes. The first unipotent cell in granulopoiesis is a myeloblast.

=== Committed granulopoiesis ===
Committed granulopoiesis consists of maturation stages of unipotent cells. The first cell that starts to resemble a granulocyte is a myeloblast. It is characterized by large oval nucleus that takes up most of the space in the cell and very little cytoplasm. The next developmental stage, a promyelocyte, still has a large oval nucleus, but there is more cytoplasm in the cell at this point, also cytoplasmic granules are beginning to form. The development of granules continues with the next stage, a myelocyte. At this point, the nucleus is starting to shrink. At the stage of a metamyelocyte the cell nucleus is becoming kidney-shaped and it becomes even more bent in the stage of a band cell. The maturation is finished with the emergence of a segmented nucleus that is specific for a mature granulocyte.

== Regulation of granulopoiesis ==
=== Transcriptional regulation ===
The maturation of granulocytic precursors is tightly regulated at transcriptional level. Granulocyte lineage determination is regulated by expression of C/EBPα, which is necessary for the transition from CMPs to GMPs and levels of PU.1, that drive the differentation from GMPs to monocytes (high PU.1 levels) or to granulocytes (low PU.1 levels). Committed granulopoiesis is regulated by C/EBPε and GFI-1, these two transcriptional factors are important for terminal granulocyte differentiation. Other transcriptional factors that regulate granulopoiesis are: CBF, MYB, SMAD4 and HOX genes.

=== Regulation by cytokines ===
Granulopoiesis is also regulated by cytokines to a certain extent. The main cytokines driving granulopoiesis are: GM-CSF (formation of GMPs from CMPs), G-CSF (commitment to the granulocyte lineage, formation of myeloblasts from GMPs), IL-3 (enhances the production of GM-CSF and G-CSF) and SCF. These are secreted by other haematopoietic cells in the bone marrow or at the site of inflammation as well as epithelial and endothelial cells.

== Types of granulopoiesis ==
=== Steady state granulopoiesis ===
Steady state granulopoiesis is a term used to describe the normal daily production of granulocytes. Granulocytes are short lived cells (their lifespan is between 6 and 8 hours) with a high cell turnover. The number of granulocytes produced every day is between 5 and 10 × 10^{10}. The master regulator of steady state granulopoiesis is C/EBPα. It restricts the cell cycle of immature cells by inhibition of CDK2 and CDK4 and promotes granulocytic differentiation. Steady state production of granulocytes is activated after the engulfment of apoptotic granulocytes by tissue macrophages.
