= Myelopoiesis =

Production of bone marrow and blood cells

In hematology, myelopoiesis in the broadest sense of the term is the production of bone marrow and of all cells that arise from it, namely, all blood cells. In a narrower sense, myelopoiesis also refers specifically to the regulated formation of myeloid leukocytes (myelocytes), including eosinophilic granulocytes, basophilic granulocytes, neutrophilic granulocytes, and monocytes.

The common myeloid progenitor can differentiate in the bone marrow into red blood cells and megakaryocytes (leading to platelets) as well as mast cells and myeloblasts, the latter leading to the myelocytic line (granulocytes) and to monocytes, macrophages, and dendritic cells of the innate immune system. The granulocytes, also called polymorphonuclear leukocytes because of their multilobed nuclei, are three short lived cell types including eosinophils, basophils, and neutrophils. A granulocyte differentiates into a distinct cell type by a process called granulopoiesis. In this process it first transforms from a common myeloblast (myeloid progenitor) to a common promyelocyte. This promyelocyte gives rise to a unique myelocyte that for the first time can be classified as an eosinophil, basophil, or neutrophil progenitor based on the histological staining affinity (eosinophilic, basophilic, or neutral granules). The unique myelocyte next differentiates into a metamyelocyte and then a band cell, with a C-shaped nucleus, before becoming a mature eosinophil, basophil, or neutrophil. Macrophages come from monoblast progenitors that differentiate into promonocytes, which mature into monocytes. Monocytes eventually enter the tissues and become macrophages.
