= CFU-GEMM =

Colony forming unit that generates myeloid cells in the bone marrow

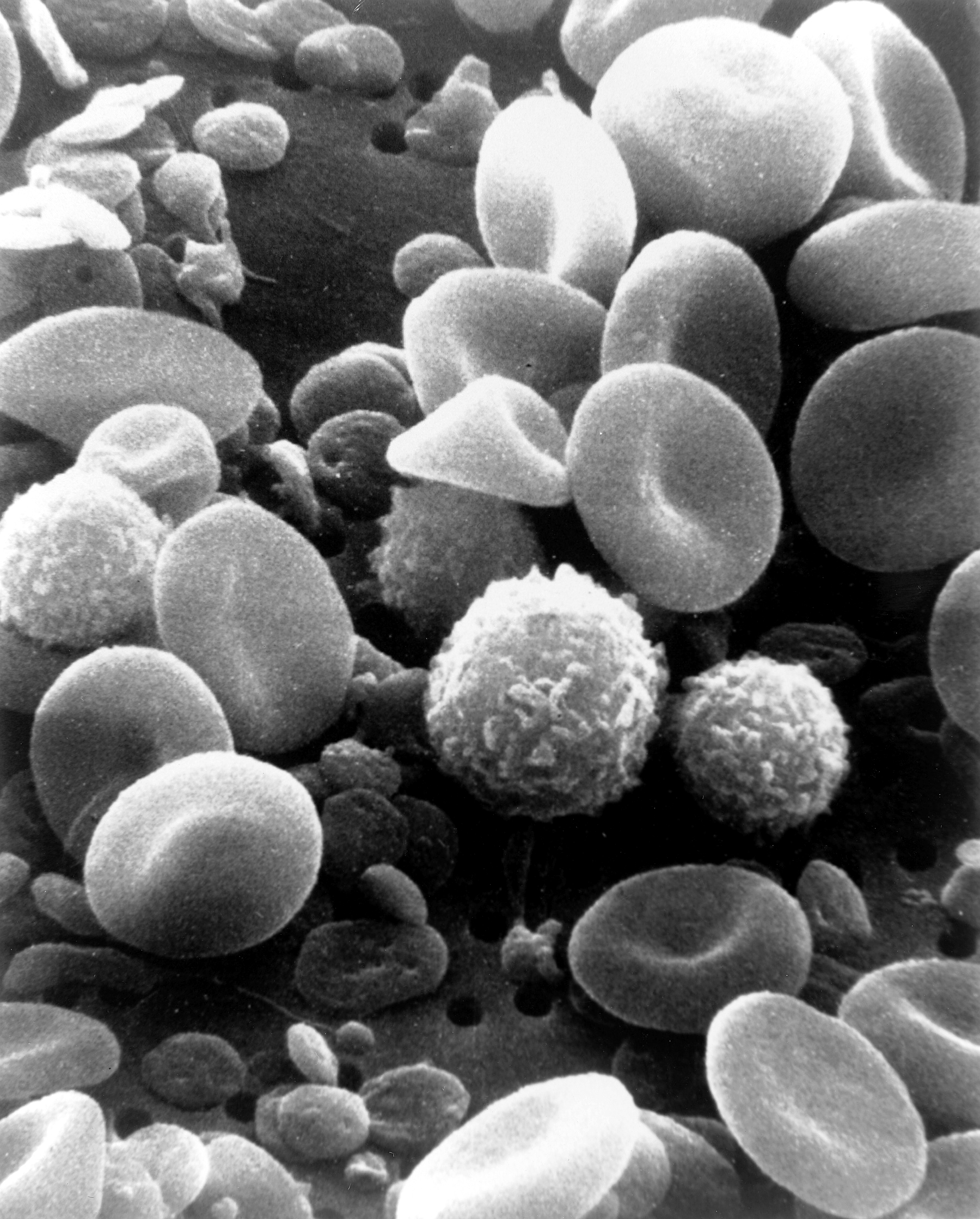
- Red blood cells, white blood cells, and platelets are all derivatives of the CFU-GEMM cell.

Details
- Gives rise to: Myeloid cells
- Location: Bone marrow
- Function: Colony forming unit

Identifiers
- TH: H2.00.04.3.02008

CFU-GEMM is a colony forming unit that generates myeloid cells. CFU-GEMM cells are the oligopotential progenitor cells for myeloid cells; they are thus also called common myeloid progenitor cells or myeloid stem cells. "GEMM" stands for granulocyte, erythrocyte, monocyte, megakaryocyte.

The common myeloid progenitor (CMP) and the common lymphoid progenitor (CLP) are the first branch of cell differentiation in hematopoiesis after the hemocytoblast (hematopoietic stem cell).

== Structure ==
In current terminology, CFU-S refers to the pluripotent stem cells that can differentiate into all types of blood cells. CFU-S divides into two lineages: the lymphoid precursor (CFU-LSC) and the myeloid precursor (CFU-GEMM). The CFU-GEMM cell is capable of differentiating into white blood cells, red blood cells, and platelets, all of which are normally found in circulating blood.

It has been suggested that eosinophils do not derive from the common myeloid progenitor in humans.

Chart showing the lineages of hematopoiesis.

In the adjacent image, CFU-GEMM is the scientific name for the "common myeloid progenitor" that is responsible for forming all the cells of the myeloid lineages. As observed in the image, CFU-GEMM is capable of producing a diverse set of cells. It matures into the megakaryocyte, erythrocyte, mast cell or myeloblast based on the presence of specific factors that encourage the cell to choose a lineage to follow.

=== Surface markers ===
Cell surface markers allow the immune system to recognize self and non-self cells in addition to making cell sorting by flow cytometry possible.

The cells are characterized by expressing the cell surface markers CD33, CD34 and HLA-DR. These surface markers are proteins on the surface that are unique to specific cells and certain maturation periods, allowing researchers to differentiate between two different cells as well as what stage the cell is found in its developmental progression.

== Development ==
=== Growth factors ===
The differentiation and proliferation of CFU-GEMM are promoted by growth factors, such as interleukins and cytokines. IL-3 and granulocyte-macrophage colony stimulating factor (GM-CSF) as single factors are equally active in stimulating CFU-GEMM, but the combination of both factors produces additive stimulatory effects upon CFU-GEMM. The growth of CFU-GEMM is stimulated by the stem cell factor, or SCF. SCF has been found also to synergize with GM-CSF, IL-6, IL-3, IL-11 or erythropoietin to increase the numbers of CFU-GEMM.

CFU-GEMM gives rise to CFU-GM (leading to monoblasts and myeloblasts), CFU-Meg (leading to megakaryoblasts), and CFU-E (leading to proerythroblasts). The stem cell will follow a specific lineage depending on the presence of certain growth factors and cytokines. The GM-CSF and IL-3 both work together to stimulate production of all lines. When erythropoietin (EPO) is present, red blood cell production from the CFU-GEMM will be activated. G-CSF, M-CSF, IL-5, IL-4, and IL-3 stimulate the production of neutrophils, monocytes, eosinophils, basophils, and platelets, respectively.

== Research studies ==
Since the CFU-GEMM cell is a very early ancestor of the mature cells of the blood, it is not normally found in the blood. While present in bone marrow, the place where CFU-GEMM is most common is in the umbilical cord between a mother and baby. It has been discovered that these cells have a high replating efficiency, meaning that when taken from the umbilical cord and grown in culture, a high percentage of these cells are able to produce colonies. The results of studies conducted by Carow, Hangoc, and Broxmeyer in 1993 reveal that the CFU-GEMM can be classified as a stem cell due to its high replating efficiency in the presence of certain growth factors and cytokines.

The growth and production of CFU-GEMM and BFU-E depend on stimulatory factors from a source of burst-promoting activity (BPA) such as the release of interleukin-1 (IL-1) by monocytes, a has been studied in 1987. It has also been shown that fibroblasts are capable of secreting these BPAs, however only respond to regulatory molecule such as interleukin-1. The results showed that IL-1 increases the stimulatory effects of CFU-GEMM in a dose-dependent fashion with a maximum efficacy around 140 ng/mL. This study revealed that IL-1 plays an important role in the regulation of the production of stimulatory factors that influence the progenitor cells of hematopoiesis.

In another study in 2014, researchers were in search of molecules to stimulate the proliferation of long-term hematopoietic stem cells (LT-HSC). They tested a library of more than 5000 small molecules, with all except one (UM729) suppressing growth. A more potent analog was generated and named UM171. When compared to other similar chemicals, UM171 allowed for more HSC proliferation and lower apoptotic cell number compared to controls, along with a higher number in multipotential progenitors like CFU-GEMM. Furthermore, UM171 did not affect division rate. When used in conjunction with SR1, a known transcription factor, UM171 allowed for suppression of differentiation and led to increased CFU-GEMM growth. These results suggest that UM171+SR1 together enhance proliferation of progenitor cells and suppress differentiation.

== See also ==
- List of human cell types derived from the germ layers
