= List of immune cells =

This is a list of immune cells, also known as white blood cells, white cells, leukocytes, or leucocytes. They are cells involved in protecting the body against both infectious disease and foreign invaders.

Image	Name	Subtype	Class	Alternate names	Diameter (μm)	Main functions/targets	References
	Neutrophil	Granulocyte	Neutrophil	Neutrocyte; Heterophil; Polymorphonuclear leukocyte	12-15	Bacteria; Fungi	
	Eosinophil	Granulocyte	Eosinophil	Eosinophile; Acidophil	12-15	Larger parasites; Modulate allergic inflammatory responses	
	Basophil	Granulocyte	Basophil	Basophilic granulocyte	12-15	Release histamine for inflammatory responses	
	Mast cell	Granulocyte	Mast cell	Mastocyte; Labrocyte; Mastocytus	8-20	Release histamine for inflammatory responses	
	Macrophage	Monocyte	Macrophage	Macrophagocytus; Mφ; MΦ; MP	20-21	Bacteria; Viruses; Fungi; Cancer cells; Cellular debris	
	Histiocyte	Monocyte	Macrophage	Tissue macrophage; Macrophagocytus immobilis	20-21	Spent neutrophils; General macrophage targets	
	Kupffer cell	Monocyte	Macrophage	Stellate macrophage; Kupffer–Browicz cell; Liver macrophage; Macrophagocytus stellatus	20-21	Foreign debris; General macrophage targets	
	Alveolar macrophage	Monocyte	Macrophage	Pulmonary macrophage; Dust cell	20-21	Carbon debris from lungs; General macrophage targets	
	Dendritic cell	Monocyte	Dendritic cell	DC; Cellula dendritiformis	10-15	Process antigen material and present to the T cell; Messengers between innate and adaptive immune system	
	B cell	Lymphocyte	B cell	B lymphocyte; Lymphocytus B	8-10	Produces antibody molecules	
	Plasma cell	Lymphocyte	B cell	Plasma B cell; Effector B cell; Plasmocytus	8-10	Active B cells that produces large amounts of antibodies	
	Memory B cell	Lymphocyte	B cell	MBC	8-10	Memorizes the characteristics of the antigens; Triggers an accelerated and robust secondary immune response	
	Cytotoxic T cell	Lymphocyte	T cell	T_{C} cell; Killer T cell; T killer cell; Cytotoxic T lymphocyte; CTL; CD8^{+} cell; CD8-positive cell	8-10	Virus-infected cells; Cancer cells; Recruits and communicates with other types of immune cells	
	Helper T cell	Lymphocyte	T cell	T helper cell; T_{h} cell; CD4^{+} cell; CD4-positive cell	8-10	Aids the activity of other immune cells by releasing cytokines	
	Regulatory T cell	Lymphocyte	T cell	T_{reg} cell	8-10	Suppresses the activity of other immune cells to maintain tolerance	
	Memory T cell	Lymphocyte	T cell	MTC	8-10	Memorizes the characteristics of the antigens; Triggers an accelerated and robust secondary immune response	
	Natural killer T cell	Lymphocyte	T cell	NKT cell	8-10	Produces large amounts of immunomodulatory cytokines; Recognises glycolipid and lipid antigens; Pathogens; Cancer cells; Allergens	
	Mucosal-associated invariant T cell	Lymphocyte	T cell	MAIT cell	8-10	Mucosal/barrier defence and maintenance; Recognises vitamin B metabolite antigens; Bacteria; Fungi	
	Gamma delta T cell	Lymphocyte	T cell	γδ T cell	8-10	Tissue surveillance and homeostasis; Recognises various stress-induced antigens; Pathogens; Cancer cells	
	Innate lymphoid cell	Lymphocyte	Innate lymphoid cell	ILC	~6	Secretes signalling molecules; Regulates immune cells	
	Natural killer cell	Lymphocyte	Innate lymphoid cell	NK cell; Large granular lymphocyte; LGL	6-7	Virus-infected cells; Intracellular pathogens; Cancer cells	
