= Mir-BHRF1-2 microRNA precursor family =

mir-BHRF1-2 microRNA precursor family
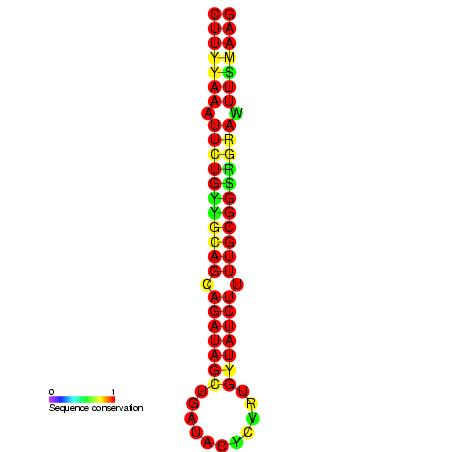
- Predicted secondary structure and sequence conservation of mir-BHRF1-2

Identifiers
- Symbol: mir-BHRF1-2
- Rfam: RF00366
- miRBase: MI0001065
- miRBase family: MIPF0000332

Other data
- RNA type: Gene; miRNA
- Domain(s): Viruses
- GO: GO:0035195 GO:0035068
- SO: SO:0001244
- PDB structures: PDBe

The mir-BHRF1-2 microRNA precursor found in human herpesvirus 4 (Epstein–Barr virus), cercopithicine herpesvirus 15 and herpesvirus papio. In Epstein-Barr virus, mir-BHRF1-2 is found in the 3' UTR of the BHRF1 (Bam HI fragment H rightward open reading frame 1) gene, which is known to encode a distant Bcl-2 homolog. The mature sequence is excised from the 3' arm of the hairpin. Two other miRNA precursors were found in this reading frame, namely Mir-BHRF1-1 and Mir-BHRF1-3.

BHRF-1-2 miRNA is thought to operate as part of a 'miRNA cluster' with two other microRNAs also found in the Epstein-Barr virus genome. BHRF-1-2 has been shown to be expressed in latency-III infected lymphoblasts.
