= Mir-652 microRNA precursor family =

mir-652

Identifiers
- Symbol: mir-652
- Rfam: RF00872
- miRBase family: MIPF0000333

Other data
- RNA type: microRNA
- Domain: Eukaryota;
- PDB structures: PDBe

In molecular biology mir-652 microRNA is a short RNA molecule. MicroRNAs function to regulate the expression levels of other genes by several mechanisms, with expression levels of miRNAs and respective target mRNAs negatively correlated.

== Lineage ==
miR-652 expression is specific to cells of the myeloid lineage, in this instance to monocytes and granulocytes.

== miR-652 and liver cirrhosis ==
miR-652 serum levels are significantly altered in alcoholic- or hepatitis-C-induced liver cirrhosis patients. They have been found to be down-regulated in the circulating monocytes of such patients, thus supporting the idea of an miR-652 role in the mediation of fibrogenic and inflammatory processes in the pathogenesis of liver cirrhosis.

== Expression in liver cancer ==
Circulating levels of miR-652 show gradual elevation with progression of liver cancer, as is also the case with miRNAs let-7a, let-7f, miR-34a, miR-98, miR-331 and miR-338.

== See also ==
- MicroRNA
