= Myeloid tissue =

Tissue of bone marrow

Diagram showing the development of different blood cells from haematopoietic stem cell to mature cells

Comprehensive diagram that shows the development of different blood cells from haematopoietic stem cell to mature cells in both myeloid and lymphoid lineages.

Myeloid tissue, in the bone marrow sense of the word myeloid (myelo- + -oid), is tissue of bone marrow, of bone marrow cell lineage, or resembling bone marrow, and myelogenous tissue (myelo- + -genous) is any tissue of, or arising from, bone marrow; in these senses the terms are usually used synonymously, as for example with chronic myeloid/myelogenous leukemia.

In hematopoiesis, myeloid cells, or myelogenous cells are blood cells that arise from a progenitor cell for granulocytes, monocytes, erythrocytes, or platelets (the common myeloid progenitor, that is, CMP or CFU-GEMM), or in a narrower sense also often used, specifically from the lineage of the myeloblast (the myelocytes, monocytes, and their daughter types). Thus, although all blood cells, even lymphocytes, are normally born in the bone marrow in adults, myeloid cells in the narrowest sense of the term can be distinguished from lymphoid cells, that is, lymphocytes, which come from common lymphoid progenitor cells that give rise to B cells and T cells. Those cells' differentiation (that is, lymphopoiesis) is not complete until they migrate to lymphatic organs such as the spleen and thymus for programming by antigen challenge. Thus, among leukocytes, the term myeloid is associated with the innate immune system, in contrast to lymphoid, which is associated with the adaptive immune system. Similarly, myelogenous usually refers to nonlymphocytic white blood cells, and erythroid can often be used to distinguish "erythrocyte-related" from that sense of myeloid and from lymphoid.

The word myelopoiesis has several senses in a way that parallels those of myeloid, and myelopoiesis in the narrower sense is the regulated formation specifically of myeloid leukocytes (myelocytes), allowing that sense of myelopoiesis to be contradistinguished from erythropoiesis and lymphopoiesis (even though all blood cells are normally produced in the marrow in adults).

Myeloid neoplasms always concern bone marrow cell lineage and are related to hematopoietic cells. Myeloid tissue can also be present in the liver and spleen in fetuses, and sometimes even in adults as well, which leads to extramedullary hematopoiesis.

There is one other sense of myeloid that means "pertaining to the spinal cord", but it is much less commonly used. Myeloid should not be confused with myelin, referring to an insulating layer covering the axons of many neurons.

== See also ==
- Acute myeloid leukemia
- Chronic myelogenous leukemia
- Hematopoietic stem cell
- Lymphocyte
- Myelocyte
