= RARA gene =

Protein coding gene

The RARA gene, also known as NR1B1, is a protein coding gene located on chromosome 17 that provides the instructions required to make transcription factor Retinoic Acid Receptor Alpha (or RARα).

== Interactions and roles ==
The RARα protein interacts with Vitamin A-derived retinoic acid to control the transcription of genes required for many processes involved in early embryonic development including neural differentiation, organogenesis, cardiogenesis, and limb development. It also plays an important role in the development of the immune system by inducing T-regulatory cells, promoting tolerance, and controlling the differentiation of immature immune cells in the bone marrow called promyelocytes into mature white blood cells.

== Defects ==
RARA’s role in the developing immune system leaves it subject to possible defects, the most common of which is a condition known as Acute Promyeloid Leukemia (APL) caused by a somatic mutation described by the fusion of RARA and the PML gene located on chromosome 15. This fusion results in the formation of the protein complex PML-RARα Under normal circumstances, PML produces a tumor suppressing protein that works by inhibiting uncontrolled rapid cell growth. When the two proteins fuse together, their normal functions are hindered, resulting in the accumulation of promyelocytes in the bone marrow unable to differentiate past this immature phase. This fusion makes up for the cause of 98% of APL cases, with some other rare mutations and fusions making up the other 2%. Current treatment approaches include all-trans-retinoic acid (ATRA) which works by targeting and degrading the PML-RARα protein complex, in addition to chemotherapy and platelet transfusions.
