= Lobation =

Characteristic of the nucleus of certain biological cells

Lobation is a characteristic of the cell nucleus of certain granulocytes, which are types of white blood cells, where the nucleus is segmented into two or more connected lobes. Of the four types of granulocyte, only the mast cell is not lobated.

Lobation is also a characteristic of megakaryocytes in the bone marrow.

Lobated white blood cells
Cell type	Image	Lobation
Neutrophil		multilobed, i.e. having more than two lobes
Eosinophil		bi-lobed, i.e. having two lobes
Basophil		bi-lobed
