= White blood cell =

Type of cells of the immunological system

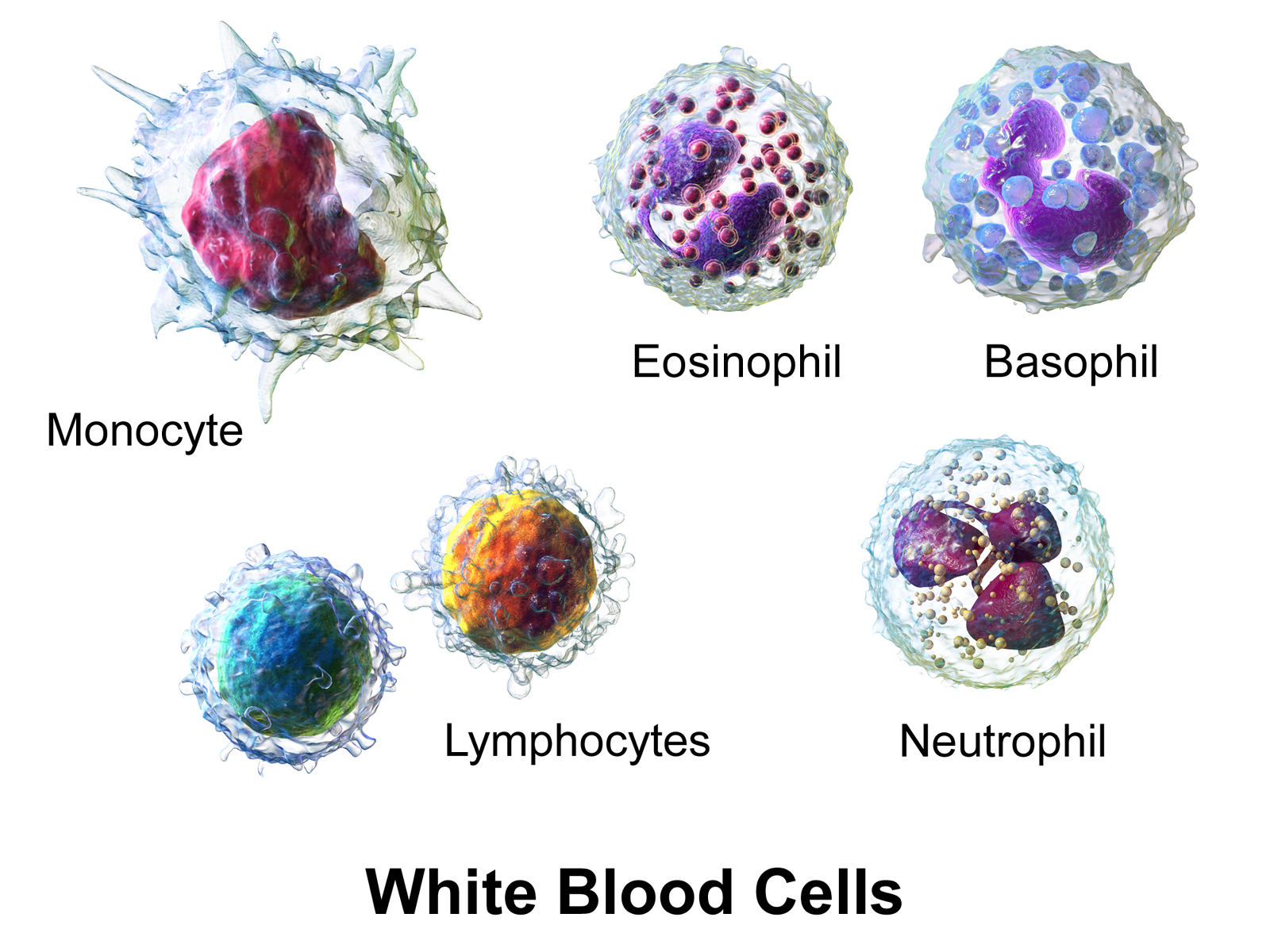
- 3D rendering of various types of white blood cells

Details
- System: Immune system

Identifiers
- Acronym: WBC
- MeSH: D007962
- TH: H2.00.04.1.02001
- FMA: 62852

White blood cells (scientific name leukocytes), also called immune cells or immunocytes, are cells of the immune system that are involved in protecting the body against both infectious disease and foreign entities. White blood cells are generally larger than red blood cells. They include three main subtypes: granulocytes, lymphocytes and monocytes.

All white blood cells are produced and derived from multipotent cells in the bone marrow known as hematopoietic stem cells. Leukocytes are found throughout the body, including the blood and lymphatic system. All white blood cells have nuclei, which distinguishes them from the other blood cells, the anucleated red blood cells (RBCs) and platelets. The different white blood cells are usually classified by cell lineage (myeloid cells or lymphoid cells). White blood cells are part of the body's immune system. They help the body fight infection and other diseases. Types of white blood cells are granulocytes (neutrophils, eosinophils, and basophils), and agranulocytes (monocytes, and lymphocytes (T cells and B cells)). Myeloid cells (myelocytes) include neutrophils, eosinophils, mast cells, basophils, and monocytes. Monocytes are further subdivided into dendritic cells and macrophages. Monocytes, macrophages, and neutrophils are phagocytic. Lymphoid cells (lymphocytes) include T cells (subdivided into helper T cells, memory T cells, cytotoxic T cells), B cells (subdivided into plasma cells and memory B cells), and natural killer cells. Historically, white blood cells were classified by their physical characteristics (granulocytes and agranulocytes), but this classification system is less frequently used now. Produced in the bone marrow, white blood cells defend the body against infections and disease. An excess of white blood cells is usually due to infection or inflammation. Less commonly, a high white blood cell count could indicate certain blood cancers or bone marrow disorders.

The number of leukocytes in the blood is often an indicator of disease, and thus the white blood cell count is an important subset of the complete blood count. The normal white cell count is usually between 4 billion/L and 11 billion/L. In the US, this is usually expressed as 4,000 to 11,000 white blood cells per microliter of blood. White blood cells make up approximately 1% of the total blood volume in a healthy adult, making them substantially less numerous than the red blood cells at 40% to 45%. However, this 1% of the blood makes a huge difference to health because immunity depends on it. An increase in the number of leukocytes over the upper limits is called leukocytosis. It is normal when it is part of healthy immune responses, which happen frequently. It is occasionally abnormal when it is neoplastic or autoimmune in origin. A decrease below the lower limit is called leukopenia, which indicates a weakened immune system.

== Etymology ==
Unstained white blood cell (here a neutrophil granulocyte) surrounded by red blood cells in a blood smear.

The name "white blood cell" reflects historical descriptions of these cells as white or colorless, in contrast to red blood cells. Early investigators described them as "white globules" or "colorless corpuscles". In an unstained blood smear, leukocytes are largely colorless, whereas red blood cells have a reddish appearance due to their hemoglobin content. Leukocytes are therefore generally examined, using Romanowsky stains, such as Wright's stain, to visualize their cellular structures and distinguish between different cell types. This is the appearance generally depicted in literature and other media as well.

The scientific term leukocyte derives from the Greek roots leuk- meaning "white" and cyt- meaning "cell". The terminology emphasizes the relative absence of color in these cells rather than their being distinctly white. In 1851, John Hughes Bennett used the related term leucocythemia to describe blood containing an increased number of colorless corpuscles, explicitly distinguishing this from blood that was itself white.

White blood cells also contribute to the appearance of the buffy coat, a thin, typically grayish-white layer containing leukocytes and platelets between the sedimented red blood cells and the blood plasma after centrifugation. Although this appearance has been suggested as the origin of the name "white blood cell", historical descriptions of white or colorless corpuscles predate modern centrifugation techniques.

== Types ==
=== Overview ===
All white blood cells are nucleated, which distinguishes them from the anucleated red blood cells and platelets. Types of leukocytes can be classified in standard ways. Two pairs of broadest categories classify them either by structure (granulocytes or agranulocytes) or by cell lineage (myeloid cells or lymphoid cells). These broadest categories can be further divided into the five main types: neutrophils, eosinophils, basophils, lymphocytes, and monocytes. A good way to remember the relative proportions of WBCs is "Never Let Monkeys Eat Bananas". These types are distinguished by their physical and functional characteristics. Monocytes and neutrophils are phagocytic. Further subtypes can be classified.

Granulocytes are distinguished from agranulocytes by their nucleus shape (lobed versus round, that is, polymorphonuclear versus mononuclear) and by their cytoplasm granules (present or absent, or more precisely, visible on light microscopy or not thus visible). The other dichotomy is by lineage: Myeloid cells (neutrophils, monocytes, eosinophils and basophils) are distinguished from lymphoid cells (lymphocytes) by hematopoietic lineage (cellular differentiation lineage). Lymphocytes can be further classified as T cells, B cells, and natural killer cells.

Type	Appearance		Approx. % in adults^{See also: Blood values}	Diameter (μm)	Main targets	Nucleus	Granules	Lifetime
Type	(micrograph)	(illustration)	Approx. % in adults^{See also: Blood values}	Diameter (μm)	Main targets	Nucleus	Granules	Lifetime
Neutrophil			62%	12–15	Bacteria; Fungi	Multilobed	Fine, faintly pink (H&E stain)	6 hours – few days (days in spleen and other tissue)
Eosinophil			2.3%	12–15 (slightly bigger than neutrophils)	Larger parasites; Modulate allergic inflammatory responses	Bi-lobed	Full of pink-orange (H&E stain)	8–12 days (circulate for 4–5 hours)
Basophil			0.4%	12–15 (slightly smaller than neutrophils)	Release histamine for inflammatory responses	Bi-lobed or tri-lobed	Large blue	A few hours to a few days
Lymphocyte			30%	Small lymphocytes 7–8 Large lymphocytes 12–15	B cells: releases antibodies and assists activation of T cells; T cells: CD4+ T helper cells: activate and regulate T and B cells; CD8+ cytotoxic T cells: virus-infected and tumor cells.; Gamma delta T cells: bridge between innate and adaptive immune responses; phagocytosis; Regulatory T cells: Returns the functioning of the immune system to normal operation after infection; prevents autoimmunity; Natural killer cells: virus-infected and tumor cells.	Deeply staining, eccentric	NK-cells and cytotoxic (CD8+) T-cells	Years for memory cells, weeks for all else.
Monocyte			5.3%	15–30	Monocytes migrate from the bloodstream to other tissues and differentiate into tissue resident macrophages, Kupffer cells in the liver.	Kidney shaped	None	Hours to days

=== Neutrophil ===
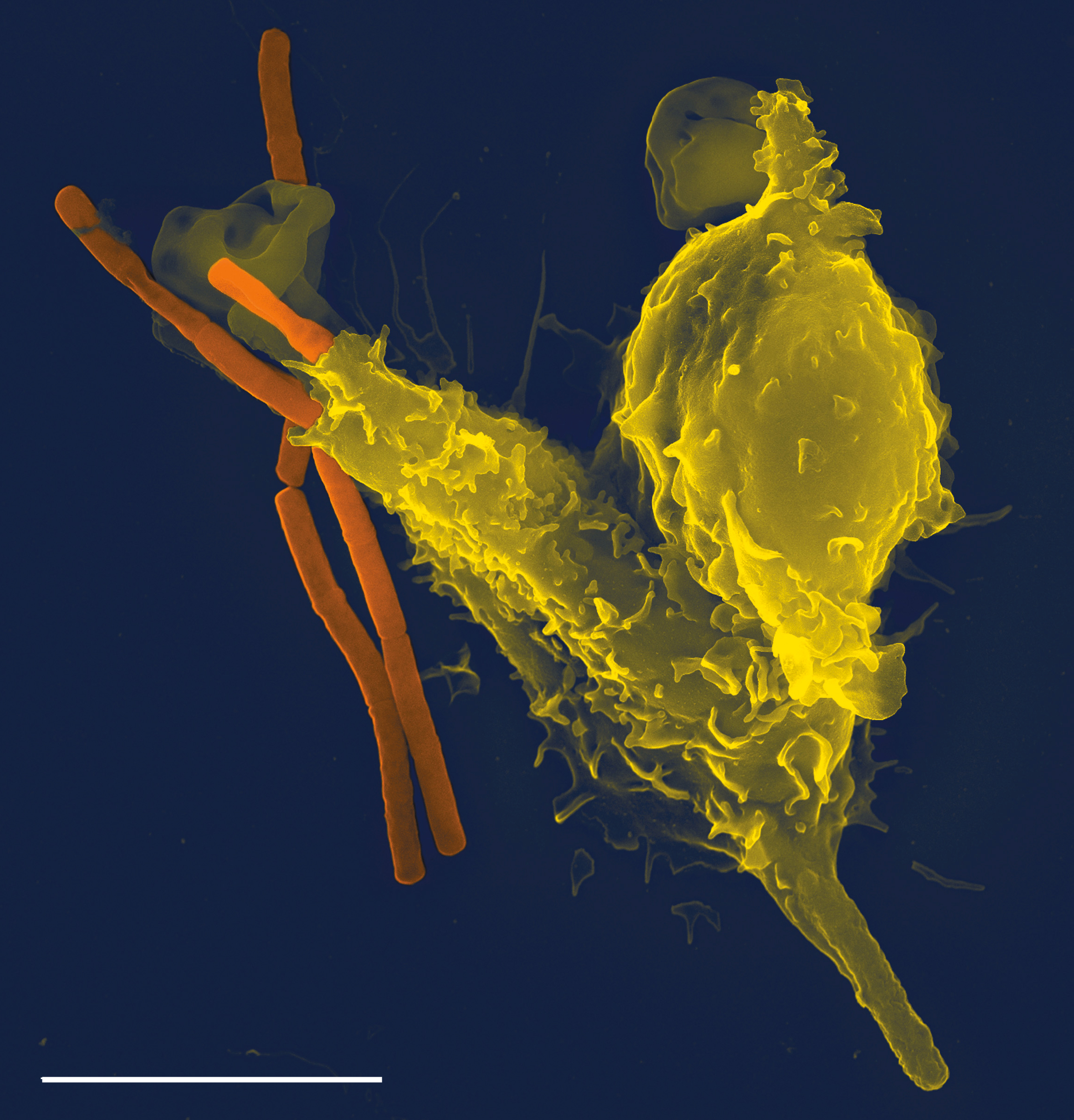
Neutrophil engulfing anthrax bacteria

Neutrophils are the most abundant white blood cell, constituting 60–70% of the circulating leukocytes. They defend against bacterial or fungal infection. They are usually first responders to microbial infection; their activity and death in large numbers form pus. They are commonly referred to as polymorphonuclear (PMN) leukocytes, although, in the technical sense, PMN refers to all granulocytes. They have a multi-lobed nucleus, which consists of three to five lobes connected by slender strands. This gives the neutrophils the appearance of having multiple nuclei, hence the name polymorphonuclear leukocyte. The cytoplasm may look transparent because of fine granules that are pale lilac when stained. Neutrophils are active in phagocytosing bacteria and are present in large amount in the pus of wounds. These cells are not able to renew their lysosomes (used in digesting microbes) and die after having phagocytosed a few pathogens. Neutrophils are the most common cell type seen in the early stages of acute inflammation. The average lifespan of inactivated human neutrophils in the circulation has been reported by different approaches to be between 5 and 135 hours.

=== Eosinophil ===
Eosinophils compose about 2–4% of white blood cells in circulating blood. This count fluctuates throughout the day, seasonally, and during menstruation. It rises in response to allergies, parasitic infections, collagen diseases, and disease of the spleen and central nervous system. They are rare in the blood, but numerous in the mucous membranes of the respiratory, digestive, and lower urinary tracts.

They primarily deal with parasitic infections. Eosinophils are also the predominant inflammatory cells in allergic reactions. The most important causes of eosinophilia include allergies such as asthma, hay fever, and hives; and parasitic infections. They secrete chemicals that destroy large parasites, such as hookworms and tapeworms, that are too big for any one white blood cell to phagocytize. In general, their nuclei are bi-lobed. The lobes are connected by a thin strand. The cytoplasm is full of granules that assume a characteristic pink-orange color with eosin staining.

=== Basophil ===
The movement of leukocytes in the blood, phase-contrast microscopy

Basophils are chiefly responsible for allergic and antigen response by releasing the chemical histamine causing the dilation of blood vessels. Because they are the rarest of the white blood cells (less than 0.5% of the total count) and share physicochemical properties with other blood cells, they are difficult to study. They can be recognized by several coarse, dark violet granules, giving them a blue hue. The nucleus is bi- or tri-lobed, but it is hard to see because of the number of coarse granules that hide it.

They secrete two chemicals that aid in the body's defenses: histamine and heparin. Histamine is responsible for widening blood vessels and increasing the flow of blood to injured tissue. It also makes blood vessels more permeable so neutrophils and clotting proteins can get into connective tissue more easily. Heparin is an anticoagulant that inhibits blood clotting and promotes the movement of white blood cells into an area. Basophils can also release chemical signals that attract eosinophils and neutrophils to an infection site.

=== Lymphocyte ===
Lymphocytes are much more common in the lymphatic system than in blood. Lymphocytes are distinguished by having a deeply staining nucleus that may be eccentric in location, and a relatively small amount of cytoplasm. Lymphocytes include:

- B cells make antibodies that can bind to pathogens, block pathogen invasion, activate the complement system, and enhance pathogen destruction.
- T cells:
  - CD4+ T helper cells: T cells displaying co-receptor CD4 are known as CD4+ T cells. These cells have T-cell receptors and CD4 molecules that, in combination, bind antigenic peptides presented on major histocompatibility complex (MHC) class II molecules on antigen-presenting cells. Helper T cells make cytokines and perform other functions that help coordinate the immune response. In HIV infection, these T cells are the main index to identify the individual's immune system integrity.
  - CD8+ cytotoxic T cells: T cells displaying co-receptor CD8 are known as CD8+ T cells. These cells bind antigens presented on MHC I complex of virus-infected or tumour cells and kill them. Nearly all nucleated cells display MHC I.
  - γδ T cells possess an alternative T cell receptor (different from the αβ TCR found on conventional CD4+ and CD8+ T cells). Found in tissue more commonly than in blood, γδ T cells share characteristics of helper T cells, cytotoxic T cells, and natural killer cells.
- Natural killer cells are able to kill cells of the body that do not display MHC class I molecules, or display stress markers such as MHC class I polypeptide–related sequence A (MIC-A). Decreased expression of MHC class I and up-regulation of MIC-A can happen when cells are infected by a virus or become cancerous.

=== Monocyte ===
Monocytes, the largest type of white blood cell, share the "vacuum cleaner" (phagocytosis) function of neutrophils, but are much longer lived as they have an extra role: they present pieces of pathogens to T cells so that the pathogens may be recognized again and killed. This causes an antibody response to be mounted. Monocytes eventually leave the bloodstream and become tissue macrophages, which remove dead cell debris as well as attack microorganisms. Neither dead cell debris nor attacking microorganisms can be dealt with effectively by the neutrophils. Unlike neutrophils, monocytes are able to replace their lysosomal contents and are thought to have a much longer active life. They have the kidney-shaped nucleus and are typically not granulated. They also possess abundant cytoplasm.

== Fixed leucocytes ==
HSC=Hematopoietic stem cell, Progenitor=Progenitor cell, L-blast=Lymphoblast, Lymphocyte, Mo-blast=Monoblast, Monocyte, Myeloblast, Pro-M=Promyelocyte, Myelocyte, Meta-M=Metamyelocyte, Neutrophil, Eosinophil, Basophil, Pro-E=Proerythroblast, Baso-E=Basophilic erythroblast, poly-E=Polychromatic erythroblast, Ortho-E=Orthochromatic erythroblast, Erythrocyte, Promegakaryocyte, Megakaryocyte, Platelet

Some leucocytes migrate into the tissues of the body to take up a permanent residence at that location rather than remaining in the blood. Often these cells have specific names depending upon which tissue they settle in, such as fixed macrophages in the liver, which become known as Kupffer cells. These cells still serve a role in the immune system.

- Histiocytes
- Dendritic cells (Although these will often migrate to local lymph nodes upon ingesting antigens)
- Mast cells
- Microglia

== Disorders ==
The two commonly used categories of white blood cell disorders divide them quantitatively into those causing excessive numbers (proliferative disorders) and those causing insufficient numbers (leukopenias). Leukocytosis is usually healthy (e.g., fighting an infection), but it also may be dysfunctionally proliferative. Proliferative disorders of white blood cells can be classed as myeloproliferative and lymphoproliferative. Some are autoimmune, but many are neoplastic.

Another way to categorize disorders of white blood cells is qualitatively. There are various disorders in which the number of white blood cells is normal but the cells do not function normally.

Neoplasia of white blood cells can be benign but is often malignant. Of the various tumors of the blood and lymph, cancers of white blood cells can be broadly classified as leukemias and lymphomas, although those categories overlap and are often grouped together.

=== Leukopenias ===
A range of disorders can cause decreases in white blood cells. This type of white blood cell decreased is usually the neutrophil. In this case the decrease may be called neutropenia or granulocytopenia. Less commonly, a decrease in lymphocytes (called lymphocytopenia or lymphopenia) may be seen.

==== Neutropenia ====
Neutropenia can be acquired or intrinsic. A decrease in levels of neutrophils on lab tests is due to either decreased production of neutrophils or increased removal from the blood.

- Medications – chemotherapy, sulfas or other antibiotics, phenothiazines, benzodiazepines, antithyroid medications, anticonvulsants, quinine, quinidine, indometacin, procainamide, thiazides
- Radiation
- Toxins – alcohol, benzenes
- Intrinsic disorders – Fanconi's, Kostmann's, cyclic neutropenia, Chédiak–Higashi
- Immune dysfunction – connective tissue diseases, AIDS, rheumatoid arthritis
- Blood cell dysfunction – megaloblastic anemia, myelodysplasia, Bone marrow failure, Bone marrow transplant, acute leukemia
- Any major infection
- Miscellaneous – starvation, hypersplenism

Symptoms of neutropenia are associated with the underlying cause of the decrease in neutrophils. For example, the most common cause of acquired neutropenia is drug-induced, so an individual may have symptoms of medication overdose or toxicity. Treatment is also aimed at the underlying cause of the neutropenia. One severe consequence of neutropenia is that it can increase the risk of infection.

==== Lymphocytopenia ====
Defined as total lymphocyte count below 1.0 billion/L, the cells most commonly affected are CD4+ T cells. Like neutropenia, lymphocytopenia may be acquired or intrinsic and there are many causes. This is not a complete list.

- Inherited immune deficiency – severe combined immunodeficiency, common variable immunodeficiency, ataxia–telangiectasia, Wiskott–Aldrich syndrome, immunodeficiency with short-limbed dwarfism, immunodeficiency with thymoma, purine nucleoside phosphorylase deficiency, genetic polymorphism
- Blood cell dysfunction – aplastic anemia
- Infectious diseases – viral (AIDS, SARS, West Nile encephalitis, hepatitis, herpes, measles, others), bacterial (TB, typhoid, pneumonia, rickettsiosis, ehrlichiosis, sepsis), parasitic (acute phase of malaria)
- Medications – chemotherapy (antilymphocyte globulin therapy, alemtuzumab, glucocorticoids)
- Radiation
- Major surgery
- Miscellaneous – ECMO, kidney or bone marrow transplant, hemodialysis, kidney failure, severe burns, celiac disease, severe acute pancreatitis, sarcoidosis, protein-losing enteropathy, strenuous exercise, carcinoma
- Immune dysfunction – arthritis, systemic lupus erythematosus, Sjögren syndrome, myasthenia gravis, systemic vasculitis, Behçet's-like syndrome, dermatomyositis, granulomatosis with polyangiitis
- Nutritional/Dietary – alcohol use disorder, zinc deficiency

Like neutropenia, symptoms and treatment of lymphocytopenia are directed at the underlying cause of the change in cell counts.

=== Proliferative disorders ===
An increase in the number of white blood cells in circulation is called leukocytosis. This increase is most commonly caused by inflammation. There are four major causes: increase of production in bone marrow, increased release from storage in bone marrow, decreased attachment to veins and arteries, decreased uptake by tissues. Leukocytosis may affect one or more cell lines and can be neutrophilic, eosinophilic, basophilic, monocytosis, or lymphocytosis.

==== Neutrophilia ====
Neutrophilia is an increase in the absolute neutrophil count in the peripheral circulation. Normal blood values vary by age. Neutrophilia can be caused by a direct problem with blood cells (primary disease). It can also occur as a consequence of an underlying disease (secondary). Most cases of neutrophilia are secondary to inflammation.

Primary causes

- Conditions with normally functioning neutrophils – hereditary neutrophilia, chronic idiopathic neutrophilia
- Pelger–Huët anomaly
- Down syndrome
- Leukocyte adhesion deficiency
- Familial cold urticaria
- Leukemia (chronic myelogenous (CML)) and other myeloproliferative disorders
- Surgical removal of spleen

Secondary causes

- Infection
- Chronic inflammation – especially juvenile idiopathic arthritis, rheumatoid arthritis, Still's disease, Crohn's disease, ulcerative colitis, granulomatous infections (for example, tuberculosis), and chronic hepatitis
- Cigarette smoking – occurs in 25–50% of chronic smokers and can last up to 5 years after quitting
- Stress – exercise, surgery, general stress
- Medication induced – corticosteroids (for example, prednisone, β-agonists, lithium)
- Cancer – either by growth factors secreted by the tumor or invasion of bone marrow by the cancer
- Increased destruction of cells in peripheral circulation can stimulate bone marrow. This can occur in hemolytic anemia and idiopathic thrombocytopenic purpura

==== Eosinophilia ====
A normal eosinophil count is considered to be less than 0.65×10^{9}/L. Eosinophil counts are higher in newborns and vary with age, time (lower in the morning and higher at night), exercise, environment, and exposure to allergens. Eosinophilia is never a normal lab finding. Efforts should always be made to discover the underlying cause, though the cause may not always be found.

== Counting and reference ranges ==
The complete blood cell count is a blood panel that includes the overall white blood cell count and differential count, a count of each type of white blood cell. Reference ranges for blood tests specify the typical counts in healthy people.

The normal total leucocyte count in an adult is 4000 to 11,000 per mm^{3} of blood.

Differential leucocyte count: number/ (%) of different types of leucocytes per cubic mm. of blood. Below are reference ranges for various types leucocytes.

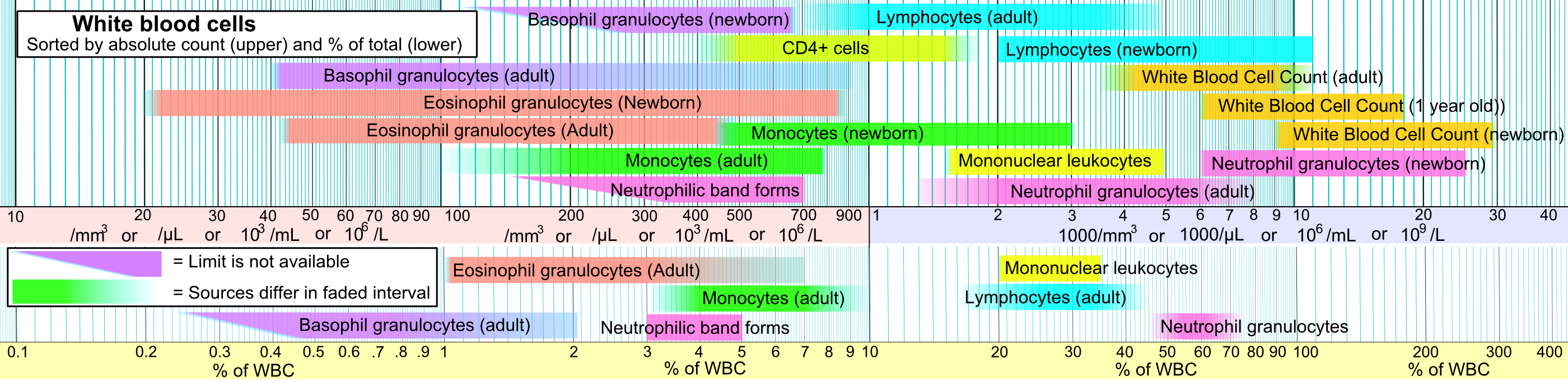

== See also ==
- Leukocyte-promoting factor
- List of immune cells
