= Band cell =

Type of cell

Details
- Precursor: Metamyelocyte
- Gives rise to: Granulocyte

Identifiers
- TH: H2.00.04.3.04011
- FMA: 86471

Neutrophilic band cell

Basophilic band cell

Eosinophilic band cell

A band cell (also called band neutrophil, band form or stab cell) is a cell undergoing granulopoiesis, derived from a metamyelocyte, and leading to a mature granulocyte.

It is characterized by having a curved but not lobular nucleus.

The term "band cell" implies a granulocytic lineage (e.g., neutrophils).

== Clinical significance ==
Band neutrophils are an intermediary step prior to the complete maturation of segmented neutrophils. Polymorphonuclear neutrophils are initially released from the bone marrow as band cells. As the immature neutrophils become activated or exposed to pathogens, their nucleus will take on a segmented appearance. An increase in the number of these immature neutrophils in circulation can be indicative of an infection for which they are being called to fight against, or some inflammatory process. The increase of band cells in the circulation is called bandemia and is a "left shift" process.

Blood reference ranges for neutrophilic band cells in adults are 3 to 5% of white blood cells, or up to 0.7 billion/L.

An excess may sometimes be referred to as bandemia.

== See also ==
- Pluripotential hemopoietic stem cell

== Additional images ==
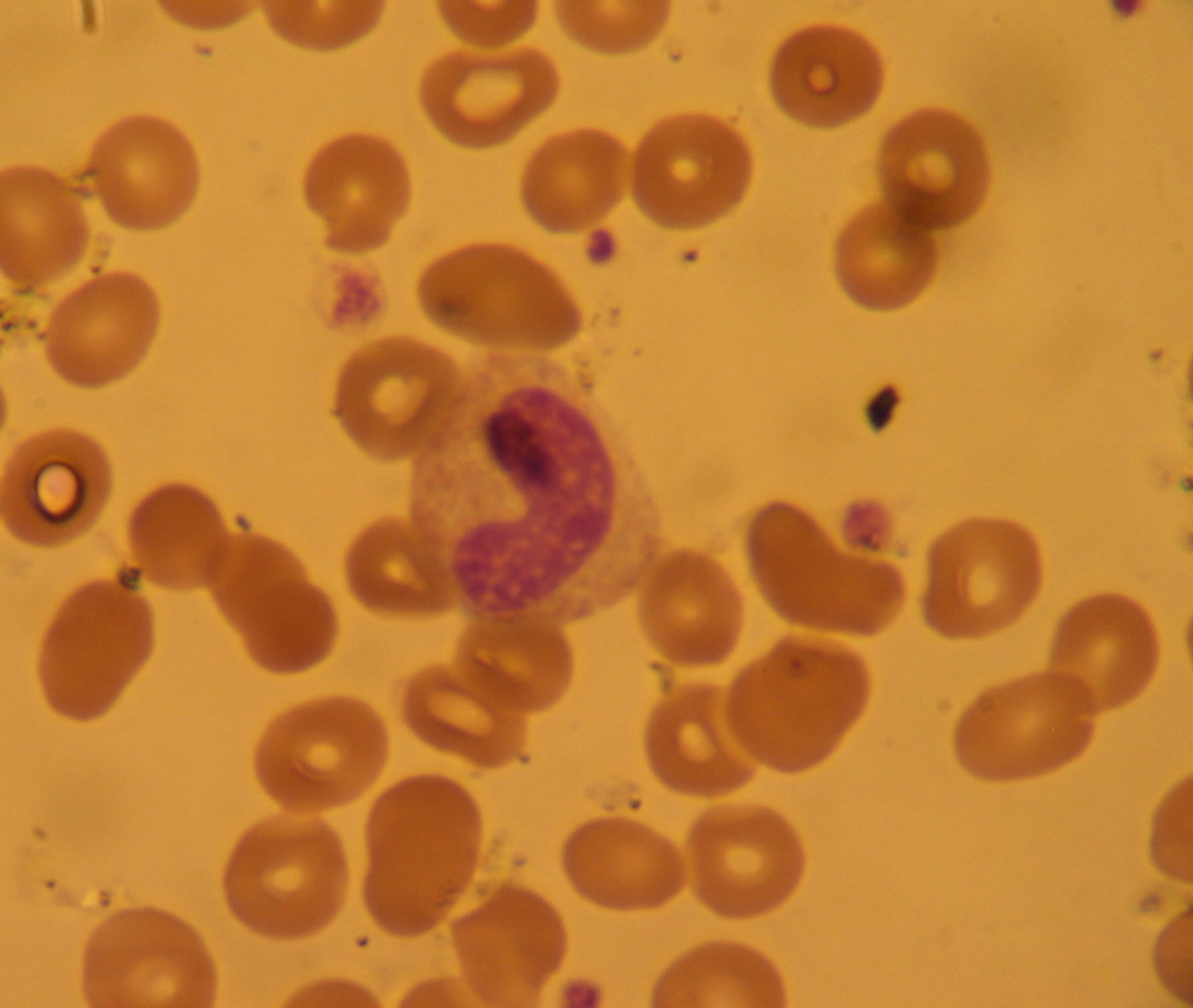
Band neutrophil in peripheral blood film

Hematopoiesis
