= Monocytopoiesis =

Monocytopoiesis is the process which leads to the production of monocytes (and, subsequently, macrophages).

It can be induced by macrophage colony-stimulating factor.

It is a component of myelopoiesis.
