= Proerythroblast =

Precursor cell to a nucleated red blood cell

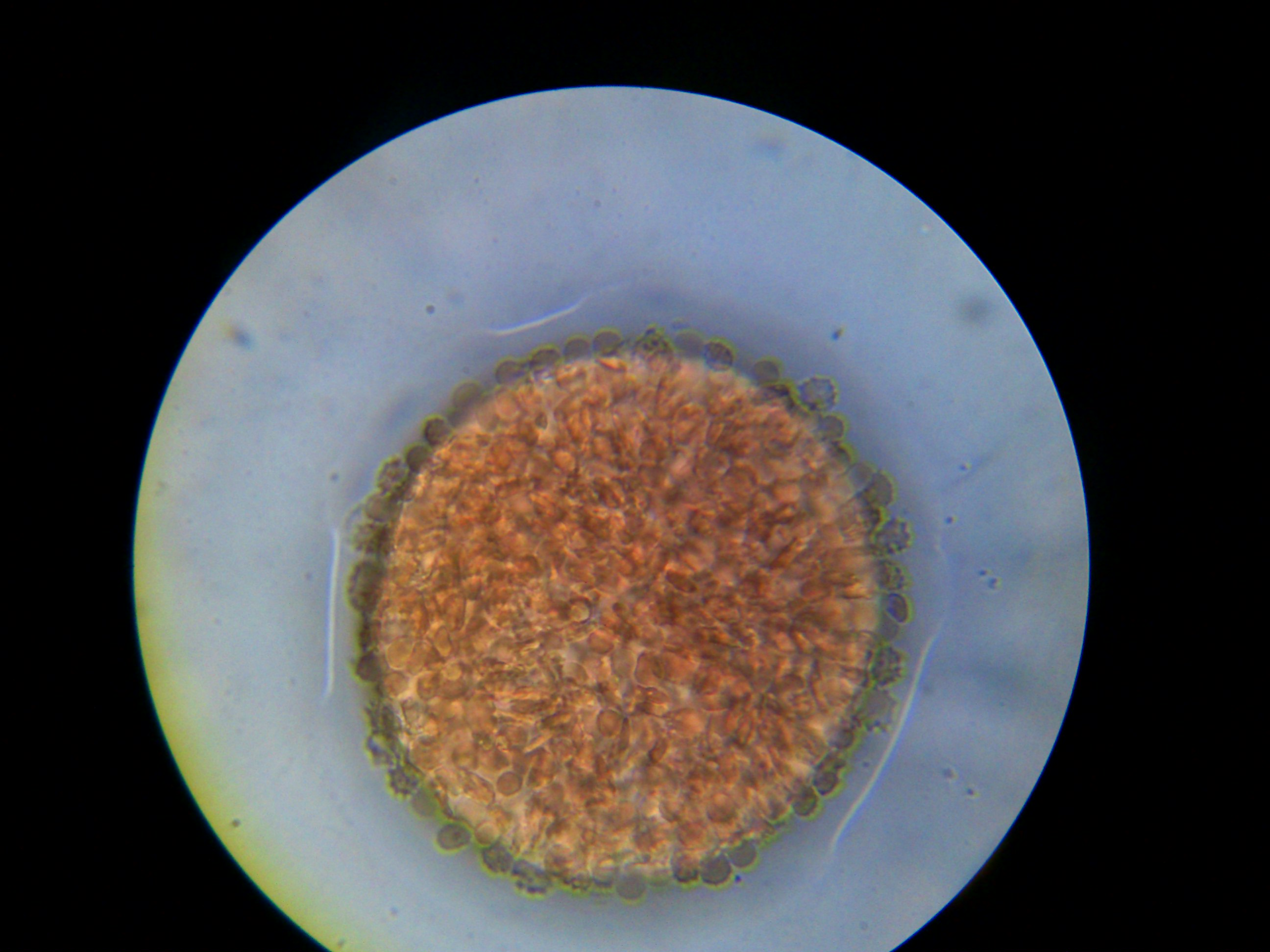
- Proerythroblast

- A comprehensive diagram of human hematopoiesis

Details
- Gives rise to: Normoblast

Identifiers
- TH: H2.00.04.3.03002
- FMA: 83518

A proerythroblast (or rubriblast, or pronormoblast) is a precursor cell to the normoblast (nucleated red blood cell), as the earliest of four stages in its development.

In histology, it is very difficult to distinguish it from the other "-blast" cells (lymphoblast, myeloblast, monoblast, and megakaryoblast). The cytoplasm is blue in an H&E stain, indicating that it is basophilic.

Proerythroblasts arise from the CFU-e (colony-forming unit erythroid) cells, and give rise to basophilic erythroblasts. In the mouse, proerythroblasts are large committed progenitors that express high levels of transferrin receptor (iron acquisition receptor), the erythropoietin receptor (EpoR), some c-Kit (stem cell factor receptor), and are Ter119 (cell surface molecule)-positive. Their proliferative capacity is more limited compared to the preceding stage, the CFU-e.

In vivo, starting with the proerythroblast stage, erythroid cells undergo several more cell divisions while at the same time upregulating survival genes such as Bcl-xL, acquiring and storing large amounts of iron, ramping up the synthesis of hemoglobin and other erythroid genes (in large part a GATA-1 dependent process that is augmented by the EpoR signaling) and decreasing in cell size, eventually removing their nuclei and being released into the bloodstream as a reticulocyte. There are several Nucleoli on the nucleus and it occupies most of the cell volume. the chromatins are consist of a network of fine red pink strands. The distinguished feature of pro erythroblast to its corresponding myeloblast in granulocytic series is that it carries more basophilic peripheral cytoplasm.

== "Pronormoblast" vs. "proerythroblast" ==
Some sources consider the terms "pronormoblast" and "proerythroblast" to be synonyms. However, other sources consider "proerythroblast" to be a parent term, divided into the following two categories:

- "pronormoblast" - normal development
- "promegaloblast" - abnormal development
