= Agranulocyte =

One of the two types of white blood cells

Monocyte under a light microscope (40x) from a peripheral blood smear surrounded by red blood cells.

In immunology, agranulocytes (also known as nongranulocytes or mononuclear leukocytes) are one of the two types of leukocytes (white blood cells), the other type being granulocytes. Agranular cells are noted by the absence of granules in their cytoplasm, which distinguishes them from granulocytes. Leukocytes are the first level of protection against disease. The two types of agranulocytes in the blood circulation are lymphocytes and monocytes. These make up about 35% of the hematologic blood values.

The distinction between granulocytes and agranulocytes is not useful for several reasons. First, monocytes contain granules, which tend to be fine and weakly stained (see monocyte entry). Second, monocytes and the granulocytes are closely related cell types developmentally, physiologically and functionally. Third, this distinction is not used by haematologists; it is an erroneous separation that has no meaning.

Lymphocytes are much more common in the lymphatic system and include natural killer T-cells. Blood has three types of lymphocytes: B cells, T cells and natural killer cells (NK cells). B cells make antibodies that bind to pathogens to enable their destruction. CD4^{+} (helper) T cells co-ordinate the immune response (they are what becomes defective in an HIV infection). CD8^{+} (cytotoxic) T cells and natural killer cells are able to kill cells of the body that are infected by a virus. T cells are crucial to the immune response because they possess a unique 'memory' system which allows them to remember past invaders and prevent disease when a similar invader is encountered again.

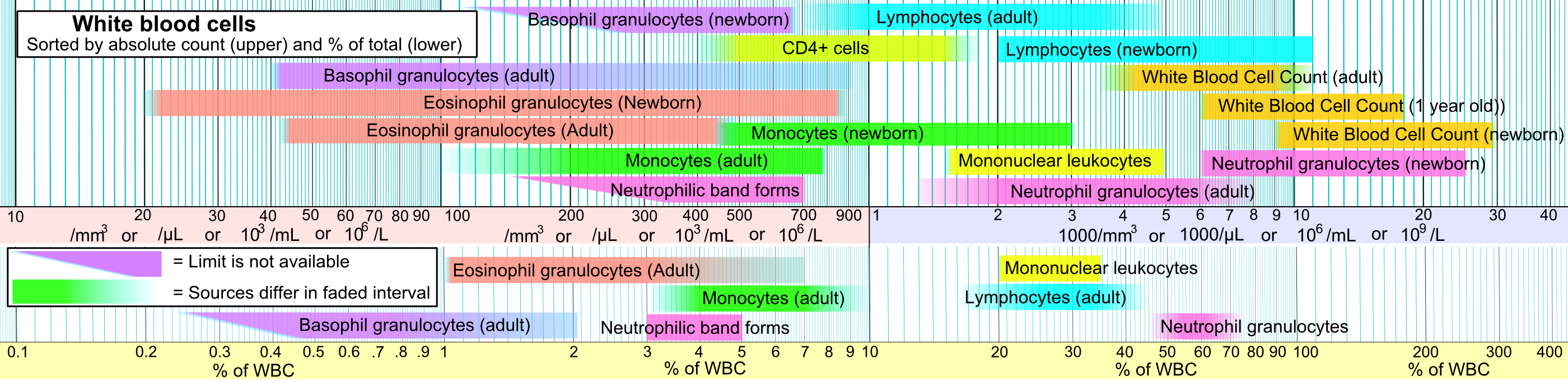
Reference ranges for blood tests of white blood cells, comparing mononuclear leukocytes amount (shown in yellow) with other cells.

Monocytes share the phagocytosis function of neutrophils, but are much longer lived as they have an additional role: they present pieces of pathogens to T cells so that the pathogens may be recognized again and killed, or so that an antibody response may be mounted. Monocytes are also known as macrophages after they migrate from the bloodstream and enter tissue.

The granulocytes are neutrophils, eosinophils, basophils, and mast cells.

== Infiltrate ==
Mononuclear cell infiltrates are characteristic of inflammatory lesions, where white blood cells, mainly macrophages and lymphocytes, collect at the site of injury to help clear away the debris. It is the sign of onset of graft rejection.

== Additional images ==
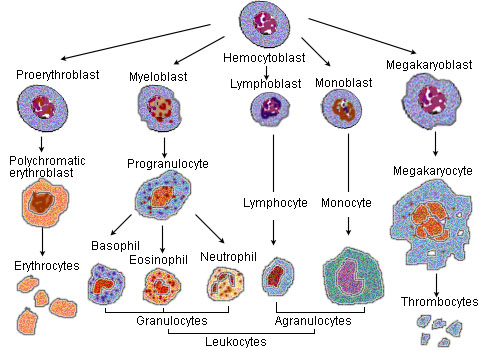
Blood cell lineage
