= Plating efficiency =

Cell reproduction parameter

Plating efficiency ("PE") is a measure of the number of colonies originating from single cells. It is a very sensitive test and is often used for determining the nutritional requirements of cells, testing serum lots, measuring the effects of growth factors, and for toxicity testing.

Plating Efficiency is the number of cells that grow into colonies per 100 cells inoculated. That is, it is the proportion of cells that attach and grow to the number of cells originally plated, expressed as a percentage. PE can be determined by the following formulae:

$$\mathrm{PE} = \frac{\#\, \text{cells on day 1}}{\#\, \text{cells plated on day 0}} \times 100$$

or

$$\mathrm{PE} = \frac{\#\, \text{colonies counted}}{\#\, \text{cells inoculated}} \times 100$$

The first method is more accurate.

Cell growth in culture generally undergoes a decline after plating, and graphically, PE is the global minimum (lowest point) of the growth curve at day one, after which growth rises again. The decrease in viable cells after plating is due to "anchorage-dependence"--cells must attach to the bottom of the culture dish.

Plating Efficiency is one of the parameters typically used to define growth properties of cells in culture. Other common parameters are doubling time ("DT") (which is an average of generation time ("GT")), and saturation density ("SD").
