= Stem cell factor =

Mammalian protein found in Homo sapiens

KITLG
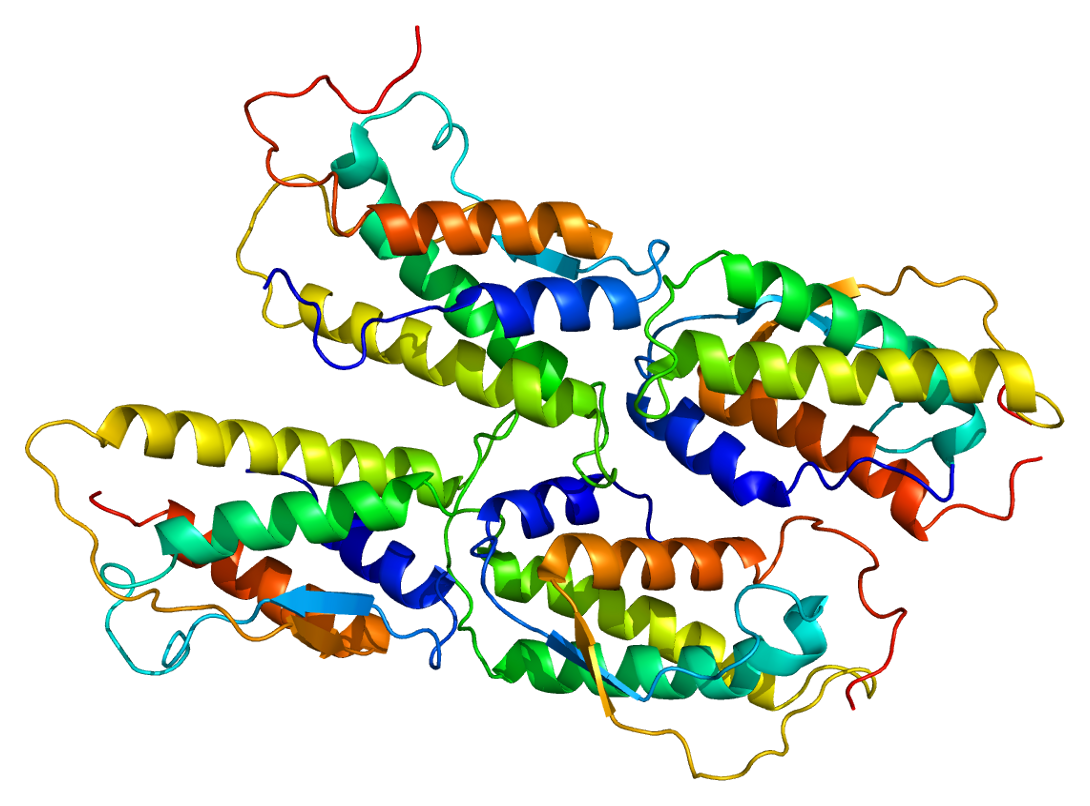
Available structures
PDB	Ortholog search: PDBe RCSB
PDB	List of PDB id codes 1EXZ, 1SCF, 2E9W

Identifiers
- Aliases: KITLG, FPH2, FPHH, KL-1, Kitl, MGF, SCF, SF, SHEP7, DCUA, KIT ligand, DFNA69, SLF
- External IDs: OMIM: 184745; MGI: 96974; HomoloGene: 692; GeneCards: KITLG; OMA:KITLG - orthologs

Gene location (Human)
Chr.	Chromosome 12 (human)
Band	12q21.32	Start	88,492,793 bp
Band	12q21.32	End	88,580,851 bp

Gene location (Mouse)
Chr.	Chromosome 10 (mouse)
Band	10 D1|10 51.4 cM	Start	99,851,492 bp
Band	10 D1|10 51.4 cM	End	99,936,278 bp
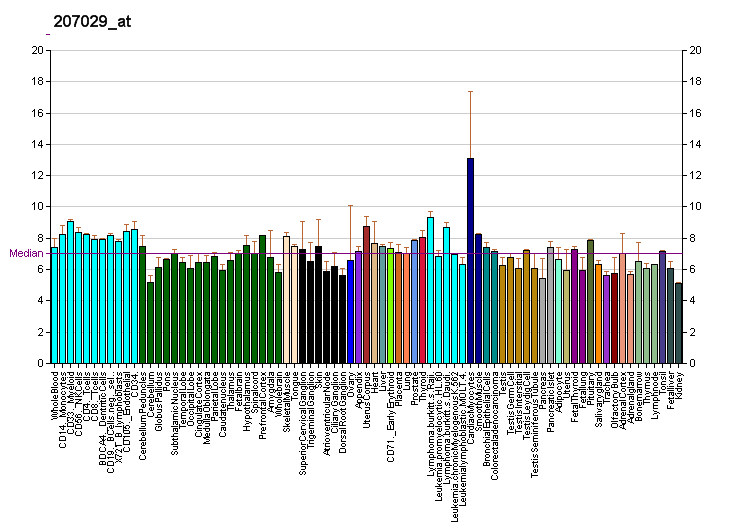

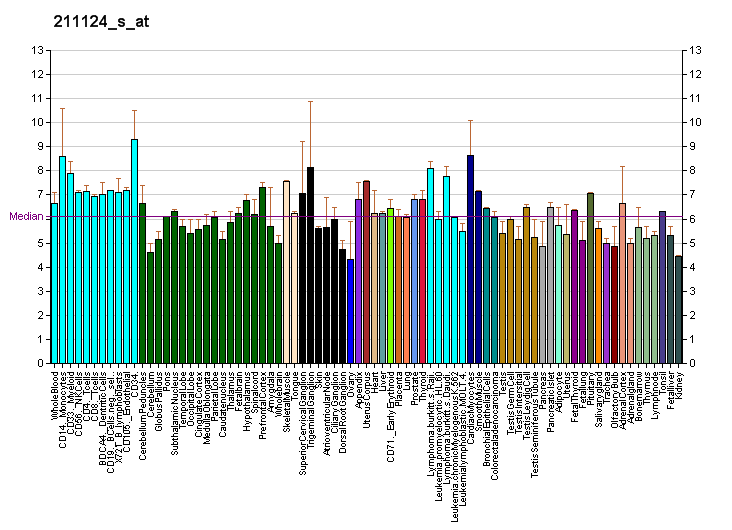
RNA expression pattern
Bgee	Human / Mouse (ortholog); Top expressed in: visceral pleura; cardia; lower lobe of lung; pylorus; lateral nuclear group of thalamus; middle temporal gyrus; parietal pleura; endothelial cell; skin of hip; seminal vesicula / Top expressed in: habenula; left lung lobe; medial geniculate nucleus; medial dorsal nucleus; lateral geniculate nucleus; lobe of cerebellum; dermis; cerebellar vermis; cardiac muscle tissue of left ventricle; right lung; More reference expression data
BioGPS	More reference expression data
Gene ontology
Molecular function	stem cell factor receptor binding; protein binding; growth factor activity; phosphatidylinositol-4,5-bisphosphate 3-kinase activity; cytokine activity
Cellular component	integral component of membrane; membrane; extracellular region; cytoskeleton; cell projection; filopodium; lamellipodium; cytoplasm; plasma membrane; extracellular space
Biological process	male gonad development; MAPK cascade; cell adhesion; embryonic hemopoiesis; cell population proliferation; signal transduction; phosphatidylinositol phosphate biosynthetic process; regulation of signaling receptor activity; positive regulation of protein kinase B signaling; positive regulation of cell population proliferation; ovarian follicle development; neural crest cell migration; positive regulation of leukocyte migration; positive regulation of myeloid leukocyte differentiation; negative regulation of mast cell apoptotic process; ectopic germ cell programmed cell death; negative regulation of apoptotic process; positive regulation of MAP kinase activity; positive regulation of melanocyte differentiation; positive regulation of Ras protein signal transduction; positive regulation of peptidyl-tyrosine phosphorylation; positive regulation of mast cell proliferation; extrinsic apoptotic signaling pathway in absence of ligand; positive regulation of hematopoietic stem cell proliferation; positive regulation of hematopoietic progenitor cell differentiation
Sources:Amigo / QuickGO
Orthologs
Species	Human	Mouse
Entrez	4254	17311
Ensembl	ENSG00000049130	ENSMUSG00000019966
UniProt	P21583	P20826
RefSeq (mRNA)	NM_003994; NM_000899	NM_013598; NM_001347156
RefSeq (protein)	NP_000890; NP_003985	NP_001334085; NP_038626
Location (UCSC)	Chr 12: 88.49 – 88.58 Mb	Chr 10: 99.85 – 99.94 Mb
PubMed search
- Wikidata
View/Edit Human	View/Edit Mouse

Stem cell factor (also known as SCF, KIT-ligand, KL, or steel factor) is a cytokine that binds to the c-KIT receptor (CD117). SCF can exist both as a transmembrane protein and a soluble protein. This cytokine plays an important role in hematopoiesis (formation of blood cells), spermatogenesis, and melanogenesis.

== Production ==
The gene encoding stem cell factor (SCF) is found on the Sl locus in mice and on chromosome 12q22-12q24 in humans. The soluble and transmembrane forms of the protein are formed by alternative splicing of the same RNA transcript,

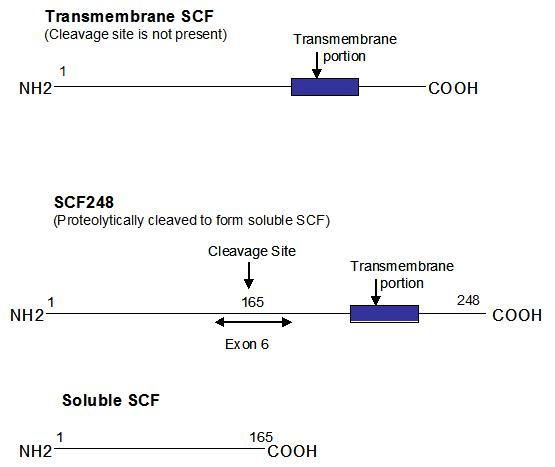
Figure 1: Alternative splicing of the same RNA transcript produces soluble and transmembrane forms of stem cell factor (SCF).

The soluble form of SCF contains a proteolytic cleavage site in exon 6. Cleavage at this site allows the extracellular portion of the protein to be released. The transmembrane form of SCF is formed by alternative splicing that excludes exon 6 (Figure 1). Both forms of SCF bind to c-KIT and are biologically active.

Soluble and transmembrane SCF is produced by fibroblasts and endothelial cells. Soluble SCF has a molecular weight of 18,5 kDa and forms a dimer. It is detected in normal human blood serum at 3.3 ng/mL.

== Role in development ==
SCF plays an important role in the hematopoiesis during embryonic development. Sites where hematopoiesis takes place, such as the fetal liver and bone marrow, all express SCF. Mice that do not express SCF die in utero from severe anemia. Mice that do not express the receptor for SCF (c-KIT) also die from anemia. SCF may serve as guidance cues that direct hematopoietic stem cells (HSCs) to their stem cell niche (the microenvironment in which a stem cell resides), and it plays an important role in HSC maintenance. Non-lethal point mutants on the c-KIT receptor can cause anemia, decreased fertility, and decreased pigmentation.

During development, the presence of the SCF also plays an important role in the localization of melanocytes, cells that produce melanin and control pigmentation. In melanogenesis, melanoblasts migrate from the neural crest to their appropriate locations in the epidermis. Melanoblasts express the KIT receptor, and it is believed that SCF guides these cells to their terminal locations. SCF also regulates survival and proliferation of fully differentiated melanocytes in adults.

In spermatogenesis, c-KIT is expressed in primordial germ cells, spermatogonia, and in primordial oocytes. It is also expressed in the primordial germ cells of females. SCF is expressed along the pathways that the germ cells use to reach their terminal destination in the body. It is also expressed in the final destinations for these cells. Like for melanoblasts, this helps guide the cells to their appropriate locations in the body.

== Role in hematopoiesis ==
SCF plays a role in the regulation of HSCs in the stem cell niche in the bone marrow. SCF has been shown to increase the survival of HSCs in vitro and contributes to the self-renewal and maintenance of HSCs in-vivo. HSCs at all stages of development express the same levels of the receptor for SCF (c-KIT). The stromal cells that surround HSCs are a component of the stem cell niche, and they release a number of ligands, including SCF.

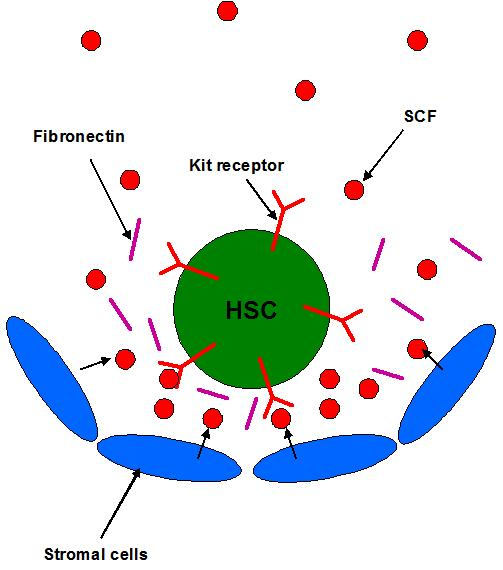
Figure 2: A diagram of a hematopoietic stem cell (HSC) inside its niche. It is adjacent to stromal cells that secrete ligands, such as stem cell factor (SCF).

In the bone marrow, HSCs and hematopoietic progenitor cells are adjacent to stromal cells, such as fibroblasts and osteoblasts (Figure 2). These HSCs remain in the niche by adhering to ECM proteins and to the stromal cells themselves. SCF has been shown to increase adhesion and thus may play a large role in ensuring that HSCs remain in the niche.

A small percentage of HSCs regularly leave the bone marrow to enter circulation and then return to their niche in the bone marrow. It is believed that concentration gradients of SCF, along with the chemokine SDF-1, allow HSCs to find their way back to the niche.

In adult mice, the injection of the ACK2 anti-KIT antibody, which binds to the c-Kit receptor and inactivates it, leads to severe problems in hematopoiesis. It causes a significant decrease in the number HSC and other hematopoietic progenitor cells in the bone marrow. This suggests that SCF and c-Kit plays an important role in hematopoietic function in adulthood. SCF also increases the survival of various hematopoietic progenitor cells, such as megakaryocyte progenitors, in vitro. In addition, it works with other cytokines to support the colony growth of BFU-E, CFU-GM, and CFU-GEMM4. Hematopoietic progenitor cells have also been shown to migrate towards a higher concentration gradient of SCF in vitro, which suggests that SCF is involved in chemotaxis for these cells.

Fetal HSCs are more sensitive to SCF than HSCs from adults. In fact, fetal HSCs in cell culture are 6 times more sensitive to SCF than adult HSCs based on the concentration that allows maximum survival.

== Expression in mast cells ==
Mast cells are the only terminally differentiated hematopoietic cells that express the c-Kit receptor. Mice with SCF or c-Kit mutations have severe defects in the production of mast cells, having less than 1% of the normal levels of mast cells. Conversely, the injection of SCF increases mast cell numbers near the site of injection by over 100 times. In addition, SCF promotes mast cell adhesion, migration, proliferation, and survival. It also promotes the release of histamine and tryptase, which are involved in the allergic response.

== Soluble and transmembrane forms ==
The presence of both soluble and transmembrane SCF is required for normal hematopoietic function. Mice that produce the soluble SCF but not transmembrane SCF suffer from anemia, are sterile, and lack pigmentation. This suggests that transmembrane SCF plays a special role in vivo that is separate from that of soluble SCF.

== c-KIT receptor ==
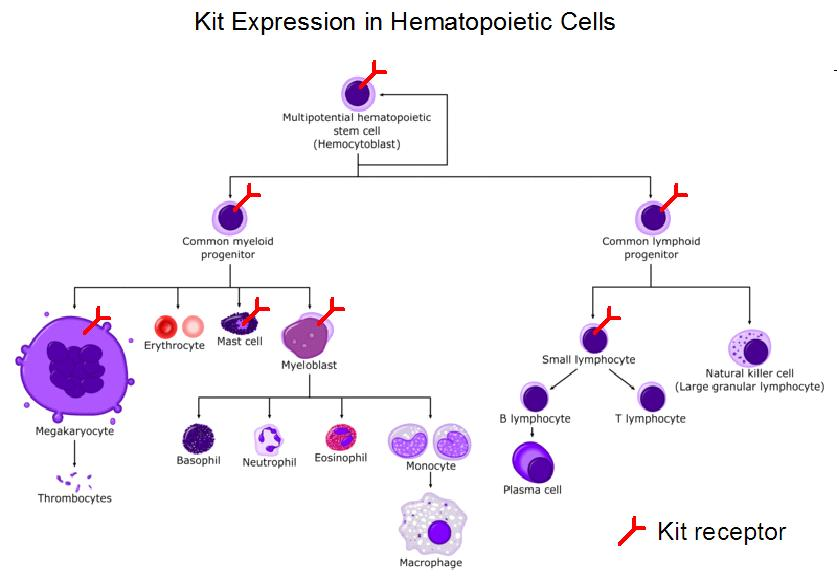
Figure 3: c-Kit expression in hematopoietic cells

SCF binds to the c-KIT receptor (CD 117), a receptor tyrosine kinase. c-Kit is expressed in HSCs, mast cells, melanocytes, and germ cells. It is also expressed in hematopoietic progenitor cells including erythroblasts, myeloblasts, and megakaryocytes. However, with the exception of mast cells, expression decreases as these hematopoietic cells mature and c-KIT is not present when these cells are fully differentiated (Figure 3). SCF binding to c-KIT causes the receptor to homodimerize and auto-phosphorylate at tyrosine residues. The activation of c-Kit leads to the activation of multiple signaling cascades, including the RAS/ERK, PI3-Kinase, Src kinase, and JAK/STAT pathways.

== Clinical relevance ==
SCF may be used along with other cytokines to culture HSCs and hematopoietic progenitors. The expansion of these cells ex-vivo (outside the body) would allow advances in bone marrow transplantation, in which HSCs are transferred to a patient to re-establish blood formation. One of the problems of injecting SCF for therapeutic purposes is that SCF activates mast cells. The injection of SCF has been shown to cause allergic-like symptoms and the proliferation of mast cells and melanocytes.

Cardiomyocyte-specific overexpression of transmembrane SCF promotes stem cell migration and improves cardiac function and animal survival after myocardial infarction.

== Interactions ==
Stem cell factor has been shown to interact with CD117.
