= Metamyelocyte =

Cell undergoing formation

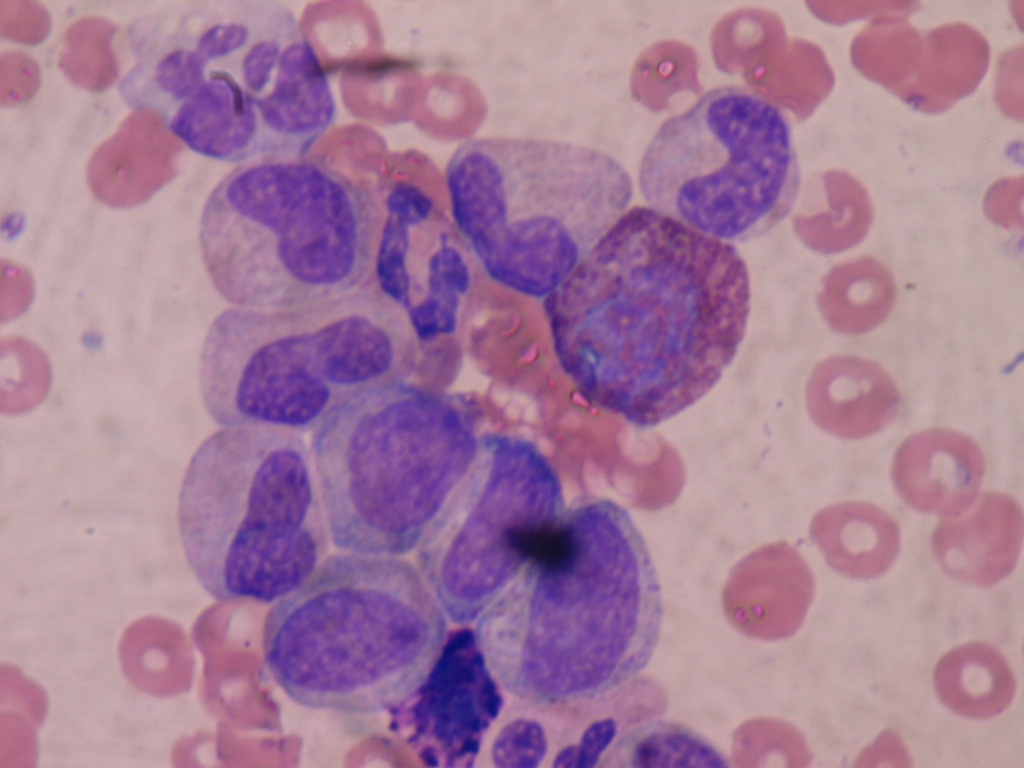
- Four metamyelocytes, center of photo

Details
- Precursor: Myelocyte
- Gives rise to: Band cell
- Function: A cell undergoing granulopoiesis, leading to a band cell

Identifiers
- TH: H2.00.04.3.04008
- FMA: 83541

Basophilic

Eosonophilic

Neutrophilic

A metamyelocyte is a cell undergoing granulopoiesis, derived from a myelocyte, and leading to a band cell.

It is characterized by the appearance of a bent nucleus, cytoplasmic granules, and the absence of visible nucleoli. (If the nucleus is not yet bent, then it is likely a myelocyte.)

== Additional images ==
Hematopoiesis

== See also ==
- Pluripotential hemopoietic stem cell
