= Myelocyte =

Young granulocytic white blood cell

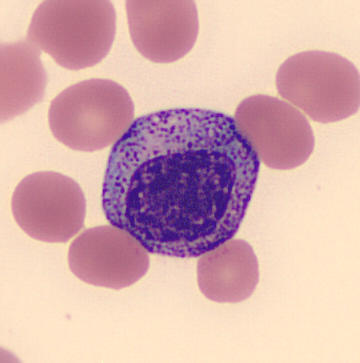

Details
- Precursor: Promyelocyte
- Gives rise to: Metamyelocyte
- Location: Bone marrow

Identifiers
- TH: H2.00.04.3.04004
- FMA: 83525

Basophilic

Eosinophilic

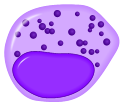
Neutrophilic

A myelocyte is a young cell of the granulocytic series, occurring normally in bone marrow (can be found in circulating blood when caused by certain diseases).

== Structure ==
When stained with the usual dyes, the cytoplasm is distinctly basophilic and relatively more abundant than in myeloblasts or promyelocytes, even though myelocytes are smaller cells.

Numerous cytoplasmic granules are present in the more mature forms of myelocytes. Neutrophilic and eosinophilic granules are peroxidase-positive, while basophilic granules are not.

The nuclear chromatin is coarser than that observed in a promyelocyte, but it is relatively faintly stained and lacks a well-defined membrane.

The nucleus is fairly regular in contour (not indented), and seems to be 'buried' beneath the numerous cytoplasmic granules. (If the nucleus were indented, it would likely be a metamyelocyte.)

=== Measurement ===
There is an internationally agreed method of counting blasts, with results from M1 upwards.

== Development ==
Promyelocyte → Myelocytes → metamyelocytes.

== Additional images ==
Hematopoiesis

== See also ==
- Myeloid tissue
