= Granulocyte =

Category of white blood cells

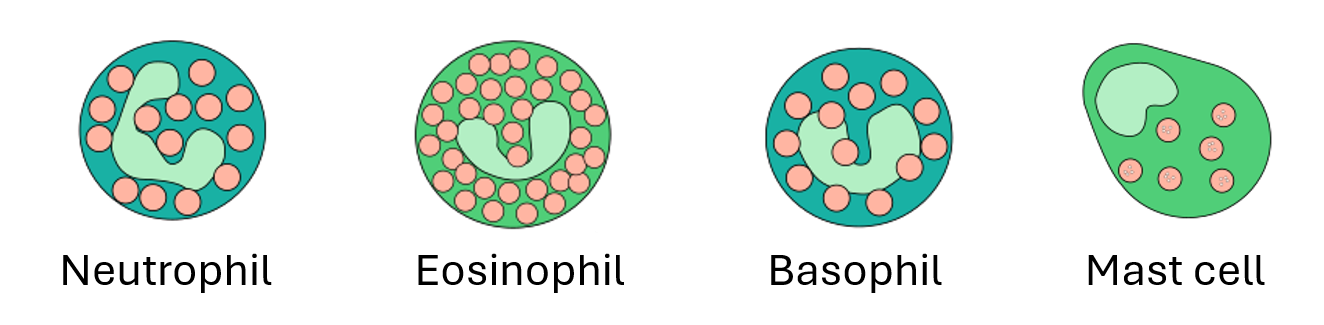
- Types of granulocytes

Details
- System: Immune system

Identifiers
- MeSH: D006098
- FMA: 62854

Granulocytes are cells in the innate immune system characterized by the presence of specific granules in their cytoplasm. Such granules distinguish them from the various agranulocytes. All myeloblastic granulocytes are polymorphonuclear, that is, they have varying shapes (morphology) of the nucleus (segmented, irregular; often lobed into three segments); and are referred to as polymorphonuclear leukocytes (PMN, PML, or PMNL). In common terms, polymorphonuclear granulocyte refers specifically to "neutrophil granulocytes", the most abundant of the granulocytes; the other types (eosinophils, basophils, and mast cells) have varying morphology. Granulocytes are produced via granulopoiesis in the bone marrow.

== Types ==
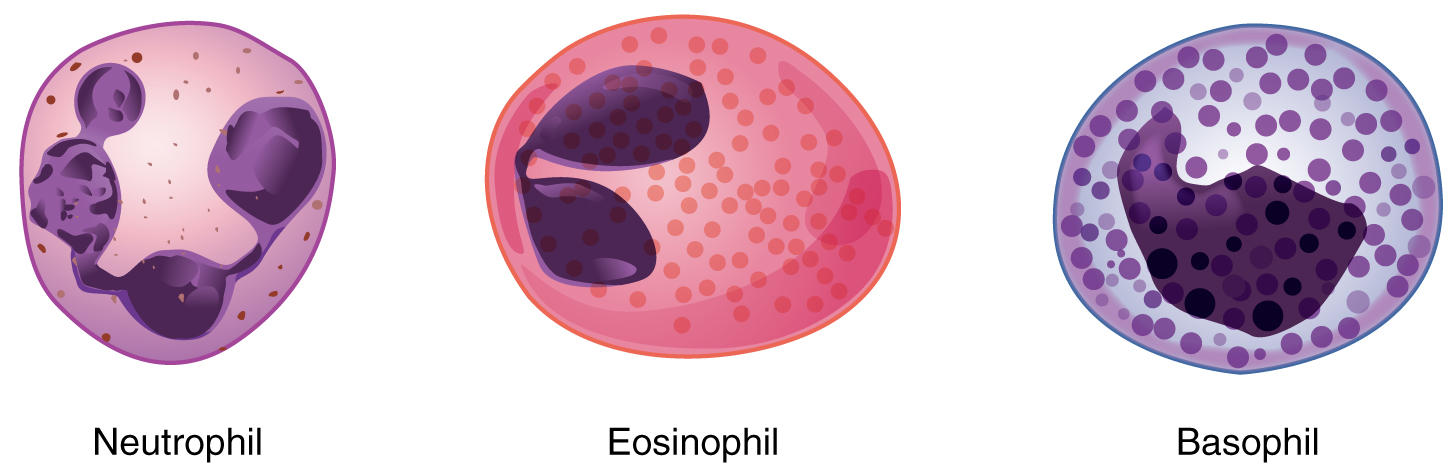
Granulocytes with names derived from their staining characteristics

There are four types of granulocytes (full name polymorphonuclear granulocytes):

- Basophils
- Eosinophils
- Neutrophils
- Mast cells

Except for the mast cells, their names are derived from their staining characteristics; for example, the most abundant granulocyte is the neutrophil granulocyte, which has neutrally staining cytoplasmic granules.

=== Neutrophils ===
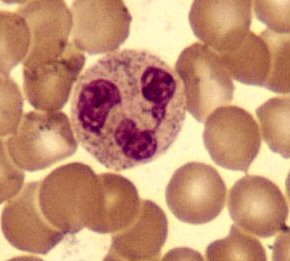
A neutrophil with a segmented nucleus (center and surrounded by erythrocytes), the intra-cellular granules are visible in the cytoplasm (Giemsa-stained high magnification)

Neutrophils are normally found in the bloodstream and are the most abundant type of phagocyte, constituting 60% to 65% of the total circulating white blood cells, and consisting of two subpopulations: neutrophil-killers and neutrophil-cagers. One litre of human blood contains about five billion neutrophils, which are about 12–15 micrometres in diameter. Once neutrophils have received the appropriate signals, it takes them about thirty minutes to leave the blood and reach the site of an infection. Neutrophils do not return to the blood; they turn into pus cells and die. Mature neutrophils are smaller than monocytes, and have a segmented nucleus with several sections(two to five segments); each section is connected by chromatin filaments. Neutrophils do not normally exit the bone marrow until maturity, but during an infection neutrophil precursors called myelocytes and promyelocytes are released.

Neutrophils have three strategies for directly attacking micro-organisms: phagocytosis (ingestion), release of soluble anti-microbials (including granule proteins), and generation of neutrophil extracellular traps (NETs). Neutrophils are professional phagocytes: they are ferocious eaters and rapidly engulf invaders coated with antibodies and complement, as well as damaged cells or cellular debris. The intracellular granules of the human neutrophil have long been recognized for their protein-destroying and bactericidal properties. Neutrophils can secrete products that stimulate monocytes and macrophages; these secretions increase phagocytosis and the formation of reactive oxygen compounds involved in intracellular killing.

Neutrophils have two types of granules; primary (azurophilic) granules (found in young cells) and secondary (specific) granules (which are found in more mature cells). Primary granules contain cationic proteins and defensins that are used to kill bacteria, proteolytic enzymes and cathepsin G to break down (bacterial) proteins, lysozyme to break down bacterial cell walls, and myeloperoxidase (used to generate toxic bacteria-killing substances). In addition, secretions from the primary granules of neutrophils stimulate the phagocytosis of IgG antibody-coated bacteria. The secondary granules contain compounds that are involved in the formation of toxic oxygen compounds, lysozyme, and lactoferrin (used to take essential iron from bacteria). Neutrophil extracellular traps (NETs) comprise a web of fibers composed of chromatin and serine proteases that trap and kill microbes extracellularly. Trapping of bacteria is a particularly important role for NETs in sepsis, where NET are formed within blood vessels.

=== Eosinophils ===
Eosinophils also have kidney-shaped lobed nuclei (two to four lobes). The number of granules in an eosinophil can vary because they have a tendency to degranulate while in the blood stream. Eosinophils play a crucial part in the killing of parasites (e.g., enteric nematodes) because their granules contain a unique, toxic basic protein and cationic protein (e.g., cathepsin); receptors that bind to IgG and IgA are used to help with this task. These cells also have a limited ability to participate in phagocytosis, they are professional antigen-presenting cells, they regulate other immune cell functions (e.g., CD4+ T cell, dendritic cell, B cell, mast cell, neutrophil, and basophil functions), they are involved in the destruction of tumor cells, and they promote the repair of damaged tissue. A polypeptide called interleukin-5 interacts with eosinophils and causes them to grow and differentiate; this polypeptide is produced by basophils and by T-helper 2 cells (TH2).

=== Basophils ===
Basophils are one of the least abundant cells in bone marrow and blood (occurring at less than two percent of all cells). Like neutrophils and eosinophils, they have lobed nuclei; however, they have only two lobes, and the chromatin filaments that connect them are not very visible. Basophils have receptors that can bind to IgE, IgG, complement, and histamine. The cytoplasm of basophils contains a varied amount of granules; these granules are usually numerous enough to partially conceal the nucleus. Granule contents of basophils are abundant with histamine, heparin, chondroitin sulfate, peroxidase, platelet-activating factor, and other substances.

When an infection occurs, mature basophils will be released from the bone marrow and travel to the site of infection. When basophils are injured, they will release histamine, which contributes to the inflammatory response that helps fight invading organisms. Histamine causes dilation and increased permeability of capillaries close to the basophil. Injured basophils and other leukocytes will release another substance called prostaglandins that contributes to an increased blood flow to the site of infection. Both of these mechanisms allow blood-clotting elements to be delivered to the infected area (this begins the recovery process and blocks the travel of microbes to other parts of the body). Increased permeability of the inflamed tissue also allows for more phagocyte migration to the site of infection so that they can consume microbes.

=== Mast cells ===
Mast cells are a type of granulocyte that are present in tissues; they mediate host defense against pathogens (e.g., parasites) and allergic reactions, particularly anaphylaxis. Mast cells are also involved in mediating inflammation and autoimmunity as well as mediating and regulating neuroimmune system responses.

== Development ==
Granulocytes are derived from stem cells residing in the bone marrow. The differentiation of these stem cells from multipotent hematopoietic stem cell into granulocytes is termed granulopoiesis. Multiple intermediate cell types exist in this differentiation process, including myeloblasts and promyelocytes.

== Function ==
=== Granule contents ===
Examples of toxic materials produced or released by degranulation by granulocytes on the ingestion of microorganisms are:

- Antimicrobial agents (Defensins and Eosinophil cationic protein)
- Enzymes
  - Lysozyme: dissolves cell walls of some gram-positive bacteria
  - Acid hydrolases: further digest bacteria
- Low pH vesicles (3.5-4.0)
- Toxic nitrogen oxides (nitric oxide)
- Toxic oxygen-derived products (e.g., superoxide, hydrogen peroxide, hydroxy radicals, singlet oxygen, hypohalite)

== Clinical significance ==
Granulocytopenia is an abnormally low concentration of granulocytes in the blood. This condition reduces the body's resistance to many infections. Closely related terms include agranulocytosis (etymologically, "no granulocytes at all"; clinically, granulocyte levels less than 5% of normal) and neutropenia (deficiency of neutrophil granulocytes). Granulocytes live only one to two days in circulation (four days in spleen or other tissue), so transfusion of granulocytes as a therapeutic strategy would confer a very short-lasting benefit. In addition, there are many complications associated with such a procedure.

There is usually a granulocyte chemotactic defect in individuals suffering from type 1 diabetes mellitus.

Research suggests giving granulocyte transfusions to prevent infections decreased the number of people who had a bacterial or fungal infection in the blood. Further research suggests participants receiving therapeutic granulocyte transfusions show no difference in clinical reversal of concurrent infection.

== Additional images ==
Hematopoiesis

== See also ==
- Blood count
- Haematopoiesis
- Immune system
- Innate immune system
- Trogocytosis
- White blood cell

== Bibliography ==
- Campbell NA, Reece JB (2002). Biology (6th ed.). Pearson Education. ISBN 978-0-8053-6624-2.
- Delves PJ, Martin SJ, Burton DR, Roit IM (2006). Roitt's Essential Immunology (11th ed.). Blackwell. ISBN 978-1-4051-3603-7.
- Ernst JD, Stendahl O (2006). Phagocytosis of Bacteria and Bacterial Pathogenicity. Cambridge University Press. ISBN 0-521-84569-6.
- Hoffbrand AV, Pettit JE, Moss PA (2005). Essential Haematology (4th ed.). Blackwell Science. ISBN 978-0-632-05153-3.
- Paoletti R, Notario A, Ricevuti G, eds. (1997). Phagocytes: Biology, Physiology, Pathology, and Pharmacotherapeutics. The New York Academy of Sciences. ISBN 978-1-57331-102-1.
- Robinson JP, Babcock GF, eds. (1998). Phagocyte Function —A guide for research and clinical evaluation. Wiley–Liss. ISBN 978-0-471-12364-4.
- Sompayrac, L (2008). How the Immune System Works (3rd ed.). Blackwell. ISBN 978-1-4051-6221-0.
