= Severe congenital neutropenia =

- Other names: Kostmann disease, Kostmann's agranulocytosis, Kostmann's syndrome, congenital agranulocytosis, congenital neutropenia, permanent neutropenia, infantile genetic agranulocytosis, severe infantile genetic neutropenia
- Specialty: Hematology
- Usual onset: Infancy
- Types: SCN1-SCN5, SCNX
- Causes: Mutation in genes, depending on type
- Diagnostic method: Blood test, genetic testing
- Treatment: G-CSF, HSCT
- Medication: Filgrastim
- Frequency: 2-3 in million (2018)

Severe congenital neutropenia (SCN), also often known as Kostmann syndrome or Kostmann disease, is a group of rare disorders that affect myelopoiesis, causing a congenital form of neutropenia, usually without other physical malformations. SCN manifests in infancy with life-threatening bacterial infections. It causes severe pyogenic infections. It can be caused by autosomal dominant inheritance of the ELANE gene, autosomal recessive inheritance of the HAX1 gene. There is an increased risk of leukemia and myelodysplastic cancers.

Most cases of SCN respond to treatment with granulocyte colony-stimulating factor (filgrastim), which increases the neutrophil count and decreases the severity and frequency of infections. Although this treatment has significantly improved survival, people with SCN are at risk of long-term complications such as hematopoietic clonal disorders (myelodysplastic syndrome, acute myeloid leukemia).

Kostmann disease (SCN3), the initial subtype recognized, was clinically described in 1956. This type has an autosomal recessive inheritance pattern, whereas the most common subtype, SCN1, shows autosomal dominant inheritance.

== Presentation ==
Infants with SCN have frequent infections: 50% have a significant infection within one month, most others by six months. Their etiology is usually bacterial, especially staphylococcal, and they commonly involve abscesses, both cutaneous and of internal organs, pneumonia, mastoiditis (inflammation of the mastoid process), and sepsis. All of these are life-threatening for infants.

== Genetics ==
Subtypes of SCN
OMIM	Name	Gene	Chromosome	Gene/Locus MIM number
202700	SCN1	ELANE	19p13.3	130130
613107	SCN2	GFI1	1p22.1	
610738	SCN3	HAX1	1q21.3	
612541	SCN4	G6PC3	17q21.31	
615285	SCN5	VPS45	1q21.2	
300299	SCNX	WASP	Xp11.23	300392

The most common form, SCN1, is autosomal dominant.

Kostmann disease, which is SCN3, is inherited in an autosomal recessive pattern.

Kostmann disease, SCN3, is inherited in an autosomal recessive manner, but the commonest subtype of Kostmann syndrome, SCN1, is autosomal dominant.

A significant proportion of SCN lacks a known mutation. The recognized subtypes of Kostmann syndrome are:

- SCN1 is the commonest form of SCN, which accounts for 60-80% of SCN, and the first to be genetically typified. This autosomal dominant form that arises from mutations of the ELANE (formerly ELA2) gene on chromosome 19p13.3, which encodes neutrophil elastase. Over a hundred ELANE mutations have been found in SCN1. This same gene is mutated in cyclic neutropenia.
- SCN2 is caused by heterozygous (autosomal dominant) mutation of the GFI1 gene on chromosome 1p22. GFI1 is a repressor of several transcriptional processes, including ELANE, as well as miR-21 and miR-196b micro-RNAs which influence myelopoiesis.
- SCN3 is the "classical", autosomal recessive form of Kostmann disease which arises from homozygous mutations in the HAX1 gene on chromosome 1p22.1. About one third of SCN3 individuals also have neurological changes including seizures, learning disabilities, or developmental delay.
- SCN4 is caused by autosomal recessive mutation of the G6PC3 gene on 17q21. SCN4 is associated with structural cardiac abnormalities, enlarged liver, intermittent thrombocytopenia and a prominent superficial venous pattern. A subset of SCN4 has severe primary pulmonary hypertension and respiratory failure.
- SCN5 arises from autosomal recessive Thr224Asn mutation in the VPS45 gene on chromosome 1q21.2. Unlike classical Kostmann disease, SCN5 also has defective platelet aggregation (thrombasthenia) and myelofibrosis. This type is refractory to granulocyte colony-stimulating factor. There is an absence of lysosomes in fibroblasts and depletion of alpha granules in platelets. Accelerated apoptosis occurs in the neutrophils and bone marrow.
- X-linked SCN (SCNX) is caused by mutation in the WASP gene on Xp11.

SCN occasionally may arise from SBDS mutations.

=== Usage ===
Severe congenital neutropenia (SCN) is used as the overarching term for all diseases that affect myelopoiesis most prominently. Kostmann syndrome can restrictively refer to Kostmann disease specifically, or can be used synonymously with SCN as an umbrella term. These syndrome subtypes are phenotypically similar despite arising from different gene abnormalities.

Kostmann disease is a form of severe congenital neutropenia (SCN), specifically type 3 (SCN3), which is a rare autosomal recessive condition in which severe chronic neutropenia is detected soon after birth. The disorder was discovered in 1956 in an extended family in northern Sweden by Rolf Kostmann, a Swedish doctor.

Although mutations of more than 15 genes cause severe congenital neutropenia (in a general sense) not all of these are usually considered as SCN. Clinical usage excludes two broad categories of congenital neutropenia. Diseases are excluded that overtly affect multiple systems rather than impacting myelopoiesis most prominently. Thus SCN excludes the severe neutropenia which can occur in congenital diseases such as Shwachman–Diamond syndrome, Barth syndrome, Chédiak–Higashi syndrome, WHIM syndrome, and glycogen storage disease type Ib. A further group of other miscellaneous inherited disorders, such as hyper IgM syndrome, Hermansky–Pudlak syndrome (HPS), Griscelli syndrome (GS), PN, P14 deficiency, Cohen syndrome, Charcot–Marie–Tooth disease (CMT) can show congenital neutropenia, but lack bone marrow findings typical of SCN.

This group of diseases may also have additional features such as partial albinism, retinopathy, or neuropathy, and are not inclined to degenerate into acute myelogenous leukemia.

=== GATA2 deficiency ===
GATA2 deficiency is a grouping of several disorders caused by common defect, viz., familial or sporadic inactivating mutations in one of the two parental GATA2 genes. These autosomal dominant mutations cause a reduction, i.e. a haploinsufficiency, in the cellular levels of the gene's product, GATA2. The GATA2 protein is a transcription factor critical for the embryonic development, maintenance, and functionality of blood-forming, lympathic-forming, and other tissue-forming stem cells. In consequence of these mutations, cellular levels of GATA2 are deficient and individuals develop over time hematological, immunological, lymphatic, or other presentations that may begin as apparently benign abnormalities but commonly progress to a more serious disorder. A small but significant percentage of individuals with GATA2 deficiency's present with congenital neutropenia. This neutropenia is typically mild, often persists for years, and therefore is not a Kostmann syndrome disorder. Over time, however, the deficiency commonly progresses to include thrombocytopenia, increases susceptibility to infections due to, e.g. atypical mycobacteria or human papillomavirus, dysfunction of non-hematological organs, the myelodysplastic syndrome, and/or a leukemia, particularly acute myelogenous leukemia.

== Pathophysiology ==
The various mutations are responsible for the untimely initiation of apoptosis in myelocytes, usually at the promyelocyte stage, leading to their premature destruction or maturation arrest in the bone marrow. The ineffective production of neutrophils leads to a decrease in the absolute neutrophil count and a subsequent increased susceptibility to infections. There may be, in addition, other underlying molecular/genetic changes producing DNA mutations and genome instability, which contribute to initiation and progression of this disease.

== Diagnosis ==
The diagnosis of severe congenital neutropenia| involves a systematic approach that includes careful clinical examination, such as blood tests and genetic testing, to confirm neutrophil deficiency. This includes checking for specific genetic mutations associated with SCN. Patients with SCN will often exhibit recurrent, severe infections due to consistently low neutrophil counts. Initial diagnostic steps typically include a complete blood count (CBC) to assess the actual neutrophil levels of a patient. Absolute neutrophil count (ANC) chronically less than 500/mm^{3}, usually less than 200/mm^{3}, is the main sign of SCN. Other elements include the severity of neutropenia, the chronology (from birth; not emerging later), and other normal findings (hemoglobin, platelets, general body health). Other elements include the severity of neutropenia, the chronology (from birth; not emerging later), and other normal findings (hemoglobin, platelets, general body health). Isolated neutropenia in infants can occur due to viral infections, autoimmune neutropenia of infancy, bone marrow suppression from a drug or toxin, hypersplenism, and passive placental transfer of maternal IgG.

A Bone marrow biopsy is also recommended to evaluate bone marrow function to remove concerns or rule out other possible hematologic disorders. The bone marrow usually shows early granulocyte precursors, but myelopoietic development stops ("arrests") at the promyelocyte and/or myelocyte stage, so that few maturing forms are seen. Genetic testing is then performed to detect mutations in genes that have been found to be commonly linked to SCN; this includes genes such as ELANE, HAX1, G6PC3, and GF1, which are critical for the proper development of neutrophils as well as the production and function of these hematopoietic cells. Genetic testing is essential to distinguish SCN from other neutropenia disorders. Genetic analysis also provides information on inheritance patterns, as SCN can be inherited in either autosomal dominant, autosomal recessive, or, in very rare cases, X-linked inheritance. These comprehensive diagnostic processes permit precise classification of SCN based on genetic, symptomatic, and clinical analysis, leading to treatment specific to SCN.

== Treatment ==
Regular administration of exogenous granulocyte colony-stimulating factor (filgrastim) clinically improves neutrophil counts and immune function and is the mainstay of therapy, although this may increase risk for myelofibrosis and acute myeloid leukemia in the long term.

Over 90% of SCN responds to treatment with granulocyte colony-stimulating factor (filgrastim), which has significantly improved survival.

== See also ==
- Neutropenia
- Cyclic neutropenia
- GATA2 deficiency
