= G6PC =

Protein-coding gene in the species Homo sapiens

G6PC1

Identifiers
- Aliases: G6PC1, glucose-6-phosphatase catalytic subunit, GSD1a, glucose-6-phosphatase catalytic subunit 1, GSD1, G6Pase, G6PC, G6PT
- External IDs: OMIM: 613742; MGI: 95607; GeneCards: G6PC1
Enzyme activity
EC #	BRENDA	ExPASy	KEGG	MetaCyc
3.1.3.9	↗	↗	↗	↗

Gene location (Human)
Chr.	Chromosome 17 (human)
Band	17q21.31	Start	42,900,797 bp
Band	17q21.31	End	42,914,438 bp

Gene location (Mouse)
Chr.	Chromosome 11 (mouse)
Band	11|11 D	Start	101,258,387 bp
Band	11|11 D	End	101,268,729 bp
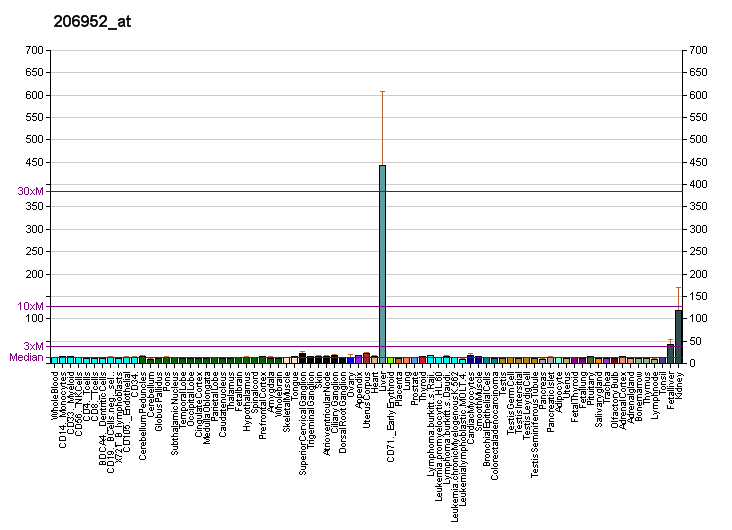
RNA expression pattern
Bgee	Human / Mouse (ortholog); Top expressed in: right lobe of liver; kidney tubule; buccal mucosa cell; jejunal mucosa; glomerulus; metanephric glomerulus; human kidney; duodenum; mucosa of ileum; renal medulla / Top expressed in: right kidney; human kidney; left lobe of liver; gallbladder; proximal tubule; jejunum; epithelium of small intestine; duodenum; ileum; Ileal epithelium; More reference expression data
BioGPS	More reference expression data
Gene ontology
Molecular function	phosphate ion binding; phosphotransferase activity, alcohol group as acceptor; hydrolase activity; glucose-6-phosphatase activity
Cellular component	integral component of membrane; endoplasmic reticulum membrane; membrane; intracellular membrane-bounded organelle; integral component of endoplasmic reticulum membrane; endoplasmic reticulum
Biological process	phosphorylated carbohydrate dephosphorylation; steroid metabolic process; glucose homeostasis; multicellular organism growth; glycogen catabolic process; urate metabolic process; lipid homeostasis; glycogen metabolic process; regulation of gene expression; response to food; phosphate-containing compound metabolic process; cholesterol homeostasis; glucose 6-phosphate metabolic process; triglyceride metabolic process; glucose-6-phosphate transport; gluconeogenesis
Sources:Amigo / QuickGO
Orthologs
Databases	NCBI: entry; OMA: entry
Species	Human	Mouse
Entrez	2538	14377
Ensembl	ENSG00000131482	ENSMUSG00000078650
UniProt	P35575	P35576
RefSeq (mRNA)	NM_001270397; NM_000151	NM_008061
RefSeq (protein)	NP_000142; NP_001257326	NP_032087
Location (UCSC)	Chr 17: 42.9 – 42.91 Mb	Chr 11: 101.26 – 101.27 Mb
PubMed search
- Wikidata
View/Edit Human	View/Edit Mouse

Glucose-6-phosphatase, catalytic subunit (glucose 6-phosphatase alpha) is an enzyme that in humans is encoded by the G6PC gene.

Glucose-6-phosphatase is an integral membrane protein of the endoplasmic reticulum that catalyzes the hydrolysis of D-glucose 6-phosphate to D-glucose and orthophosphate. It is a key enzyme in glucose homeostasis, functioning in gluconeogenesis and glycogenolysis. Defects in the enzyme cause glycogen storage disease type I (von Gierke disease).

== Interactive pathway map ==
Click on genes, proteins and metabolites below to link to respective articles. (Note: The interactive pathway map can be edited at WikiPathways: "GlycolysisGluconeogenesis_WP534".)

Glycolysis and Gluconeogenesis edit

== See also ==
- G6PC2
- G6PC3
- glucose 6-phosphatase
- glycogen storage disease type I
