= Neutrophil extracellular traps =

Networks of fibres which bind pathogens

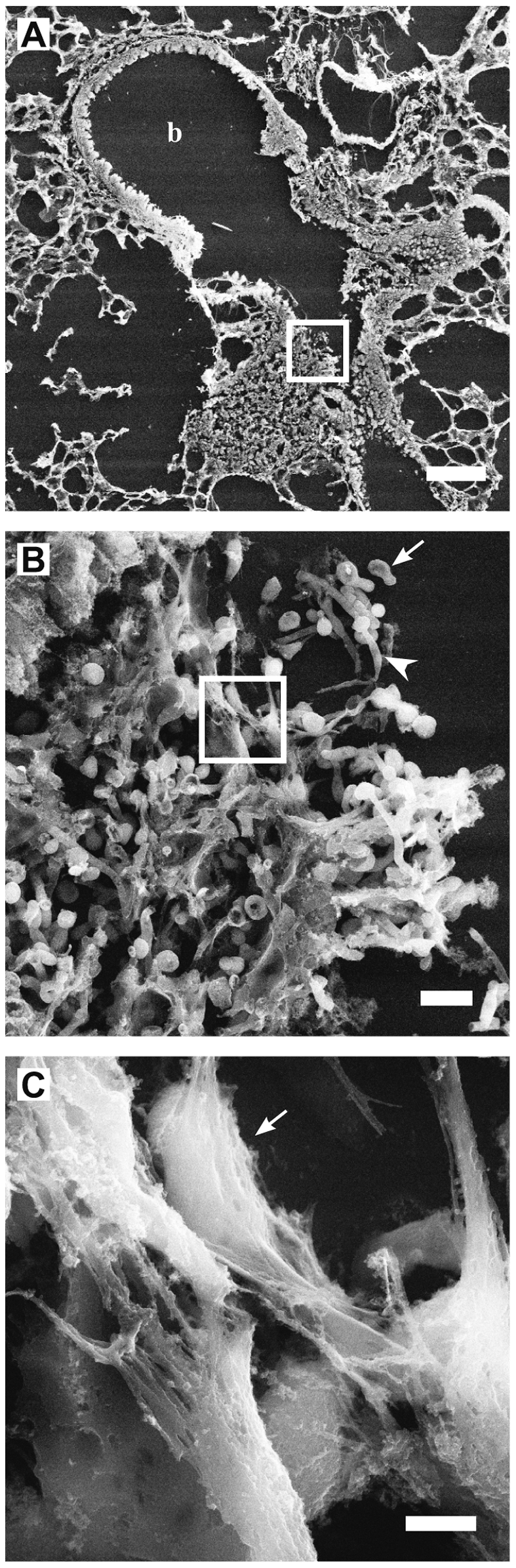
A scanning electron microscope image of NETs engulfing fungal cells (Candida albicans) in an infected mouse lung. (Click on image for more details.)

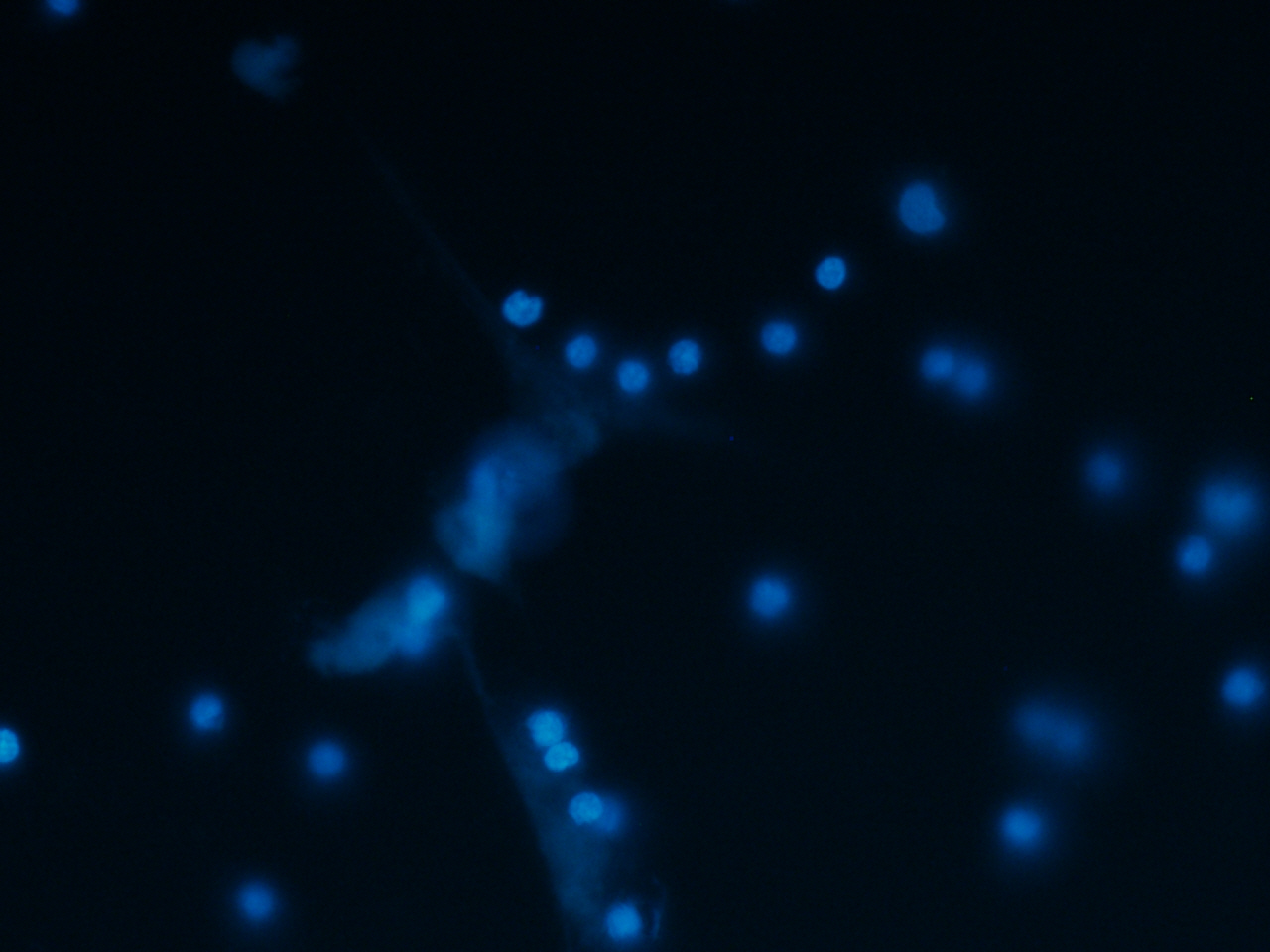
Fluorescent image of cultivated neutrophils isolated from venous blood of human with Alzheimer Disease. Sample was treated with Hoechst 33342 dye that is used to stain DNA. The picture shows the release of DNA by a neutrophil as foggy area in the center of the view field indicating the spontaneous activation of neutrophil extracellular traps (NETs) formation in AD patients that is not usually observed in healthy mates. Magnification x40.

Neutrophil extracellular traps (NETs) are networks of extracellular fibers, primarily composed of DNA from neutrophils, which bind pathogens. In humans, neutrophils are the most numerous leukocyte subset and plays a key role for the immune system. Neutrophils are the body's second line of defense against infection and have conventionally been thought to kill invading pathogens through two strategies: engulfment of microbes and secretion of anti-microbials. In 2004, a novel third function was identified: formation of NETs. NETs allow neutrophils to kill extracellular pathogens while minimizing damage to the host cells. Upon in vitro activation with the pharmacological agent phorbol myristate acetate (PMA), Interleukin 8 (IL-8) or lipopolysaccharide (LPS), neutrophils release granule proteins and chromatin to form an extracellular fibril matrix known as NET through an active process. NETs are essential under physiological and pathological conditions giving them both cytotoxic and anti-microbial features.

== Structure and composition ==
NETs are composed of various components including histones, DNA strands, fibrin, activated platelets, coagulation factors such as tissue factor (TF) and factor XII. Together with content from their azurophilic granules, such as neutrophil elastase (NE) and myeloperoxidase (MPO) neutrophils can externalize their decondensed chromatin.

High-resolution scanning electron microscopy has shown that NETs consist of stretches of DNA and globular protein domains with diameters of 15–17 nm and 25 nm, respectively. These aggregate into larger threads with a diameter of 50 nm. However, under flow conditions, NETs can form much larger structures, reaching hundreds of nanometers in length and width.

Analysis by immunofluorescence corroborated that NETs contain proteins from azurophilic granules (neutrophil elastase, cathepsin G and myeloperoxidase), specific granules (lactoferrin), tertiary granules (gelatinase), and the cytoplasm; however, CD63, actin, tubulin and various other cytoplasmatic proteins are not present in NETs.

== Anti-microbial activity ==
NETs disarm pathogens by using antimicrobial proteins such as neutrophil elastase, cathepsin G and histones, which have a high affinity for DNA. NETs provide for a high local concentration of antimicrobial components and bind, disarm and kill microbes extracellularly, independently of phagocytic uptake. In addition to their antimicrobial properties, NETs may serve as a physical barrier that prevents further spread of the pathogens. Furthermore, delivering the granule proteins into NETs may keep potentially injurious proteins like proteases from diffusing away and inducing damage in tissue adjacent to the site of inflammation. NET formation has also been shown to augment macrophage bactericidal activity in response to multiple bacterial pathogens.

More recently, it has also been shown that not only bacteria but also pathogenic fungi such as Candida albicans induce neutrophils to form NETs that capture and kill C. albicans hyphal as well as yeast-form cells. NETs have also been documented in association with Plasmodium falciparum infections in children.

While it was originally proposed that NETs would be formed in tissues at a site of bacterial/yeast infection, NETs have also been shown to form within blood vessels during sepsis (specifically in the lung capillaries and liver sinusoids). Intra-vascular NET formation is tightly controlled and is regulated by platelets, which sense severe infection via platelet TLR4 and then bind to and activate neutrophils to form NETs. Platelet-induced NET formation occurs very rapidly (in minutes) and may or may not result in death of the neutrophils. NETs formed in blood vessels can catch circulating bacteria as they pass through the vessels. Trapping of bacteria under flow has been imaged directly in flow chambers in vitro and intravital microscopy demonstrated that bacterial trapping occurs in the liver sinusoids and lung capillaries (sites where platelets bind neutrophils).

== NETosis ==
NET activation and release, or NETosis, is a dynamic process that can come in two forms, suicidal and vital NETosis. Overall, many of the key components of the process are similar for both types of NETosis, however, there are key differences in stimuli, timing, and ultimate result.

=== Activation pathway ===
The full NETosis activation pathway is still under investigation but a few key proteins have been identified and slowly a full picture of the pathway is emerging. The process is thought to begin with NADPH oxidase activation of protein-arginine deiminase 4 (PAD4) via reactive oxygen species (ROS) intermediaries. PAD4 is responsible for the citrullination of histones in the neutrophil, resulting in decondensation of chromatin. A NADPH oxidase–independent form of NETosis, relying solely on mitochondrial-derived ROS, has also been described. Azurophilic granule proteins such as myeloperoxidase (MPO) and neutrophil elastase (NE) then enter the nucleus and further the decondensation process, resulting in the rupture of the nuclear envelope. The uncondensed chromatin enters the cytoplasm where additional granule and cytoplasmic proteins are added to the early-stage NET. The result of the process then depends on which NETosis pathway is activated.

=== Suicidal NETosis ===
Suicidal NETosis was first described in a 2007 study that noted that the release of NETs resulted in neutrophil death through a different pathway than apoptosis or necrosis. In suicidal NETosis, the intracellular NET formation is followed by the rupture of the plasma membrane, releasing it into the extracellular space. This NETosis pathway can be initiated through activation of toll-like receptors (TLRs), Fc receptors, and complement receptors with various ligands such as antibodies, phorbol 12-myristate 13-acetate (PMA), and so on. The current understanding is that upon activation of these receptors, downstream signaling results in the release of calcium from the endoplasmic reticulum. This intracellular influx of calcium in turn activates NADPH oxidase, resulting in activation of the NETosis pathway as described above. Of note, suicidal NETosis can take hours, even with high levels of PMA stimulation, while vital NETosis can be completed in a matter of minutes.

=== Vital NETosis ===
Vital NETosis can be stimulated by bacterial lipopolysaccharide (LPS), other "bacterial products, TLR4-activated platelets, or complement proteins in tandem with TLR2 ligands." Vital NETosis is made possible through the blebbing of the nucleus, resulting in a DNA-filled vesicle that is exocytosed and leaves the plasma membrane intact. Its rapid formation and release does not result in neutrophil death. It has been noted that neutrophils can continue to phagocytose and kill microbes after vital NETosis, highlighting the neutrophil's anti-microbial versatility.

=== Regulation ===
The formation of NETs is regulated by the lipoxygenase pathway – during certain forms of activation (including contact with bacteria) neutrophil 5-lipoxygenase forms 5-HETE-phospholipids that inhibit NET formation. Evidence from laboratory experiments suggests that NETs are cleaned away by macrophages that phagocytose and degrade them.

== NET-associated host damage ==
NETs might also have a deleterious effect on the host, because the extracellular exposure of histone complexes could play a role during the development of autoimmune diseases like systemic lupus erythematosus (SLE). NETs could also play a role in inflammatory diseases, as NETs could be identified in preeclampsia, a pregnancy-related inflammatory disorder in which neutrophils are known to be activated. NETs have also been reported in the colon mucosa of patients with the inflammatory bowel disease ulcerative colitis. NETs have also been associated with the production of IgG antinuclear double stranded DNA antibodies in children infected with P. falciparum malaria.

NETs have also been found in cancer patients. Significantly higher levels of NETs have been detected in cancer patients compared to healthy controls, and have been associated with poor prognosis and clinical outcome. Preclinical research suggests that NETs are jointly responsible for cancer-related pathologies like thrombosis, organ failure and metastasis formation. NETs can cause peripheral organ failure or organ dysfunction in cancer patients by obstructing vasculature, causing an inflammatory response, and by releasing cytotoxic components with a direct damaging effect on the tissue.

NETs have been described as potential promoters of metastasis in cancer. They may enhance metastatic spread through various mechanisms. This influence of NETs creates a challenging environment for diabetic patients, where the combination of immune dysfunction due to hyperglycemia and the pro-metastatic environment created by NETs increases their risk for cancer progression. In breast cancer, NETs have been shown to promote inflammation that facilitates tumor progression and prepares distant organs for metastatic spread. Research has shown that NETs can form in response to infections and surgical stress, which may contribute to metastasis. For instance, A study utilizing the cecal ligation and puncture (CLP) model demonstrated that CLP-induced NETs enhanced the trapping of circulating tumor cells and increased metastasis to the liver. Specifically, when Lewis lung carcinoma cells (LLC-H59) were injected via the intrasplenic route 24 hours after CLP, the mice exhibited a higher number of metastases compared to sham-operated controls. Intravital imaging revealed that NETs colocalized with tumor cells in the liver and lung microvasculature, promoting tumor cell arrest in these areas. NETs can also be induced by cancer cells in the absence of infection or surgical intervention. In a mouse model of breast cancer, it was found that metastatic cancer cells were more effective at inducing NET formation compared to less aggressive cells. Additionally, higher levels of NETs were detected in metastatic lesions of breast cancer patients, particularly in those with triple-negative breast cancer, which is known for its aggressive progression.

NETs have been shown to contribute to the pathogenesis of HIV/SIV. NETs are capable of capturing HIV virions and destroying them. There is an increase in NET production throughout the course of HIV/SIV, which is reduced by ART. In addition, NETs are able to capture and kill various immune cell groups such as CD4+ and CD8+ T cells, B cells, and monocytes. This effect is seen not only with neutrophils in the blood, but also in various tissues such as the gut, lung, liver, and blood vessels. NETs possibly contribute to the hypercoagulable state in HIV by trapping platelets, and expressing tissue factor.

NETs also have a role in thrombosis and have been associated with stroke.

These observations suggest that NETs might play an important role in the pathogenesis of infectious, inflammatory and thrombotic disorders.

Due to the charged and 'sticky' nature of NETs, they may become a problem in cystic fibrosis sufferers, by increasing sputum viscosity. Treatments have focused on breaking down DNA within sputum, which is largely composed of host NET DNA.

A small study published in the journal JAMA Cardiology suggested that NETs played a major role in COVID-19 patients who developed ST-elevation myocardial infarctions.

== NETs and sepsis ==
In recent years, studies have reported an association between NETs and sepsis severity. Several NET-associated biomarkers, including circulating cell-free DNA, histones, myeloperoxidase-DNA complexes, and neutrophil elastase–DNA complexes, have been correlated with disease severity and prognosis. Experimental studies have also suggested that inhibition of NET formation through peptidylarginine deiminase 4 inhibitors or degradation of NETs using deoxyribonuclease I may reduce NET-associated cytotoxicity and improve outcomes in sepsis. However, the development of NET-targeted therapies remains complex, as NETs are thought to exert both protective antimicrobial effects and potentially harmful proinflammatory and prothrombotic effects during sepsis.
