= Neutrophil elastase =

Protein-coding gene in the species Homo sapiens

ELANE
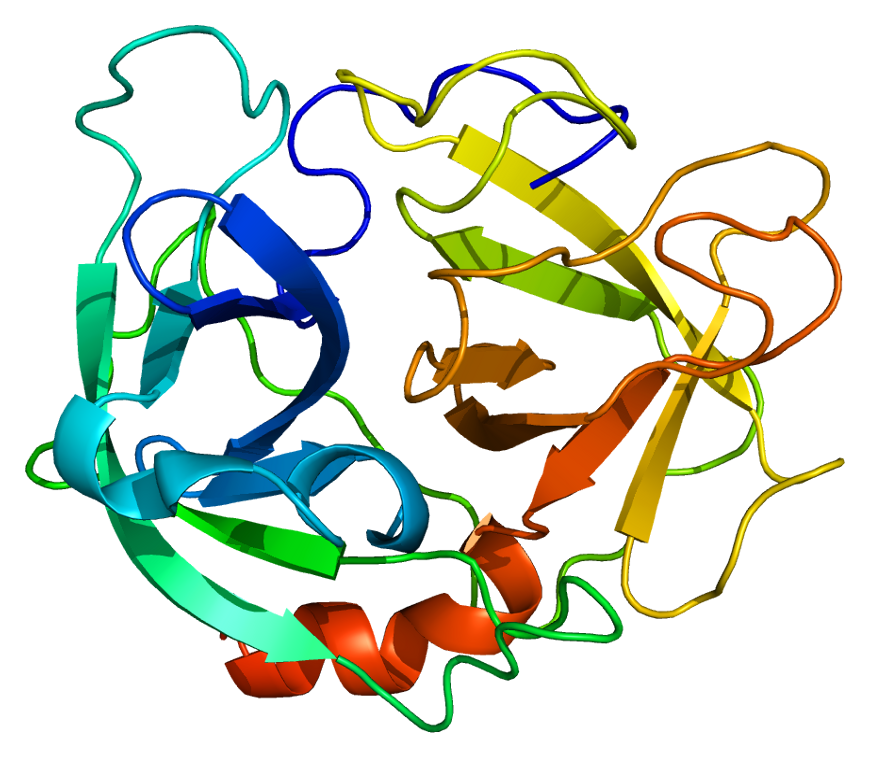

Identifiers
- Aliases: ELANE, ELA2, GE, HLE, HNE, NE, PMN-E, SCN1, elastase, neutrophil expressed
- External IDs: OMIM: 130130; MGI: 2679229; GeneCards: ELANE
Available structures
PDB	Ortholog search: PDBe RCSB
PDB	List of PDB id codes 1B0F, 1H1B, 1HNE, 1PPF, 1PPG, 2RG3, 2Z7F, 3Q76, 3Q77, 4NZL, 4WVP, 5A09, 5A0A, 5A0B, 5A0C, 5ABW
Enzyme activity
EC #	BRENDA	ExPASy	KEGG	MetaCyc
3.4.21.37	↗	↗	↗	↗

Gene location (Human)
Chr.	Chromosome 19 (human)
Band	19p13.3	Start	851,014 bp
Band	19p13.3	End	856,247 bp

Gene location (Mouse)
Chr.	Chromosome 10 (mouse)
Band	10 C1|10 39.72 cM	Start	79,722,081 bp
Band	10 C1|10 39.72 cM	End	79,724,049 bp
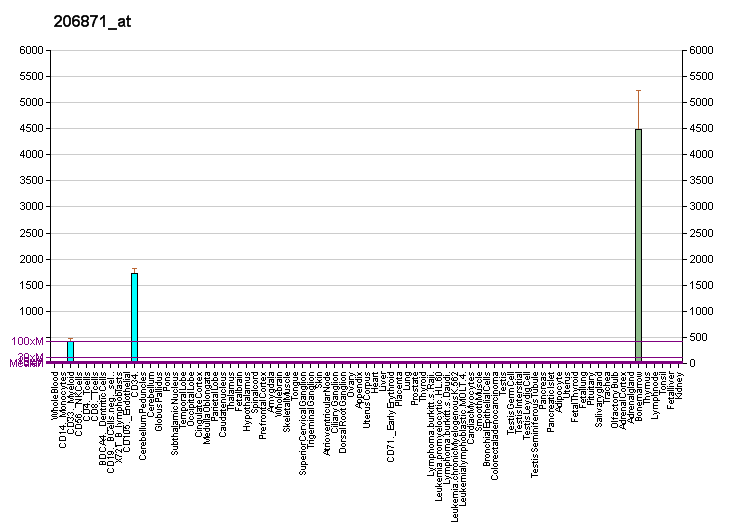
RNA expression pattern
Bgee	Human / Mouse (ortholog); Top expressed in: bone marrow; bone marrow cell; monocyte; blood; spleen; granulocyte; right lung; apex of heart; gastric mucosa; upper lobe of left lung / Top expressed in: tibiofemoral joint; granulocyte; fetal liver hematopoietic progenitor cell; body of femur; bone marrow; ankle joint; Ileal epithelium; spleen; ankle; olfactory epithelium; More reference expression data
BioGPS	More reference expression data
Gene ontology
Molecular function	transcription corepressor activity; heparin binding; endopeptidase activity; protease binding; peptidase activity; protein binding; serine-type peptidase activity; hydrolase activity; cytokine binding; serine-type endopeptidase activity
Cellular component	cytoplasm; transcription repressor complex; secretory granule; extracellular region; cell surface; extracellular exosome; extracellular space; azurophil granule lumen; specific granule lumen; collagen-containing extracellular matrix
Biological process	response to yeast; positive regulation of MAP kinase activity; negative regulation of chemotaxis; cellular calcium ion homeostasis; extracellular matrix disassembly; acute inflammatory response to antigenic stimulus; negative regulation of transcription by RNA polymerase II; defense response to fungus; proteolysis; response to lipopolysaccharide; positive regulation of immune response; protein catabolic process; defense response to bacterium; phagocytosis; neutrophil-mediated killing of fungus; negative regulation of inflammatory response; response to UV; leukocyte migration; positive regulation of smooth muscle cell proliferation; leukocyte migration involved in inflammatory response; positive regulation of leukocyte tethering or rolling; antimicrobial humoral response; neutrophil degranulation
Sources:Amigo / QuickGO
Orthologs
Databases	NCBI: entry; OMA: entry
Species	Human	Mouse
Entrez	1991	50701
Ensembl	ENSG00000277571; ENSG00000197561	ENSMUSG00000020125
UniProt	P08246	Q3UP87
RefSeq (mRNA)	NM_001972	NM_015779
RefSeq (protein)	NP_001963	NP_056594
Location (UCSC)	Chr 19: 0.85 – 0.86 Mb	Chr 10: 79.72 – 79.72 Mb
PubMed search
- Wikidata
View/Edit Human	View/Edit Mouse

Neutrophil elastase (EC 3.4.21.37, leukocyte elastase, ELANE, ELA2, elastase 2, neutrophil, elaszym, serine elastase, subtype human leukocyte elastase (HLE)) is a serine proteinase in the same family as chymotrypsin and has broad substrate specificity. Neutrophil elastase is secreted by neutrophils during inflammation, and destroys bacteria and host tissue. It also localizes to neutrophil extracellular traps (NETs), via its high affinity for DNA, an unusual property for serine proteases.

As with other serine proteinases it contains a charge relay system composed of the catalytic triad of histidine, aspartate, and serine residues that are dispersed throughout the primary sequence of the polypeptide but that are brought together in the three dimensional conformation of the folded protein. The gene encoding neutrophil elastase, ELANE, consists of five exons. Neutrophil elastase is closely related to other cytotoxic immune serine proteases, such as the granzymes and cathepsin G. It is more distantly related to the pancreatic digestive enzymes CELA2A, CELA2B, CELA3A, and CELA3B.

The neutrophil form of elastase (EC 3.4.21.37) is 218 amino acids long, with two asparagine-linked carbohydrate chains (see glycosylation). It is present in azurophil granules in the neutrophil cytoplasm.

== Gene ==
In humans, neutrophil elastase is encoded by the ELANE gene, which resides on chromosome 11.

== Function ==
Elastases form a subfamily of serine proteases that hydrolyze many proteins in addition to elastin. Neutrophil elastase hydrolyzes proteins within specialized neutrophil lysosomes, called azurophil granules, as well as proteins of the extracellular matrix following the protein's release from activated neutrophils. Neutrophil elastase may play a role in degenerative and inflammatory diseases by its proteolysis of collagen-IV and elastin of the extracellular matrix. This protein degrades the outer membrane protein A (OmpA) of E. coli as well as the virulence factors of such bacteria as Shigella, Salmonella and Yersinia. Mutations in this gene are associated with cyclic neutropenia (CyN) and severe congenital neutropenia (SCN). At least 95 disease-causing mutations in this gene have been discovered. This gene is clustered with other serine protease gene family members, azurocidin 1 and proteinase 3 genes, at chromosome 19pter. All 3 genes are expressed coordinately and their protein products are packaged together into azurophil granules during neutrophil differentiation.

== Clinical significance ==
Neutrophil elastase is an important protease enzyme that when expressed aberrantly can cause emphysema or emphysematous changes. This involves breakdown of the lung structure and increased airspaces. Mutations of the ELANE gene cause cyclic and severe congenital neutropenia, which is a failure of neutrophils to mature. In 2019, a study confirmed that ELANE deletion does not cause neutropenia.

== Inhibitors ==
In order to minimize damage to tissues, there are few inhibitors of neutrophil elastase. One group of inhibitors are the Serpins (Serine Protease Inhibitors). Neutrophil elastase has been shown to interact with Alpha 2-antiplasmin, which belongs to the Serpin family of proteins.

== See also ==
- Elastase
