= Autoimmune neutropenia =

Disorder common in infants and young children

- Other names: Autoimmune neutropenia of infancy and primary autoimmune neutropenia
- Pronunciation: au-toim-mune neu-trope-nia
- Specialty: Hematology
- Symptoms: Weak immune system, mouth ulcers, sore throat, lethargy, high fever and chills
- Usual onset: Present from birth
- Duration: Disappears or weakens by age three
- Causes: Autoimmune abnormality
- Diagnostic method: Blood tests
- Treatment: Granulocyte colony-stimulating factors (G-CSF)
- Medication: Corticosteroids and antibiotics
- Prognosis: Disappears or weakens by age three
- Frequency: In the U.s: 1 per 100,000 newborns
- Deaths: None recorded

Autoimmune neutropenia (AIN) is a form of neutropenia which is most common in infants and young children where the body identifies the neutrophils as enemies and makes antibodies to destroy them.

Primary autoimmune neutropenia, another name for autoimmune neutropenia, is an autoimmune disease first reported in 1975 that primarily occurs in infancy. In autoimmune neutropenia, the immune system produces autoantibodies directed against the neutrophilic protein antigens in white blood cells known as granulocytic neutrophils, granulocytes, segmented neutrophils, segs, polysegmented neutrophils, or polys. These antibodies, IgG antibodies, destroy granulocytic neutrophils. Consequently, patients with autoimmune neutropenia have low levels of granulocytic neutrophilic white blood cells causing a condition of neutropenia. Neutropenia causes an increased risk of infection from organisms that the body could normally fight easily.

Primary autoimmune neutropenia has been reported as early as the second month of life although most cases are diagnosed in children between 5 and 15 months of age. Girls have a slightly higher risk of developing AIN than boys as well as do people of Caucasian background. In neutropenia discovered at birth or shortly after birth, a diagnosis of allo-immune neutropenia (from maternal white blood cell antibodies passively transferred to the infant) is more likely.

In infants neutropenia is defined by absolute neutrophil counts less than 1000/uL. After the first year of life neutropenia is defined by absolute counts less than 1500/uL. Neutropenia may be primary in which it is the only blood abnormality seen. In secondary neutropenia, other primary conditions occur, including other autoimmune diseases, infections, and cancers. Neutropenia is considered chronic when it persists for more than 6 months.

== Signs and symptoms ==
Neutropenia, which may be discovered on routine blood tests, typically causes benign infections even when the condition is severe. Ear infections (otitis media) are the most common infection seen in autoimmune neutropenia and typically infection responds to antibiotic treatment alone. Infections associated with primary AIN are usually mild and limited, including skin infections such as impetigo, gastroenteritis, upper respiratory tract infections, and ear infections. Rarely, cellulitis and abscesses may occur. Studies of children studied for up to six years showed that most cases of autoimmune neutropenia resolved spontaneously after a median of 17 months. In 95 percent of patients, neutropenia persisted for 7 to 24 months.

== Diagnosis ==
The diagnosis of autoimmune neutropenia is based on blood tests demonstrating neutropenia and the presence of granulocyte-specific antibodies. In some cases, tests for granulocyte-specific antibodies must be repeated several times before a positive result is seen. Bone marrow aspiration, if performed, is typically normal or it can show increased cell production with a variably diminished number of segmented granulocytes.

An association with prior parvovirus B19 has been made, but this hasn’t been confirmed.

== Treatment ==
Treatment consists of corticosteroids to reduce autoantibody production and antibiotics to prevent infection.

Granulocyte colony-stimulating factor (G-CSF) is recommended to temporarily increase neutrophil counts in patients with absolute neutrophil counts (ANC) of less than 0.5 billion/L and recurrent fever or infections.

In cases of severe infection or the need for surgery, intravenous immunoglobulin therapy may be used.

== Prognosis ==
This form of neutropenia disappears in two to three years of a child's life in 95% of cases.

The use of prophylactic antibiotics has been successfully demonstrated to reduce infection incidence without causing adverse effects among the 5% of children whose condition does not resolve itself.
