= Morning pseudoneutropenia =

Morning pseudoneutropenia is a transient reduction in the measured neutrophil count from peripheral samples. This is noticed in some patients who are taking antipsychotic medication. Morning pseudoneutropenia is thought to be due to diurnal variation in the amount of circulating white blood cells and changes in the levels of hematopoietic cytokines and granulocyte colony stimulating factor (GCSF). Antipsychotics may amplify the natural variation in these hematopoietic factors.

Neutropenia is a hematological disorder characterized by an abnormally low number of neutrophils in the blood. Neutrophils usually make up 50-70% of circulating white blood cells and serve as the primary defense against infections. There is some variability in the neutrophil counts depending upon when the sample is taken, where the blood sample is taken from, and the system used by the medical lab for measuring the blood cells, but any significant reduction in function or number below the appropriate range may predispose individuals to infections.

Case reports of such incidents are reported with clozapine, risperidone, and aripiprazole.

These case reports suggest that the observed cases of the morning pseudoneutropenia did not proceed to become agranulocytosis which is a significant and dangerous side effect of some of antipsychotics. Hence it was suggested that although the morning neutrophil count may appear low, if the antipsychotic medication were considered efficacious then white cell counts may be repeated in the afternoon prior to making a decision based only on the morning counts.
