= HEMGN =

Protein-coding gene in the species Homo sapiens

Identifiers
- Aliases: HEMGN, CT155, EDAG, EDAG-1, NDR, hemogen
- External IDs: OMIM: 610715; MGI: 2136910; HomoloGene: 14223; GeneCards: HEMGN; OMA:HEMGN - orthologs

Gene location (Human)
Chr.	Chromosome 9 (human)
Band	9q22.33	Start	97,926,791 bp
Band	9q22.33	End	97,944,856 bp

Gene location (Mouse)
Chr.	Chromosome 4 (mouse)
Band	4|4 B1	Start	46,393,989 bp
Band	4|4 B1	End	46,413,506 bp
RNA expression pattern
Bgee	Human / Mouse (ortholog); Top expressed in: trabecular bone; sperm; bone marrow; bone marrow cell; monocyte; right testis; left testis; blood; testicle; ganglionic eminence / Top expressed in: fetal liver hematopoietic progenitor cell; tibiofemoral joint; human fetus; body of femur; spleen; right lobe of liver; blood; bone marrow; tail of embryo; yolk sac; More reference expression data
BioGPS	n/a
Gene ontology
Molecular function	protein binding
Cellular component	nucleus; nucleoplasm
Biological process	multicellular organism development; cell differentiation; regulation of osteoblast differentiation
Sources:Amigo / QuickGO
Orthologs
Species	Human	Mouse
Entrez	55363	93966
Ensembl	ENSG00000136929	ENSMUSG00000028332
UniProt	Q9BXL5	Q9ERZ0
RefSeq (mRNA)	NM_018437; NM_197978	NM_053149
RefSeq (protein)	NP_060907; NP_932095	NP_444379
Location (UCSC)	Chr 9: 97.93 – 97.94 Mb	Chr 4: 46.39 – 46.41 Mb
PubMed search
- Wikidata
View/Edit Human	View/Edit Mouse

Hemogen is a protein that in humans is encoded by the HEMGN gene. It plays a crucial role in erythropoiesis, the process of red blood cell formation, by acting as a nuclear transcriptional regulator. Hemogen modulates gene expression involved in the proliferation, differentiation, and survival of erythroid progenitor cells, thereby contributing to the maintenance of normal red blood cell counts and responding to erythropoietic stress.

== Function ==
Hemogen functions primarily as a nuclear transcriptional regulator that actively promotes erythroid differentiation and maturation by modulating chromatin structure and gene expression during erythropoiesis. It recruits the SWI/SNF chromatin-remodeling ATPase BRG1 as a coactivator to enhance nucleosome accessibility and enrich histone H3K27 acetylation at promoters and enhancers of erythroid genes, facilitating their activation. Hemogen also antagonizes the binding of corepressors such as the NuRD complex, promoting an open chromatin state and enabling LDB1 complex-mediated chromatin looping critical for erythroid gene transcription. Loss of Hemogen impairs the production of mature erythroblasts by reducing the expression of genes involved in heme and hemoglobin synthesis, underscoring its essential role in erythroid maturation and hemoglobin production. Proteomic studies further suggest Hemogen interacts with transcription regulators, chromatin modifiers, and histones, possibly acting as a tissue-specific histone chaperone to regulate transcription during erythroid differentiation.

== Mechanism of action ==
Hemgn, a gene with anti-apoptotic properties, is a key downstream target of GFI1 (growth factor independence 1), a transcriptional repressor involved in hematopoiesis. GFI1 plays a crucial role in protecting hematopoietic cells from stress-induced apoptosis. The Hemgn gene is regulated by GFI1 through a 16-bp promoter region located between +47 and +63 bp relative to the transcription start site (TSS). This regulation is dependent on GFI1's interaction with the histone demethylase LSD1. GFI1 activates Hemgn expression through promoter binding, and this activation is enhanced by LSD1-mediated epigenetic modifications that promote transcription of Hemgn.

Hemgn expression is further increased through the synergistic action of Ikaros, another transcription factor. Although Ikaros enhances Hemgn expression, it is not strictly required for GFI1-mediated upregulation. Together, GFI1 and Ikaros cooperate to maximize transcriptional activation of Hemgn.

Hemgn is negatively regulated by PU.1, a transcription factor that functions as a repressor of its expression. GFI1 represses PU.1 expression, leading to derepression and subsequent upregulation of Hemgn. In the absence of PU.1, such as in knockdown or deficiency models, Hemgn expression is enhanced, demonstrating that GFI1 promotes Hemgn expression indirectly by inhibiting PU.1.

Hemgn upregulation contributes significantly to the anti-apoptotic function of GFI1, enabling hematopoietic cells to survive under stress conditions. This protective effect is independent of the p53 pathway and instead relies specifically on Hemgn-mediated mechanisms.
