= Febrile neutropenia =

- Specialty: Hematology

Febrile neutropenia is the development of fever, often with other signs of infection, in a patient with neutropenia, an abnormally low number of neutrophil granulocytes (a type of white blood cell) in the blood. It is an oncologic emergency, and is the most common serious complication in patients with hematopoietic cancers or receiving chemotherapy for cancer. The term neutropenic sepsis is also applied, although it tends to be reserved for patients who are less well. In 50% of cases, an infection is detectable; bacteremia (bacteria in the bloodstream) is present in approximately 20% of all patients with this condition.

== Definition ==
Febrile neutropenia or neutropenic fever is a defined as a single oral temperature value of ≥ 38.3 C (101 F) or a temperature ≥ 38 C (100.4 F) for ≥ 1 hour, with an absolute neutrophil count (ANC) < 1500 cell/microliter. In case of severe neutropenia, the ANC is < 500 cell/microliter. In profoundly severe neutropenia, the ANC is < 100 cells/microliter.

== Pathophysiology ==
Febrile neutropenia can develop in any form of neutropenia, but is most generally recognized as a complication of chemotherapy when it is myelosuppressive (suppresses the bone marrow from producing blood cells). Febrile neutropenia is the most common and serious complication in patients with hematopoietic cancers or receiving chemotherapy for cancer. The condition occurs when a neutropenic patient gets infected by a pathogen. Approximately 50% of patients with febrile neutropenia develop an infection, of which 20% with profound neutropenia will develop bacteremia. Gram-positive bacteria are now the most common pathogens causing febrile neutropenia, with many of these infections resulting from long-term central venous catheters.

== Etiology and antimicrobial susceptibility patterns ==
In patients with solid tumors, febrile neutropenia (FN) has a clinically identifiable focus in approximately 65% of episodes. However, microbiological documentation is achieved in only 20–30% of cases, and blood cultures are positive in 10–25%. The most frequent etiology is bacterial, involving both Gram-negative bacilli and Gram-positive cocci, with an approximate ratio of 3:2.

The selective pressures that favor Gram-positive infections in hematologic patients—such as central venous catheters, fluoroquinolone prophylaxis, grade 3–4 mucositis, or viral infections—are generally less intense in patients with solid tumors. Anaerobic or polymicrobial infections are uncommon but may occur in special circumstances, such as abscesses or enteritis.

In recent years, infections caused by resistant strains, particularly extended-spectrum β-lactamase (ESBL)- or carbapenemase-producing bacteria, have increased. The risk of resistant microorganisms depends on previous colonization, invasive procedures, prior antibiotic exposure, recent hospitalization, chronic comorbidities, and local resistance patterns.

According to European surveillance data, resistance rates reported in 2015 for Gram-positive pathogens were 10–25% to macrolides among pneumococci, 25–50% resistance to cloxacillin among Staphylococcus aureus, up to 90% in coagulase-negative staphylococci, and 1–5% vancomycin resistance in Enterococcus faecium.

Invasive fungal infections (IFIs) are uncommon in patients with solid tumors (<8%). Risk factors for IFIs include prior antibiotic exposure, multiple lines of chemotherapy, prolonged corticosteroid use (≥20 mg/day prednisone equivalent for ≥4 weeks), extensive mucositis, central venous catheters, and prolonged neutropenia (>7 days). Candida albicans accounts for the majority of candidemia cases, though infections due to fluconazole-resistant species such as Candida krusei and Candida glabrata have become more frequent. Seasonal respiratory viruses are common in exposed contacts, but reactivation of latent viruses or those typically associated with acute leukemia or hematopoietic stem cell transplantation is rare among patients with solid tumors.

== Initial evaluation and risk stratification ==
The main goals of the initial clinical assessment in febrile neutropenia (FN) are to determine the severity of illness, identify a potential infectious focus, and clarify the epidemiological context (for instance, recent antibiotic use or previous microbiological isolates). A thorough and systematic physical examination should be performed, focusing on likely sites of infection such as central venous catheters (CVC), skin and soft tissues, the perineal area, respiratory tract, oral cavity, pharynx, sinuses, and abdomen, as well as a neurological assessment and fundoscopy in patients with visual symptoms.

Before starting empirical antibiotics, two blood cultures should be obtained (at least one through the CVC if present), along with additional samples according to clinical suspicion (e.g., urine, sputum, mucosal or skin lesions, stool, cerebrospinal fluid, urinary antigens for pneumococcus and/or Legionella spp., or nasopharyngeal swabs for influenza virus during seasonal outbreaks). Laboratory studies should include a complete blood count, liver and renal function tests, lactate, and a chest X-ray in two projections. Procalcitonin (>0.5 ng/mL) is a more sensitive and early marker than C-reactive protein (≥90 mg/dL) for detecting bacteremia and predicting FN complications, although its incremental value beyond clinical criteria remains uncertain.

In patients with pulmonary infiltrates or profound immunosuppression (e.g., corticosteroids, prolonged neutropenia, immunosuppressive drugs), early bronchoscopy with bronchoalveolar lavage may be indicated. A complete microbiologic workup (viruses, fungi, atypical bacteria) is warranted in selected patients with compatible clinical or epidemiologic features. For patients with respiratory symptoms and an inconclusive chest X-ray, or with persistent fever ≥72 hours and risk factors for complications, chest computed tomography (CT) is more sensitive (87%) and has a negative predictive value of 88%, outperforming plain radiography. Abdominal X-rays have low sensitivity and specificity, and abdominal CT should be preferred when an intra-abdominal source (e.g., enterocolitis, typhlitis) is suspected.

Severity should be assessed clinically before applying prognostic scores. Most patients with solid tumors and FN (approximately 3:1) appear clinically stable during the first three hours after diagnosis.

High-risk or potentially unstable patients include those with sepsis (defined as life-threatening organ dysfunction caused by a dysregulated host response to infection, reflected by an increase of ≥2 points in the SOFA score), septic shock, or severe documented infections such as pneumonia, empyema, peritonitis, cellulitis (>4.5 cm), typhlitis, grade 3–4 enteritis, appendicitis, cholecystitis, meningitis, encephalitis, catheter-related infection, endocarditis, or pyelonephritis. In such cases, mortality from sepsis may reach 18.1%, compared with 2.7% among low-risk patients. The infections associated with the highest mortality include pneumonia, bacteremia (especially due to Gram-negative bacilli), and invasive fungal infections. Tumor progression and lung cancer are also associated with poorer prognosis. Additional comorbidities such as mucositis, enteritis, thrombocytopenia, thromboembolic disease, or transfusion requirements further influence clinical decisions.

The following table lists common high-risk clinical features that contraindicate outpatient management of FN:

=== Table 1. High-risk clinical factors that contraindicate outpatient management of febrile neutropenia ===
System or organ	Risk factors
Vascular	Syncope, systolic blood pressure <90 mmHg, hypertensive crisis, arrhythmias, heart failure, clinically relevant bleeding, angina pectoris
Hematologic	Other clinically relevant cytopenias (platelets <50,000/μL, hemoglobin <8 g/dL), thromboembolic disease
Gastrointestinal	Oral intolerance, vomiting, diarrhea, abdominal pain, jaundice, altered liver function tests
Infectious	Sepsis or severe focus (pneumonia, extensive cellulitis, bacteremia, catheter infection, pyelonephritis, meningitis, cholecystitis or other surgical infections), antibiotic allergy, recent antibiotic use
Neurological	Focal neurological symptoms, suspected meningitis, acute confusional state
Pulmonary	Abscesses, pneumothorax, pleural effusion, acute respiratory failure, pulmonary infiltrates or cavitated nodules
Other	Acute renal failure, dehydration, delirium, electrolyte imbalance, other severe complications, pregnancy, fractures

Even apparently stable patients without the above criteria still have some residual risk. Immunosuppression blunts inflammatory responses, masking early signs of infection; moreover, most patients present soon after fever onset, before complications fully develop. In contemporary series, the rate of unexpected severe complications among apparently stable individuals during the first three hours was 7.3–18.6%.

== MASCC and CISNE risk indexes ==
The Multinational Association for Supportive Care in Cancer (MASCC) risk index is a scoring system designed to identify patients with febrile neutropenia (FN) who are at low risk of serious complications, including death, intensive care unit admission, confusion, cardiac complications, respiratory failure, kidney failure, low blood pressure, bleeding, and other major medical events. A MASCC score of 21 points or higher indicates a lower probability of developing severe complications and can help identify patients who may be candidates for early discharge or outpatient management.

The predictive accuracy of the MASCC index has been questioned in patients with solid tumors who appear clinically stable. Its main variable, hypotension, also defines the outcome it seeks to predict, which creates a circular relationship. Other components, such as “solid tumor” or “outpatient status,” add little discrimination because they are almost universal in this population.

In a cohort of 230 emergency department visits for chemotherapy-induced febrile neutropenia, the Clinical Index of Stable Febrile Neutropenia (CISNE) and MASCC scores were compared. CISNE classified 53 patients (23%) as low risk. Among those labeled low risk by CISNE, 98.1% (95% CI 88.6–99.9%) had no serious complications (positive predictive value for absence of serious complications). By comparison, among those labeled low risk by MASCC, 84.0% had no serious complications (positive predictive value for absence of serious complications), identifying a less precise low-risk cohort in this setting.

A prospective study of 712 low-risk outpatients with solid tumors showed no meaningful advantage of the MASCC score over standard clinical evaluation. Treatment success occurred in 80% of outpatients and 79% of inpatients. Using the MASCC threshold (≥21), the score would have identified only three of the 121 outpatients who later required hospitalization, while unnecessarily hospitalizing nine others who were safely managed as outpatients.

A systematic review and meta-analysis of 26 studies (n=6,617) assessed the accuracy of both tools for predicting serious complications. Using a predictive-value framework (which depends on event prevalence), at an assumed 20% prevalence the estimated negative predictive values (NPV) for ruling out serious complications were ~96.4% for CISNE = 0, ~92.5% for CISNE < 3, and ~84.2% for MASCC ≥ 21. The CISNE score, especially at lower thresholds, was therefore more effective at identifying patients who were not at risk of complications, offering greater reassurance for safe early discharge.

=== CISNE risk index ===
The Clinical Index of Stable Febrile Neutropenia (CISNE) score was developed and validated in Western populations to predict severe complications—such as shock, acute organ failure, arrhythmia, major bleeding, delirium, disseminated intravascular coagulation, or acute abdomen—among patients with solid tumors treated with mild-to-moderate-intensity chemotherapy who appear clinically stable at presentation. CISNE should be applied only after confirming hemodynamic stability and absence of major risk factors. It is not suitable for patients with hematologic malignancies, lymphomas, unstable conditions, or other contraindications to outpatient management.

In its original validation, the complication rate was 1.1% for low-risk, 6.2% for intermediate-risk, and 36.0% for high-risk patients. The primary aim of CISNE is to help prevent unexpected complications after early hospital discharge, not to identify low-risk patients for direct outpatient therapy.

=== Table. CISNE score, nomogram, and calculator ===
Characteristic	Points
ECOG performance status ≥ 2	2
Stress-induced hyperglycemia	2
Chronic obstructive pulmonary disease	1
Chronic cardiovascular disease	1
Mucositis grade ≥ 2	1
Monocytes <200/μL	1

CISNE prognostic category	Score range
Low risk	0
Intermediate risk	1–2
High risk	3–8

== Treatment ==
Generally, patients with febrile neutropenia are treated with empirical antibiotics until the neutrophil count has recovered (absolute neutrophil counts greater than 500/mm^{3}) and the fever has abated; if the neutrophil count does not improve, treatment may need to continue for two weeks or occasionally more. In cases of recurrent or persistent fever, an antifungal agent should be added.

Guidelines issued in 2002 by the Infectious Diseases Society of America recommend the use of particular combinations of antibiotics in specific settings; mild low-risk cases may be treated with a combination of oral amoxicillin-clavulanic acid and ciprofloxacin, while more severe cases require cephalosporins with activity against Pseudomonas aeruginosa (e.g. cefepime), or carbapenems (imipenem or meropenem). A subsequent meta-analysis published in 2006 found cefepime to be associated with more negative outcomes, and carbapenems (while causing a higher rate of pseudomembranous colitis) were the most straightforward in use.

In 2010, updated guidelines were issued by the Infectious Diseases Society of America, recommending use of cefepime, carbapenems (meropenem and imipenem/cilastatin), or piperacillin/tazobactam for high-risk patients and amoxicillin-clavulanic acid and ciprofloxacin for low-risk patients. Patients who do not strictly fulfill the criteria of low-risk patients should be admitted to the hospital and treated as high-risk patients.

Research to compare antibiotic treatments currently recommended in consensus guidelines identified 44 studies comparing different antibiotics. Significantly higher mortality was reported for cefepime compared to all other antibiotics combined. Piperacillin/tazobactam resulted in lower mortality than other antibiotics. Piperacillin/tazobactam might be the preferred antibiotic for the treatment of cancer patients with fever and neutropenia, while cefepime should not be used.

Empiric treatment should be started within 60 minutes of being admitted. Periodic monitoring should be done to see if the empiric treatment is working, or if a more target therapy should be initiated.

In people with cancer who have febrile neutropenia (excluding patients with acute leukaemia), oral treatment is an acceptable alternative to intravenous antibiotic treatment if they are hemodynamically stable, without organ failure, without pneumonia and with no infection of a central line or severe soft-tissue infection. Furthermore, outpatient treatment for low‐risk febrile neutropenia in people with cancer probably makes little or no difference to treatment failure and mortality compared with the standard hospital (inpatient) treatment and may reduce time that patients need to be treated in hospital.

== See also ==
- Leukocytopenia
- Myelosuppression
