= Michael Mackey =

Canadian-American scientist

Michael C. Mackey FRSC
- Born: November 16, 1942 (age 83); Kansas City, Kansas, United States
- Education: University of Kansas; University of Washington
- Occupations: Professor, researcher
- Awards: Forschungspreis, Alexander von Humboldt Stiftung (1987)
- Scientific career
- Workplaces: National Institutes of Health; McGill University
- Doctoral advisor: J. Walter Woodbury

Michael C. Mackey FRSC is a Canadian biophysicist and applied mathematician whose research combines mathematics, physics, and physiology. He is Professor Emeritus in the Department of Physiology at McGill University, where he has also held appointments in physics and mathematics. His research focuses on nonlinear dynamics, mathematical biology, biophysics, physiological systems, stochastic processes, and delay differential equations. He is particularly known for mathematical studies of biological oscillations, chaos, dynamical diseases, hematopoiesis, and gene-regulatory systems.

== Biography ==
He received a Bachelor of Arts (BA, 1963) in Mathematics from the University of Kansas and completed a Doctor of Philosophy (Ph.D., 1968) in Physiology and Biophysics at the University of Washington.

== Career ==
Mackey joined McGill University in 1971 as an assistant professor of physiology. He became an associate professor in 1975 and a professor in 1982. From 2001 to 2015 he held the Joseph Morley Drake Professorship, and in 2015 he became Morley Drake Professor Emeritus, a position he continues to hold.

He directed the Centre for Nonlinear Dynamics in Physiology and Medicine at McGill from 1988 to 2009 and subsequently directed the Centre for Applied Mathematics in Bioscience and Medicine from 2009 to 2015. He has held associate appointments in McGill's departments of physics and mathematics and has been a member of the Centre de Recherches Mathématiques since 2007.

Mackey has held numerous visiting appointments internationally. He was a visiting research professor at the Institute of Mathematics of Silesian University in Katowice, Poland, and held visiting professorships at the Institute of Theoretical Physics at the University of Bremen and the Centre for Mathematical Biology at the University of Oxford. He was associated with the University of Bremen for several decades and held visiting appointments at Oxford in 1986, 1994, 2001, and 2008. He also served as resident director of the Huyck Research Station in New York in 1984.

He served as president of the Canadian Society of Theoretical Biology from 1984 to 1988 and the Society for Mathematical Biology from 2009 to 2011.

In 1999, he was elected a fellow of the Royal Society of Canada in the Academy of Science. He is a Fellow of the American Physical Society (2006), Society for Industrial and Applied Mathematics (SIAM, 2009) and the Society for Mathematical Biology (2017). He was awarded a Forschungspreis by the Alexander von Humboldt Foundation at Bremen University in 1993, and a Doctorat honoris causa by the Universite de Lyon in 2010 and the University of Silesia in 2019, and was the Leverhulme Professor of Mathematical Biology at University of Oxford in 2001-2002.

== Research ==
Mackey's research has applied mathematical models to biological and physiological systems, with particular emphasis on nonlinear dynamics, feedback, oscillation, delay, and stochastic behavior.

His early work examined ion transport through biological membranes, resulting in mathematical models of membrane conductance and electrodiffusion and his 1975 book Ion Transport Through Biological Membranes: An Integrated Theoretical Approach.

During the 1970s, Mackey and Leon Glass developed mathematical models of physiological oscillations, instability, and chaos. Their 1977 Science paper, "Oscillation and chaos in physiological control systems," helped establish nonlinear dynamics as a framework for studying biological rhythms. Their subsequent research examined phase locking, noise, irregular oscillations, and the relationship between dynamical instability and pathological physiological states.

Mackey subsequently developed mathematical models of dynamical diseases, describing pathological states that can arise from altered dynamics in physiological control systems. His research in this area examined oscillatory disorders and feedback mechanisms in systems including blood-cell production and neural and cardiac dynamics.

A major part of his research has concerned mathematical models of hematopoiesis. His models addressed periodic hematological disorders, including aplastic anemia, cyclical neutropenia, periodic leukemia and cyclic thrombocytopenia, and investigated how delays in cell maturation and feedback regulation can generate sustained oscillations.

Mackey later extended these methods to gene regulatory dynamics, developing mathematical models of regulatory networks and feedback in systems such as the tryptophan and lactose operons of Escherichia coli. His broader mathematical research has included stochastic dynamics, statistical properties of dynamical systems, entropy, noise, and delayed systems.

== Scholarly works ==
Mackey has authored or co-authored books on biophysics, mathematical dynamics, chaos, stochastic systems, and mathematical biology. His major books include Ion Transport Through Biological Membranes: An Integrated Theoretical Approach (1975), Probabilistic Properties of Deterministic Systems (1985, with Andrzej Lasota), From Clocks to Chaos: The Rhythms of Life (1988, with Leon Glass), Time's Arrow: The Origins of Thermodynamic Behavior (1992), Chaos, Fractals and Noise: Stochastic Aspects of Dynamics (1994, with Lasota), and Simple Mathematical Models of Gene Regulatory Dynamics (2016, with Santillan, Tyran-Kaminska, and Zeron).

== Honors ==
Mackey has received the Humboldt Research Prize on four occasions (1987, 1993, 2007, and 2010), the CAIMS Research Prize (2006), and the Queen Elizabeth II Diamond Jubilee Medal (2012). He was elected a Fellow of the Royal Society of Canada in 1999, a Fellow of the American Physical Society in 2006, a Fellow of the Society for Industrial and Applied Mathematics in 2006, and a Fellow of the Society for Mathematical Biology in 2017. He has also received honorary doctorates from Université Lyon 1 (2010) and Silesian University in Katowice (2019), and served as Leverhulme Professor at the University of Oxford in 2001–2002.
