= Cathepsin G =

Protein-coding gene in the species Homo sapiens

CTSG
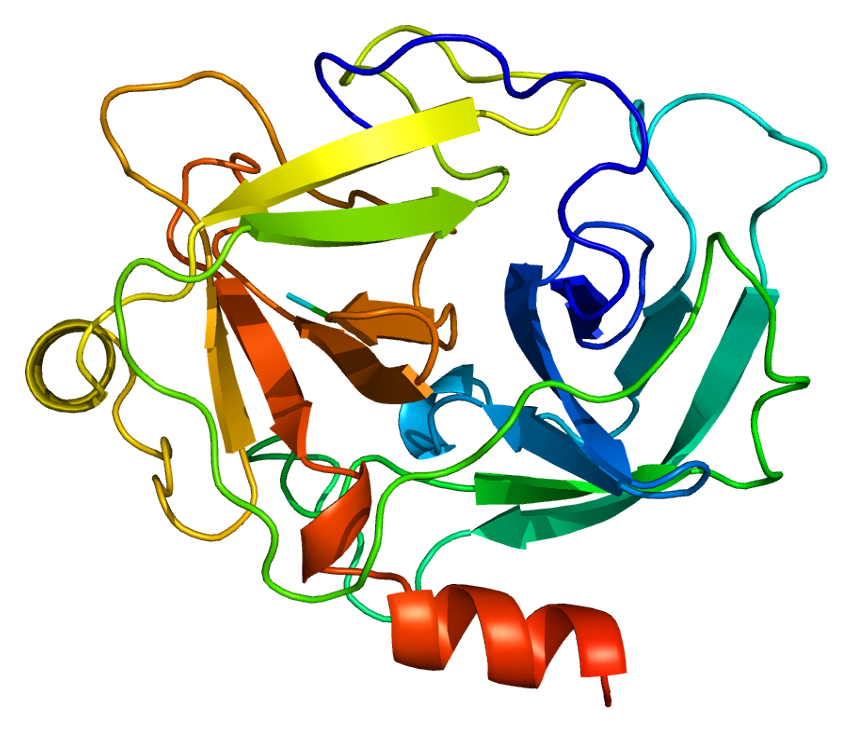

Identifiers
- Aliases: CTSG, CATG, CG, cathepsin G
- External IDs: OMIM: 116830; MGI: 88563; GeneCards: CTSG
Available structures
PDB	Ortholog search: PDBe RCSB
PDB	List of PDB id codes 1AU8, 1CGH, 1KYN, 1T32
Enzyme activity
EC #	BRENDA	ExPASy	KEGG	MetaCyc
3.4.21.20	↗	↗	↗	↗

Gene location (Human)
Chr.	Chromosome 14 (human)
Band	14q12	Start	24,573,518 bp
Band	14q12	End	24,576,250 bp

Gene location (Mouse)
Chr.	Chromosome 14 (mouse)
Band	14 C3|14 28.19 cM	Start	56,337,338 bp
Band	14 C3|14 28.19 cM	End	56,340,031 bp
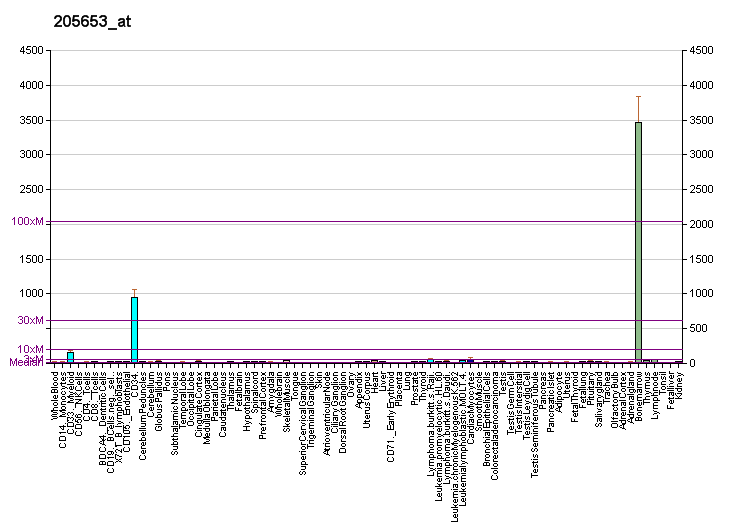
RNA expression pattern
Bgee	Human / Mouse (ortholog); Top expressed in: trabecular bone; bone marrow cell; triceps brachii muscle; gallbladder; skin of hip; testicle; monocyte; skin of leg; skin of abdomen; rectum / Top expressed in: tibiofemoral joint; fetal liver hematopoietic progenitor cell; granulocyte; gastrula; bone marrow; decidua; ankle joint; body of femur; spleen; vestibular membrane of cochlear duct; More reference expression data
BioGPS	More reference expression data
Gene ontology
Molecular function	heparin binding; peptidase activity; protein binding; hydrolase activity; serine-type endopeptidase activity; serine-type peptidase activity
Cellular component	extracellular matrix; plasma membrane; secretory granule; cell surface; extracellular exosome; nucleus; extracellular space; azurophil granule lumen; cytoplasmic stress granule; extracellular region; cytoplasm; collagen-containing extracellular matrix
Biological process	extracellular matrix disassembly; proteolysis; angiotensin maturation; protein phosphorylation; response to lipopolysaccharide; positive regulation of immune response; defense response to bacterium; immune response; defense response to Gram-positive bacterium; antimicrobial humoral response; neutrophil degranulation; defense response to fungus; neutrophil-mediated killing of gram-positive bacterium
Sources:Amigo / QuickGO
Orthologs
Databases	NCBI: entry; OMA: entry
Species	Human	Mouse
Entrez	1511	13035
Ensembl	ENSG00000100448	ENSMUSG00000040314
UniProt	P08311	P28293
RefSeq (mRNA)	NM_001911	NM_007800
RefSeq (protein)	NP_001902	NP_031826
Location (UCSC)	Chr 14: 24.57 – 24.58 Mb	Chr 14: 56.34 – 56.34 Mb
PubMed search
- Wikidata
View/Edit Human	View/Edit Mouse

Cathepsin G is a protein that in humans is encoded by the CTSG gene. It is one of the three serine proteases of the chymotrypsin family that are stored in the azurophil granules, and also a member of the peptidase S1 protein family. Cathepsin G plays an important role in eliminating intracellular pathogens and breaking down tissues at inflammatory sites, as well as in anti-inflammatory response.

== Structure ==
=== Gene ===
The CTSG gene is located at chromosome 14q11.2, consisting of 5 exons. Each residue of the catalytic triad is located on a separate exon. Five polymorphisms have been identified by scanning the entire coding region. Cathepsin G homologs evolved from a common ancestor via gene duplication.

=== Protein ===
Cathepsin G is a 255-amino-acid-residue protein including an 18-residue signal peptide, a two-residue activation peptide at the N-terminus and a carboxy terminal extension. The activity of cathepsin G depends on a catalytic triad composed of aspartate, histidine and serine residues which are widely separated in the primary sequence but close to each other at the active site of the enzyme in the tertiary structure.

== Function ==
Cathepsin G has a specificity similar to that of chymotrypsin C, but it is most closely related to other immune serine proteases, such as neutrophil elastase and the granzymes. As a neutrophil serine protease, was first identified as degradative enzyme that acts intracellularly to degrade ingested host pathogens and extracellularly in the breakdown of ECM components at inflammatory sites. It localizes to Neutrophil extracellular traps (NETs), via its high affinity for DNA, an unusual property for serine proteases. Transcript variants utilizing alternative polyadenylation signals exist for this gene. Cathepsin G was also found to exert broad-spectrum antibacterial action against Gram-negative and –positive bacteria independent of the function mentioned above. Other functions of cathepsin G have been reported, including cleavage of receptors, conversion of angiotensin I to angiotensin II, platelet activation, and induction of airway submucosal gland secretion. Potential implications of the enzyme in blood-brain barrier breakdown was also found.

== Clinical significance ==
Cathepsin G has been reported to play an important role in a variety of diseases, including rheumatoid arthritis, coronary artery disease, periodontitis, ischemic reperfusion injury, and bone metastasis. It is also implicated in a variety of infectious inflammatory diseases, including chronic obstructive pulmonary disease, acute respiratory distress syndrome, and cystic fibrosis. A recent study shows that patients with CTSG gene polymorphisms have higher risk of chronic postsurgical pain, suggesting cathepsin G may serve as a novel target for pain control and a potential marker to predict chronic postsurgical pain. An upregulation of cathepsin G was reported in studies of keratoconus.

== Interactions ==
Cathepsin G has been found to interact with:

- SERPINB1

Cathepsin G is inhibited by:

- [2-[3-[[(1-benzoyl-4-piperidinyl)methylamino]carbonyl]-2-naphthalenyl]-1-(1-naphthalenyl)-2-oxoethyl]-phosphonic acid (KPA)
- Caesalpinia echinata elastase inhibitor
- N-Arylacyl O-sulfonated aminoglycosides

Cathepsin G lowers levels of:

- Low-density lipoprotein

== See also ==
- Cathepsins
