= VPS45 =

Protein-coding gene in humans

Identifiers
- Aliases: VPS45, H1, H1SCN5, VPS45A, VPS45B, VPS54A, VSP45, VSP45A, vacuolar protein sorting 45 homolog
- External IDs: OMIM: 610035; MGI: 891965; GeneCards: VPS45

Gene location (Human)
Chr.	Chromosome 1 (human)
Band	1q21.2	Start	150,067,279 bp
Band	1q21.2	End	150,145,329 bp

Gene location (Mouse)
Chr.	Chromosome 3 (mouse)
Band	3 F2.1|3 41.65 cM	Start	95,907,144 bp
Band	3 F2.1|3 41.65 cM	End	95,965,778 bp
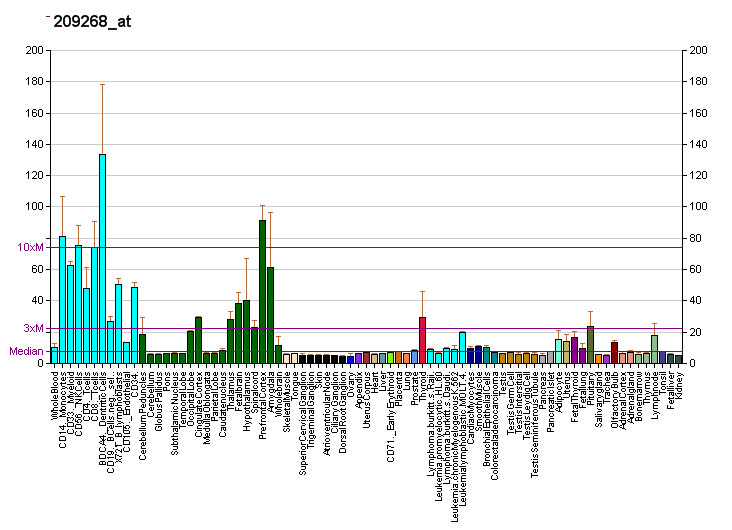
RNA expression pattern
Bgee	Human / Mouse (ortholog); Top expressed in: cerebellar cortex; cerebellar hemisphere; right hemisphere of cerebellum; right adrenal cortex; ganglionic eminence; cerebellar vermis; left adrenal gland; monocyte; left adrenal cortex; Achilles tendon / Top expressed in: neural layer of retina; neural tube; facial motor nucleus; dentate gyrus of hippocampal formation granule cell; right kidney; muscle of thigh; ganglionic eminence; Region I of hippocampus proper; lens; supraoptic nucleus; More reference expression data
BioGPS	More reference expression data
Gene ontology
Molecular function	protein binding; molecular function
Cellular component	integral component of membrane; endosome; Golgi apparatus; endosome membrane; membrane; Golgi membrane; cellular component; synaptic vesicle
Biological process	protein transport; intracellular protein transport; blood coagulation; vesicle-mediated transport; vesicle docking involved in exocytosis
Sources:Amigo / QuickGO
Orthologs
Databases	NCBI: entry; OMA: entry
Species	Human	Mouse
Entrez	11311	22365
Ensembl	ENSG00000136631	ENSMUSG00000015747
UniProt	Q9NRW7	P97390
RefSeq (mRNA)	NM_001279353; NM_001279354; NM_001279355; NM_007259	NM_013841
RefSeq (protein)	NP_001266282; NP_001266283; NP_009190	NP_038869
Location (UCSC)	Chr 1: 150.07 – 150.15 Mb	Chr 3: 95.91 – 95.97 Mb
PubMed search
- Wikidata
View/Edit Human	View/Edit Mouse

Vacuolar protein sorting-associated protein 45 is a protein that in humans is encoded by the VPS45 gene.

== Function ==
Vesicle mediated protein sorting plays an important role in segregation of intracellular molecules into distinct organelles. Genetic studies in yeast have identified more than 40 vacuolar protein sorting (VPS) genes involved in vesicle transport to vacuoles. This gene is a member of the Sec1 domain family, and shows a high degree of sequence similarity to mouse, rat and yeast Vps45. The exact function of this gene is not known, but its high expression in peripheral blood mononuclear cells suggests a role in trafficking proteins, including inflammatory mediators.
