= G6PC2 =

Protein-coding gene in humans

Identifiers
- Aliases: G6PC2, IGRP, glucose-6-phosphatase catalytic subunit 2
- External IDs: OMIM: 608058; MGI: 1277193; GeneCards: G6PC2
Enzyme activity
EC #	BRENDA	ExPASy	KEGG	MetaCyc
3.1.3.9	↗	↗	↗	↗

Gene location (Human)
Chr.	Chromosome 2 (human)
Band	2q31.1	Start	168,901,291 bp
Band	2q31.1	End	168,910,000 bp

Gene location (Mouse)
Chr.	Chromosome 2 (mouse)
Band	2 C2|2 39.66 cM	Start	69,041,417 bp
Band	2 C2|2 39.66 cM	End	69,058,185 bp
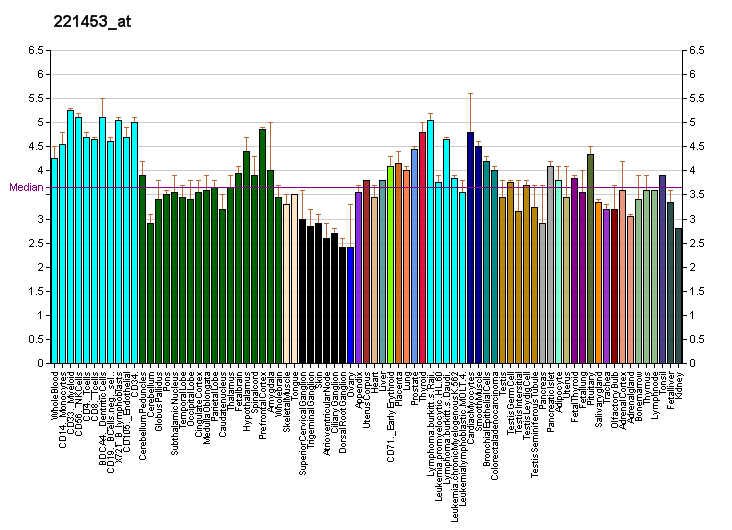
RNA expression pattern
Bgee	Human / Mouse (ortholog); Top expressed in: islet of Langerhans; body of pancreas; duodenum; left testis; right testis; Achilles tendon; white blood cell; myeloid leukocyte; monocyte; liver / Top expressed in: islet of Langerhans; embryo; tail of embryo; vas deferens; right ventricle; renal corpuscle; tracheobronchial tree; trachea; spinal ganglia; prostate; More reference expression data
BioGPS	More reference expression data
Gene ontology
Molecular function	hydrolase activity; glucose-6-phosphatase activity
Cellular component	membrane; integral component of membrane; integral component of endoplasmic reticulum membrane; endoplasmic reticulum membrane; endoplasmic reticulum
Biological process	glucose 6-phosphate metabolic process; glucose homeostasis; regulation of insulin secretion; dephosphorylation; gluconeogenesis
Sources:Amigo / QuickGO
Orthologs
Databases	NCBI: entry; OMA: entry
Species	Human	Mouse
Entrez	57818	14378
Ensembl	ENSG00000278373; ENSG00000152254	ENSMUSG00000005232
UniProt	Q9NQR9	Q9Z186
RefSeq (mRNA)	NM_001081686; NM_021176	NM_001289856; NM_001289857; NM_021331
RefSeq (protein)	NP_001075155; NP_066999	NP_001276785; NP_001276786; NP_067306
Location (UCSC)	Chr 2: 168.9 – 168.91 Mb	Chr 2: 69.04 – 69.06 Mb
PubMed search
- Wikidata
View/Edit Human	View/Edit Mouse

Glucose-6-phosphatase 2 is an enzyme that in humans is encoded by the G6PC2 gene.

== Function ==
This gene encodes an enzyme belonging to the glucose-6-phosphatase catalytic subunit family. These enzymes are part of a multicomponent integral membrane system that catalyzes the hydrolysis of glucose-6-phosphate, the terminal step in gluconeogenic and glycogenolytic pathways, allowing the release of glucose into the bloodstream. The family member encoded by this gene is found in pancreatic islets and does not exhibit phosphohydrolase activity, but it is a major target of cell-mediated autoimmunity in diabetes. Several alternatively spliced transcript variants of this gene have been described, but their biological validity has not been determined.
