= G6PC3 =

Protein-coding gene in the species Homo sapiens

Identifiers
- Aliases: G6PC3, SCN4, UGRP, glucose 6 phosphatase catalytic subunit 3, glucose-6-phosphatase catalytic subunit 3
- External IDs: OMIM: 611045; MGI: 1915651; GeneCards: G6PC3
Enzyme activity
EC #	BRENDA	ExPASy	KEGG	MetaCyc
3.1.3.9	↗	↗	↗	↗

Gene location (Human)
Chr.	Chromosome 17 (human)
Band	17q21.31	Start	44,070,620 bp
Band	17q21.31	End	44,082,151 bp

Gene location (Mouse)
Chr.	Chromosome 11 (mouse)
Band	11|11 D	Start	102,080,446 bp
Band	11|11 D	End	102,084,907 bp
RNA expression pattern
Bgee	Human / Mouse (ortholog); Top expressed in: anterior pituitary; right adrenal gland; right adrenal cortex; left adrenal gland; left adrenal cortex; C1 segment; right lobe of thyroid gland; stromal cell of endometrium; left lobe of thyroid gland; apex of heart / Top expressed in: choroid plexus of fourth ventricle; spermatocyte; muscle of thigh; right kidney; seminiferous tubule; spermatid; yolk sac; entorhinal cortex; primary visual cortex; genital tubercle; More reference expression data
BioGPS	n/a
Gene ontology
Molecular function	hydrolase activity; glucose-6-phosphatase activity
Cellular component	integral component of membrane; integral component of endoplasmic reticulum membrane; endoplasmic reticulum membrane; membrane; endoplasmic reticulum
Biological process	phosphate-containing compound metabolic process; glucose 6-phosphate metabolic process; glucose-6-phosphate transport; dephosphorylation; gluconeogenesis
Sources:Amigo / QuickGO
Orthologs
Databases	NCBI: entry; OMA: entry
Species	Human	Mouse
Entrez	92579	68401
Ensembl	ENSG00000141349	ENSMUSG00000034793
UniProt	Q9BUM1	Q6NSQ9
RefSeq (mRNA)	NM_138387; NM_001319945; NM_001384165; NM_001384166; NM_001384167 NM_001384168	NM_175935
RefSeq (protein)	NP_001306874; NP_612396; NP_001371094; NP_001371095; NP_001371096 NP_001371097	NP_787949
Location (UCSC)	Chr 17: 44.07 – 44.08 Mb	Chr 11: 102.08 – 102.08 Mb
PubMed search
- Wikidata
View/Edit Human	View/Edit Mouse

Glucose-6-phosphatase 3, also known as glucose-6-phosphatase beta, is an enzyme that in humans is encoded by the G6PC3 gene.

== Function ==
This gene encodes the catalytic subunit of glucose 6-phosphatase (G6Pase). G6Pase is located in the endoplasmic reticulum (ER) and catalyzes the hydrolysis of glucose 6-phosphate to glucose and phosphate in the last step of the gluconeogenic and glycogenolytic pathways.

== Clinical significance ==
Mutations in this gene result in autosomal recessive severe congenital neutropenia.

G6PC3 deficiency results in a phenotypic continuum. At one end the affected individuals have only neutropenia and related complications but no other organ is affected. This is sometimes referred to as non-syndromic or isolated severe congenital neutropenia. Most affected individuals have a classic form of the disease with severe congenital neutropenia and cardiovascular and/or urogenital abnormalities. Some individuals have severe G6PC3 deficiency (also known as Dursun syndrome) and they have all the features of classic G6PC3 deficiency but in addition show involvement of non-myeloid hematopoietic cell lines, some other extra-hematologic features and pulmonary hypertension.
