= GFI1 =

Protein-coding gene in humans

Identifiers
- Aliases: GFI1, GFI-1, GFI1A, SCN2, ZNF163, growth factor independent 1 transcriptional repressor
- External IDs: OMIM: 600871; MGI: 103170; GeneCards: GFI1

Gene location (Human)
Chr.	Chromosome 1 (human)
Band	1p22.1	Start	92,473,043 bp
Band	1p22.1	End	92,486,925 bp

Gene location (Mouse)
Chr.	Chromosome 5 (mouse)
Band	5 F|5 52.23 cM	Start	107,864,523 bp
Band	5 F|5 52.23 cM	End	107,873,902 bp
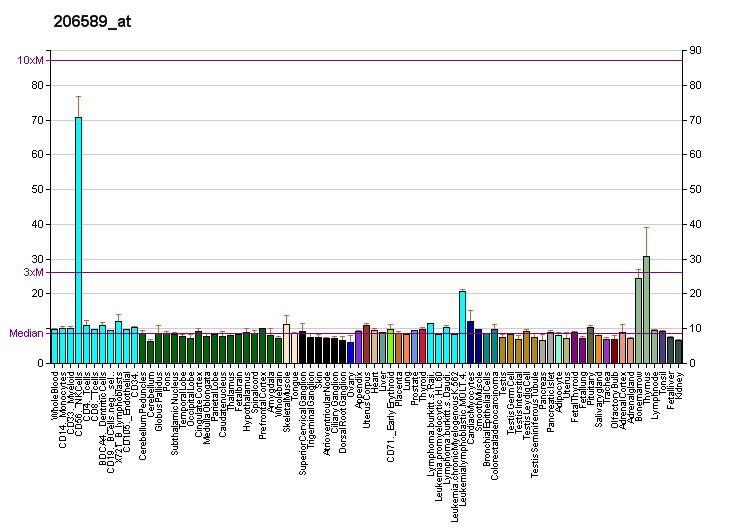
RNA expression pattern
Bgee	Human / Mouse (ortholog); Top expressed in: granulocyte; bone marrow; bone marrow cell; trabecular bone; body of pancreas; testicle; thymus; blood; lymph node; spleen / Top expressed in: utricle; vestibular sensory epithelium; thymus; saccule; granulocyte; spermatocyte; bone marrow; tongue; mesenteric lymph nodes; embryo; More reference expression data
BioGPS	More reference expression data
Gene ontology
Molecular function	DNA binding; metal ion binding; DNA-binding transcription repressor activity, RNA polymerase II-specific; protein binding; nucleic acid binding; DNA-binding transcription factor activity, RNA polymerase II-specific; DNA-binding transcription factor activity
Cellular component	nuclear body; nuclear matrix; transcription repressor complex; nucleus; nucleoplasm
Biological process	positive regulation of interleukin-6-mediated signaling pathway; negative regulation of neuron projection development; regulation of transcription, DNA-templated; regulation of toll-like receptor signaling pathway; regulation of histone H3-K4 methylation; negative regulation of transcription by RNA polymerase II; regulation of transcription involved in G1/S transition of mitotic cell cycle; transcription, DNA-templated; negative regulation of vitamin D biosynthetic process; negative regulation of calcidiol 1-monooxygenase activity; viral process; negative regulation of transcription, DNA-templated; negative regulation of NF-kappaB transcription factor activity; cellular response to lipopolysaccharide; hemopoiesis; positive regulation of transcription by RNA polymerase II
Sources:Amigo / QuickGO
Orthologs
Databases	NCBI: entry; OMA: entry
Species	Human	Mouse
Entrez	2672	14581
Ensembl	ENSG00000162676	ENSMUSG00000029275
UniProt	Q99684	P70338
RefSeq (mRNA)	NM_001127215; NM_001127216; NM_005263	NM_001267621; NM_010278
RefSeq (protein)	NP_001120687; NP_001120688; NP_005254	NP_001254550; NP_034408
Location (UCSC)	Chr 1: 92.47 – 92.49 Mb	Chr 5: 107.86 – 107.87 Mb
PubMed search
- Wikidata
View/Edit Human	View/Edit Mouse

Zinc finger protein Gfi-1 is a transcriptional repressor that in humans is encoded by the GFI1 gene. It is important normal hematopoiesis.

== Function ==
Gfi1 (growth factor independence 1) is a transcriptional repressor that plays a critical role in hematopoiesis and in protecting hematopoietic cells against stress-induced apoptosis. Gfi1 upregulates the expression of the nuclear protein Hemgn, which contributes to its anti-apoptotic activity. This upregulation is mediated through a specific 16-bp promoter region and is dependent on Gfi1’s interaction with the histone demethylase LSD1. Gfi1 represses PU.1 transcription factor, and this repression precedes and correlates with the upregulation of Hemgn. The upregulation of Hemgn, in turn, contributes to the anti-apoptotic function of Gfi1, acting in a p53-independent manner.

Gfi1 promotes cell survival by upregulating Hemgn through the repression of PU.1 thereby inhibiting apoptosis. Gfi1 inhibits apoptosis induced by DNA damage, growth factor withdrawal, inhibitory cytokine TGF-β and MYC activation

Gfi1 is also expressed in the inner ear, and in the epithelium lining the stomach, intestines, and lung airways, where it is important for cellular differentiation.

In lymphoid lineages, GFI1 plays a vital role in directing cell fate decisions, differentiation and functional maintenance. Within CD8^{+} T cells, GFI1-driven transcriptional and epigenetic programs are essential for preserving cellular stemness and long-term persistence. Beyond the T cell lineage, the GFI1–FOXO1 axis functions as a key regulator of natural killer (NK) cell maturation and effector function.

== Interactions ==
GFI1 has been shown to interact with PIAS3 and RUNX1T1.
