= Azurophilic granule =

Cellular object readily stainable with a RomanowskI stain

Details

Identifiers
- Latin: Granulum azurophilum
- TH: H2.00.04.1.02011, H2.00.04.1.02014

An azurophilic granule is a cellular object readily stainable with a Romanowsky stain. In white blood cells and hyperchromatin, staining imparts a burgundy or merlot coloration. Neutrophils in particular are known for containing azurophils loaded with a wide variety of anti-microbial defensins that fuse with phagocytic vacuoles. Azurophils may contain myeloperoxidase, phospholipase A2, acid hydrolases, elastase, defensins, neutral serine proteases, bactericidal permeability-increasing protein, lysozyme, cathepsin G, proteinase 3, and proteoglycans.

Azurophil granules are also known as "primary granules".

Furthermore, the term "azurophils" may refer to a unique type of cells, identified only in reptiles. These cells are similar in size to so-called heterophils with abundant cytoplasm that is finely to coarsely granular and may sometimes contain vacuoles. Granules may impart a purplish hue to the cytoplasm, particularly to the outer region. Occasionally, azurophils are observed with vacuolated cytoplasm.

== See also ==
- Azure A
- Azure (color)
- Granule
- Lysosome
- Specific granules
- Neutrophil degranulation
