= Absolute neutrophil count =

Measure of the number of neutrophils present in blood

Absolute neutrophil count (ANC) is a measure of the number of neutrophil granulocytes (also known as polymorphonuclear cells, PMN's, polys, granulocytes, segmented neutrophils or segs) present in the blood. Neutrophils are a type of white blood cell that fights against infection.

The ANC is almost always a part of a larger blood panel called the complete blood count. The ANC is calculated from measurements of the total number of white blood cells (WBC), usually based on the combined percentage of mature neutrophils (sometimes called "segs", or segmented cells) and bands, which are immature neutrophils.

== Clinical significance ==
The reference range for ANC in adults varies by study, but 1500 to 8000 cells per microliter is typical. An ANC less than 1500 cells/μL is defined as neutropenia and increases risk of infection. Neutropenia is the condition of a low ANC, and the most common condition where an ANC would be measured is in the setting of chemotherapy for cancer.

Neutrophilia indicates an elevated count. While many clinicians refer to the presence of neutrophilia as a "left shift", this is imprecise, as a left shift indicates the presence of immature neutrophil forms, but neutrophilia refers to the entire mass of neutrophils, both mature and immature. Neutrophilia can be indicative of:

- Premature release of myeloid cells from the bone marrow.
- A leukemoid reaction.

== Calculation ==
ANC = $(\%neutrophils + \%bands)\times (WBC)\over (100)$

or

ANC = (Absolute-Polys + Absolute-Bands)

== Ranges ==
Neutropenia Risk Category	ANC
Mild	≥ 1000 to < 1500 cells/μL
Moderate	≥ 500 to < 1000 cells/μL
Severe	< 500 cells/μL

== Related tests ==
In some cases, a ratio is reported in addition to the sum. This is known as the "I/T ratio".
