= Baso =

Baso may refer to:

- Baso (island), Indonesia
- Baso (village), Indonesia
- Baso language
- Baso Dōitsu or Mazu Daoyi
- Baso Sangqu (born 1968), South African politician
- CFU-Baso, a colony forming unit

== See also ==
- Basso (disambiguation)
