= Basso =

Basso may refer to:

- Basso (surname), an Italian surname
- Basso & Brooke, a fashion label formed by Bruno Basso and Christopher Brooke
- Campanile Basso, a mountain in the Brenta group
- San Basso, a Baroque-style deconsecrated Roman Catholic church in central Venice, Italy
- 49501 Basso, a minor planet
- Basso Bikes, an Italian bicycle manufacturer

== Music ==
- Bass (voice type), a type of classical male singing voice and has the lowest vocal range of all voice types
- Basso continuo, parts provided the harmonic structure of the music by supplying a bassline and a chord progression
- Basso profondo, the bass voice subtype with the lowest vocal range

== See also ==
- Baso (disambiguation)
- Bass (disambiguation)
- Bassa (disambiguation)
- Bassi (disambiguation)
