= Hematopoietic stem cell =

Stem cells that give rise to other blood cells

- Overview of normal human haematopoiesis

Details
- Precursor: Hemangioblast
- System: Hematopoietic system
- Location: Bone marrow
- Function: Stem cells that give rise to other blood cells

Identifiers
- Latin: cellula haematopoietica praecursoria
- Acronym: HSC
- MeSH: D006412
- TH: H2.00.01.0.00006

A cell that arises from a progenitor cell during hematopoiesis. Myeloid cells can become granulocytes, monocytes, erythrocytes, or platelets.

Hematopoietic stem cells (HSCs) are the stem cells that give rise to other blood cells. This process is called haematopoiesis. In vertebrates, the first definitive HSCs arise from the ventral endothelial wall of the embryonic aorta within the (midgestational) aorta-gonad-mesonephros region, through a process known as endothelial-to-hematopoietic transition. In adults, haematopoiesis occurs in the red bone marrow, in the core of most bones. The red bone marrow is derived from the layer of the embryo called the mesoderm. Recent study marks the first global discovery of hematopoietic stem cell (HSC) niches within invertebrate skeletons—overturning the long-held belief that skeletal hematopoiesis is unique to vertebrates.

Haematopoiesis is the process by which all mature blood cells are produced. It must balance enormous production needs (the average person produces more than 500 billion blood cells every day) with the need to regulate the number of each blood cell type in the circulation. In vertebrates, the vast majority of hematopoiesis occurs in the bone marrow and is derived from a limited number of hematopoietic stem cells that are multipotent and capable of extensive self-renewal.

Hematopoietic stem cells give rise to different types of blood cells, in lines called myeloid and lymphoid. Myeloid cells include monocytes, macrophages, neutrophils, basophils, eosinophils, erythrocytes, and megakaryocytes to platelets. Lymphoid cells include T cells, B cells, natural killer cells, and innate lymphoid cells. Myeloid and lymphoid lineages both are involved in dendritic cell formation.

The definition of hematopoietic stem cell has developed since they were first discovered in 1961. The hematopoietic tissue contains cells with long-term and short-term regeneration capacities and committed multipotent, oligopotent, and unipotent progenitors. Hematopoietic stem cells constitute 1:10,000 of cells in myeloid tissue.

HSC transplants are used in the treatment of cancers and other immune system disorders due to their regenerative properties.

== Structure ==
They are round, non-adherent, with a rounded nucleus and low cytoplasm-to-nucleus ratio. In shape, hematopoietic stem cells resemble lymphocytes.

=== Location ===
The very first hematopoietic stem cells during (mouse and human) embryonic development are found in aorta-gonad-mesonephros region and the vitelline and umbilical arteries. Slightly later, HSCs are also found in the placenta, yolk sac, embryonic head, and fetal liver.

Stem and progenitor cells can be taken from the pelvis, at the iliac crest, using a needle and syringe. The cells can be removed as liquid (to perform a smear to look at the cell morphology) or they can be removed via a core biopsy (to maintain the architecture or relationship of the cells to each other and to the bone).

=== Subtypes ===
A colony-forming unit is a subtype of HSC. (This sense of the term is different from colony-forming units of microbes, which is a cell counting unit.) There are various kinds of HSC colony-forming units:

- Colony-forming unit–granulocyte-erythrocyte-monocyte-megakaryocyte (CFU-GEMM)
- Colony-forming unit–lymphocyte (CFU-L)
- Colony-forming unit–erythrocyte (CFU-E)
- Colony-forming unit–granulocyte-macrophage (CFU-GM)
- Colony-forming unit–megakaryocyte (CFU-Meg)
- Colony-forming unit–basophil (CFU-Baso)
- Colony-forming unit–eosinophil (CFU-Eos)

The above CFUs are based on the lineage. Another CFU, the colony-forming unit–spleen (CFU-S), was the basis of an in vivo clonal colony formation, which depends on the ability of infused bone marrow cells to give rise to clones of maturing hematopoietic cells in the spleens of irradiated mice after 8 to 12 days. It was used extensively in early studies, but is now considered to measure more mature progenitor or transit-amplifying cells rather than stem cells.

=== Isolating stem cells ===
Since hematopoietic stem cells cannot be isolated as a pure population, it is not possible to identify them in a microscope. Hematopoietic stem cells can be identified or isolated by the use of flow cytometry where the combination of several different cell surface markers (particularly CD34) are used to separate the rare hematopoietic stem cells from the surrounding blood cells. Hematopoietic stem cells lack expression of mature blood cell markers and are thus called Lin-. Lack of expression of lineage markers is used in combination with detection of several positive cell-surface markers to isolate hematopoietic stem cells. In addition, hematopoietic stem cells are characterised by their small size and low staining with vital dyes such as rhodamine 123 (rhodamine ^{lo}) or Hoechst 33342 (side population).

== Function ==
Diagram of cells that arise from Hematopoietic stem cells during the process of hematopoiesis

=== Haematopoiesis ===
Hematopoietic stem cells are essential to haematopoiesis, the formation of the cells within blood. Hematopoietic stem cells can replenish all blood cell types (i.e., are multipotent) and self-renew. A small number of hematopoietic stem cells can expand to generate a very large number of daughter hematopoietic stem cells. This phenomenon is used in bone marrow transplantation, when a small number of hematopoietic stem cells reconstitute the hematopoietic system. This process indicates that, subsequent to bone marrow transplantation, symmetrical cell divisions into two daughter hematopoietic stem cells must occur.

Stem cell self-renewal is thought to occur in the stem cell niche in the bone marrow, and it is reasonable to assume that key signals present in this niche will be important in self-renewal. There is much interest in the environmental and molecular requirements for HSC self-renewal, as understanding the ability of HSC to replenish themselves will eventually allow the generation of expanded populations of HSC in vitro that can be used therapeutically.

=== Quiescence ===
Hematopoietic stem cells, like all adult stem cells, mostly exist in a state of quiescence, or reversible growth arrest. The altered metabolism of quiescent HSCs helps the cells survive for extended periods of time in the hypoxic bone marrow environment. When provoked by cell death or damage, Hematopoietic stem cells exit quiescence and begin actively dividing again. The transition from dormancy to propagation and back is regulated by the MEK/ERK pathway and PI3K/AKT/mTOR pathway. Dysregulation of these transitions can lead to stem cell exhaustion, or the gradual loss of active Hematopoietic stem cells in the blood system.

=== Mobility ===
Hematopoietic stem cells have a higher potential than other immature blood cells to pass the bone marrow barrier, and, thus, may travel in the blood from the bone marrow in one bone to another bone. If they settle in the thymus, they may develop into T cells. In the case of fetuses and other extramedullary hematopoiesis. Hematopoietic stem cells may also settle in the liver or spleen and develop.

This enables Hematopoietic stem cells to be harvested directly from the blood.

== Clinical significance ==
=== Transplant ===
Hematopoietic stem cell transplantation (HSCT) is the transplantation of multipotent hematopoietic stem cells, usually derived from bone marrow, peripheral blood, or umbilical cord blood. It may be autologous (the patient's own stem cells are used), allogeneic (the stem cells come from a donor) or syngeneic (from an identical twin).

It is most often performed for patients with certain cancers of the blood or bone marrow, such as multiple myeloma or leukemia. In these cases, the recipient's immune system is usually destroyed with radiation or chemotherapy before the transplantation. Infection and graft-versus-host disease are major complications of allogeneic HSCT.

In order to harvest stem cells from the circulating peripheral blood, blood donors are injected with a cytokine, such as granulocyte-colony stimulating factor (G-CSF), that induces cells to leave the bone marrow and circulate in the blood vessels. In mammalian embryology, the first definitive Hematopoietic stem cells are detected in the AGM (aorta-gonad-mesonephros), and then massively expanded in the fetal liver prior to colonising the bone marrow before birth.

Hematopoietic stem cell transplantation remains a dangerous procedure with many possible complications; it is reserved for patients with life-threatening diseases. As survival following the procedure has increased, its use has expanded beyond cancer to autoimmune diseases and hereditary skeletal dysplasias; notably malignant infantile osteopetrosis and mucopolysaccharidosis.

Stem cells can be used to regenerate different types of tissues. HCT is an established as therapy for chronic myeloid leukemia, acute lymphatic leukemia, aplastic anemia, and hemoglobinopathies, in addition to acute myeloid leukemia and primary immune deficiencies. Hematopoietic system regeneration is typically achieved within 2–4 weeks post-chemo- or irradiation therapy and HCT. HSCs are being clinically tested for their use in non-hematopoietic tissue regeneration.

=== Aging of hematopoietic stem cells ===
==== DNA damage ====
DNA strand breaks accumulate in long term hematopoietic stem cells during aging. This accumulation is associated with a broad attenuation of DNA repair and response pathways that depends on HSC quiescence. Non-homologous end joining (NHEJ) is a pathway that repairs double-strand breaks in DNA. NHEJ is referred to as "non-homologous" because the break ends are directly ligated without the need for a homologous template. The NHEJ pathway depends on several proteins including ligase 4, DNA polymerase mu and NHEJ factor 1 (NHEJ1, also known as Cernunnos or XLF).

DNA ligase 4 (Lig4) has a highly specific role in the repair of double-strand breaks by NHEJ. Lig4 deficiency in the mouse causes a progressive loss of hematopoietic stem cells during aging. Deficiency of lig4 in pluripotent stem cells results in accumulation of DNA double-strand breaks and enhanced apoptosis.

In polymerase mu mutant mice, hematopoietic cell development is defective in several peripheral and bone marrow cell populations with about a 40% decrease in bone marrow cell number that includes several hematopoietic lineages. Expansion potential of hematopoietic progenitor cells is also reduced. These characteristics correlate with reduced ability to repair double-strand breaks in hematopoietic tissue.

Deficiency of NHEJ factor 1 in mice leads to premature aging of hematopoietic stem cells as indicated by several lines of evidence including evidence that long-term repopulation is defective and worsens over time. Using a human induced pluripotent stem cell model of NHEJ1 deficiency, it was shown that NHEJ1 has an important role in promoting survival of the primitive hematopoietic progenitors. These NHEJ1 deficient cells possess a weak NHEJ1-mediated repair capacity that is apparently incapable of coping with DNA damages induced by physiological stress, normal metabolism, and ionizing radiation.

The sensitivity of hematopoietic stem cells to Lig4, DNA polymerase mu and NHEJ1 deficiency suggests that NHEJ is a key determinant of the ability of stem cells to maintain themselves against physiological stress over time. Rossi et al. found that endogenous DNA damage accumulates with age even in wild type Hematopoietic stem cells, and suggested that DNA damage accrual may be an important physiological mechanism of stem cell aging.

==== Loss of clonal diversity ====
A study shows the clonal diversity of hematopoietic stem cells gets drastically reduced around age 70 to a faster-growing few, substantiating a novel theory of ageing which could enable healthy aging. Of note, the shift in clonal diversity during aging was previously reported in 2008 for the murine system by the Christa Muller-Sieburg laboratory in San Diego, California.

== Research ==
=== Behavior in culture ===
A cobblestone area-forming cell (CAFC) assay is a cell culture-based empirical assay. When plated onto a confluent culture of stromal feeder layer, a fraction of hematopoietic stem cells creep between the gaps (even though the stromal cells are touching each other) and eventually settle between the stromal cells and the substratum (here the dish surface) or trapped in the cellular processes between the stromal cells. Emperipolesis is the in vivo phenomenon in which one cell is completely engulfed into another (e.g. thymocytes into thymic nurse cells); on the other hand, when in vitro, lymphoid lineage cells creep beneath nurse-like cells, the process is called pseudoemperipolesis. This similar phenomenon is more commonly known in the HSC field by the cell culture terminology cobble stone area-forming cells (CAFC), which means areas or clusters of cells look dull cobblestone-like under phase contrast microscopy, compared to the other hematopoietic stem cells, which are refractile. This happens because the cells that are floating loosely on top of the stromal cells are spherical and thus refractile. However, the cells that creep beneath the stromal cells are flattened and, thus, not refractile. The mechanism of pseudoemperipolesis is only recently coming to light. It may be mediated by interaction through CXCR4 (CD184) the receptor for CXC Chemokines (e.g., SDF1) and α4β1 integrins.

=== Repopulation kinetics ===
Hematopoietic stem cells (HSC) cannot be easily observed directly, and, therefore, their behaviors need to be inferred indirectly. Clonal studies are likely the closest technique for single cell in vivo studies of HSCs. Here, sophisticated experimental and statistical methods are used to ascertain that, with a high probability, a single HSC is contained in a transplant administered to a lethally irradiated host. The clonal expansion of this stem cell can then be observed over time by monitoring the percent donor-type cells in blood as the host is reconstituted. The resulting time series is defined as the repopulation kinetic of the HSC.

The reconstitution kinetics are very heterogeneous. However, using symbolic dynamics, one can show that they fall into a limited number of classes. To prove this, several hundred experimental repopulation kinetics from clonal Thy-1^{lo} SCA-1^{+} lin^{−}(B220, CD4, CD8, Gr-1, Mac-1 and Ter-119) c-kit^{+} HSC were translated into symbolic sequences by assigning the symbols "+", "-", "~" whenever two successive measurements of the percent donor-type cells have a positive, negative, or unchanged slope, respectively. By using the Hamming distance, the repopulation patterns were subjected to cluster analysis yielding 16 distinct groups of kinetics. To finish the empirical proof, the Laplace add-one approach was used to determine that the probability of finding kinetics not contained in these 16 groups is very small. By corollary, this result shows that the hematopoietic stem cell compartment is also heterogeneous by dynamical criteria.

It was originally believed that all hematopoietic stem cells were alike in their self-renewal and differentiation abilities. This view was first challenged by the 2002 discovery by the Muller-Sieburg group in San Diego, who illustrated that different stem cells can show distinct repopulation patterns that are epigenetically predetermined intrinsic properties of clonal Thy-1^{lo} Sca-1^{+} lin^{−} c-kit^{+} HSC. The results of these clonal studies led to the notion of lineage bias. Using the ratio $\rho = L/M$ of lymphoid (L) to myeloid (M) cells in blood as a quantitative marker, the stem cell compartment can be split into three categories of HSC. Balanced (Bala) hematopoietic stem cells repopulate peripheral white blood cells in the same ratio of myeloid to lymphoid cells as seen in unmanipulated mice (on average about 15% myeloid and 85% lymphoid cells, or 3 ≤ ρ ≤ 10). Myeloid-biased (My-bi) hematopoietic stem cells give rise to very few lymphocytes resulting in ratios 0 < ρ < 3, while lymphoid-biased (Ly-bi) hematopoietic stem cells generate very few myeloid cells, which results in lymphoid-to-myeloid ratios of ρ > 10. All three types are normal types of HSC, and they do not represent stages of differentiation. Rather, these are three classes of HSC, each with an epigenetically fixed differentiation program. These studies also showed that lineage bias is not stochastically regulated or dependent on differences in environmental influence. My-bi HSC self-renew longer than balanced or Ly-bi HSC. The myeloid bias results from reduced responsiveness to the lymphopoetin interleukin 7 (IL-7).

Subsequently, other groups confirmed and highlighted the original findings. For example, the Eaves group confirmed in 2007 that repopulation kinetics, long-term self-renewal capacity, and My-bi and Ly-bi are stably inherited intrinsic HSC properties. In 2010, the Goodell group provided additional insights about the molecular basis of lineage bias in side population (SP) SCA-1^{+} lin^{−} c-kit^{+} HSC. As previously shown for IL-7 signaling, it was found that a member of the transforming growth factor family (TGF-beta) induces and inhibits the proliferation of My-bi and Ly-bi HSC, respectively.

== Etymology ==
From Greek haimato-, combining form of haima 'blood', and from the Latinized form of Greek poietikos 'capable of making, creative, productive', from poiein 'to make, create'.

== See also ==
- Hematopoietic stem cell niche
- List of distinct cell types in the adult human body
