= Haematopoietic system =

Organs that make blood cells

- Sites of haematopoiesis periods before and after birth

Details
- Function: Creation of the cells of blood

Identifiers
- MeSH: D006413
- FMA: 9667

The haematopoietic system (spelled hematopoietic system in American English) is the system in the body involved in the creation of the cells of blood.

== Structure ==
=== Stem cells ===
Haematopoietic stem cells (HSCs) reside in the medulla of the bone (bone marrow) and have the unique ability to give rise to all of the different mature blood cell types and tissues. HSCs are self-renewing cells: when they differentiate, at least some of their daughter cells remain as HSCs, so the pool of stem cells is not depleted. This phenomenon is called asymmetric division. The other daughters of HSCs (myeloid and lymphoid progenitor cells) can follow any of the other differentiation pathways that lead to the production of one or more specific types of blood cell, but cannot renew themselves. The pool of progenitors is heterogeneous and can be divided into two groups; long-term self-renewing HSC and only transiently self-renewing HSC, also called short-terms. This is one of the main vital processes in the body.

=== Development ===
In developing embryos, blood formation occurs in aggregates of blood cells in the yolk sac, called blood islands. As development progresses, blood formation occurs in the spleen, liver and lymph nodes. When bone marrow develops, it eventually assumes the task of forming most of the blood cells for the entire organism. However, maturation, activation, and some proliferation of lymphoid cells occurs in the spleen, thymus, and lymph nodes. In children, haematopoiesis occurs in the marrow of the long bones such as the femur and tibia. In adults, it occurs mainly in the pelvis, cranium, vertebrae, and sternum.

== Function ==
Haematopoiesis (from Greek αἷμα, "blood" and ποιεῖν "to make"; also hematopoiesis in American English; sometimes also haemopoiesis or hemopoiesis) is the formation of blood cellular components. All cellular blood components are derived from haematopoietic stem cells. In a healthy adult person, approximately 10^{11}–10^{12} new blood cells are produced daily in order to maintain steady state levels in the peripheral circulation.

All blood cells are divided into three lineages.

- Red blood cells, also called erythrocytes, are the oxygen-carrying cells. Erythrocytes are functional and are released into the blood. The number of reticulocytes, immature red blood cells, gives an estimate of the rate of erythropoiesis.
- Lymphocytes are the cornerstone of the adaptive immune system. They are derived from common lymphoid progenitors. The lymphoid lineage is composed of T-cells, B-cells and natural killer cells. This is lymphopoiesis.
- Cells of the myeloid lineage, which include granulocytes, megakaryocytes and macrophages, are derived from common myeloid progenitors, and are involved in such diverse roles as innate immunity and blood clotting. This is myelopoiesis.

== Clinical significance ==
=== Stem cell transplant ===
A stem cell transplant is a transplant intended to replace the progenitor haematopoietic stem cells

Haematopoietic stem cell transplantation (HSCT) is the transplantation of multipotent haematopoietic stem cells, usually derived from bone marrow, peripheral blood, or umbilical cord blood. It may be autologous (the patient's own stem cells are used), allogeneic (the stem cells come from a donor) or syngeneic (from an identical twin).

It is most often performed for patients with certain cancers of the blood or bone marrow, such as multiple myeloma or leukemia. In these cases, the recipient's immune system is usually destroyed with radiation or chemotherapy before the transplantation. Infection and graft-versus-host disease are major complications of allogeneic HSCT.

Haematopoietic stem cell transplantation remains a dangerous procedure with many possible complications; it is reserved for patients with life-threatening diseases. As survival following the procedure has increased, its use has expanded beyond cancer to autoimmune diseases and hereditary skeletal dysplasias; notably malignant infantile osteopetrosis and mucopolysaccharidosis.

== See also ==
- Hematopoietic stem cell niche – Biological term
