= Boasso =

Boasso is a surname. Notable people with the surname include:

- Martín Boasso (born 1975), Argentine footballer
- Walter Boasso (born 1960), American businessman and politician

== See also ==
- Basso (surname)
