= Hematopoietic stem cell niche =

Biological term

Many human blood cells, such as red blood cells (RBCs), immune cells, and even platelets all originate from the same progenitor cell, the hematopoietic stem cell (HSC). As these cells are short-lived, there needs to be a steady turnover of new blood cells and the maintenance of an HSC pool. This is broadly termed hematopoiesis. This event requires a special environment, termed the hematopoietic stem cell niche, which provides the protection and signals necessary to carry out the differentiation of cells from HSC progenitors. This stem-cell niche relocates from the yolk sac to eventually rest in the bone marrow of mammals. Many pathological states can arise from disturbances in this niche environment, highlighting its importance in maintaining hematopoiesis. Recent study marks the first global discovery of hematopoietic stem cell (HSC) niches within invertebrate skeletons—overturning the long-held belief that skeletal hematopoiesis is unique to vertebrates, offering a novel evolutionary perspective on stem cell biology.

== Hematopoiesis ==
Hematopoiesis involves a series of differentiation steps from one progenitor cell to a more committed cell type, forming the recognizable tree seen in the adjacent diagram. Pluripotent long-term (LT)-HSCs self-renew to maintain the HSC pool, as well as differentiate into short-term (ST)-HSCs. Through various knock-out models, several transcription factors have been found to be essential in this differentiation, such as RUNX1 and TAL1 (also known as SCL).

Overview of Hematopoiesis

ST-HSCs can then differentiate into either the common myeloid progenitor (CMP) or the common lymphoid progenitor (CLP). The CLP then goes on to differentiate into more committed lymphoid precursor cells. The CMP can then further differentiate into the megakaryocyte–erythroid progenitor cell (MEP), which goes on to make RBCs and platelets, or the granulocyte/macrophage progenitor (GMP), which gives rise to the granulocytes of the innate immune response. MEP differentiation was found to be contingent upon the transcription factor GATA1, whereas GMP differentiation needs SPI1. When expression of either was inhibited by morpholino in zebrafish, the other lineage programming pathway resulted.

There are 2 types of hematopoiesis that occur in humans:

1. Primitive hematopoiesis – blood stem cells differentiate into only a few specialized blood lineages (typically isolated to early fetal development).
2. Definitive hematopoiesis – multipotent HSCs appear (occurs through the majority of human lifetime).

== Historical development of the theory ==
The pioneering work of Till and McCulloch in 1961 experimentally confirmed the development of blood cells from a single precursor hematopoietic stem cell (HSC), creating the framework for the field of hematopoiesis to be studied over the following decades. In 1978, after observing that the prototypical colony-forming stem cells were less capable at replacing differentiated cells than bone marrow cells injected into irradiated animals, Schofield proposed that a specialized environment in the bone marrow allows these precursor cells to maintain their cellular reconstitution potential.

During this time, the field exploded with studies aimed at determining the components of the "hematopoietic stem cell niche" that made this possible. Dexter observed that mesenchymal stromal cells could maintain early HSCs ex vivo, and both Lord and Gong showed that these cells localized to the endosteal margins in long bones. These studies and others supported the idea that bone cells create the HSC niche, and all the research that elucidated this specialized hematopoietic microenvironment stemmed from these landmark studies.

== Niche localization through early fetal development ==
=== Yolk sac and the hemangioblast theory ===
Despite the vast work done in this field, there is still controversy over the origins of definitive HSCs. Primitive hematopoiesis is first found in the blood islands (Pander's islands) of the yolk sac at E7.5 (embryonic day 7.5) in mice and 30dpc (30 days post-conception) in humans. As the embryo requires rapid oxygenation due to its high mitotic activity, these islands are the main source of red blood cell (RBC) production via fusing endothelial cells (ECs) with the developing embryonic circulation.

The hemangioblast theory, which posits that the RBCs and ECs derive from a common progenitor cell, was developed as researchers observed that receptor knockout mice, such as Flk1-/-, exhibited defective RBC formation and vessel growth. A year later, Choi showed that blast cells derived from embryonic stem (ES) cells displayed common gene expression of both hematopoietic and endothelial precursors. However, Ueno and Weissman provided the earliest contradiction to the hemangioblast theory when they saw that distinct ES cells mixed into a blastocyst resulted in more than 1 ES cell contributing to the majority of the blood islands found in the resultant embryo. Other studies done in zebrafish have more soundly indicated the existence of the hemangioblast. While the hemangioblast theory appears to be generally supported, most of the studies done have been in vitro, indicating a need for in vivo studies to elucidate its existence.

=== Aorta-gonad-mesonephros region ===
Definitive hematopoiesis then occurs later in the aorta-gonad-mesonephros (AGM), a region of embryonic mesoderm that develops into the ventral wall of the dorsal aorta, at E10.5 in mice and 4wpc (4 weeks post-conception) in humans. New HSCs either enter the aortic circulation or remain within the endothelium. While Notch 1 has been found to stimulate aortic HSC production, Runx1 overexpression in the zebrafish mutant mindbomb that lacks Notch signaling rescues HSC production, suggesting Runx1 is downstream of Notch1. Hedgehog signaling is also required for HSC production in the AGM. ECs located in this niche have been found to support new HSCs through the upregulation of factors such as p57 and IGF2. The relocalization of hemogenic endothelium coincides with the migration of distinct endothelial precursors to the AGM.

== Niche relocation through late fetal development ==
=== Placenta and the fetal liver ===
Hematopoiesis then moves from the AGM to the placenta and fetal liver at E11.5 in mice and 5wpc in humans. While the engraftment of HSCs at these sites are still being elucidated, the interaction between the chemokine CXCL12 expressed by stromal cells and its receptor CXCR4 expressed on HSCs has been proposed as one mechanism. In addition, the cytokine-receptor binding of SCF and KIT have been recognized for its importance in HSC function and amplification of the chemotactic induction of CXCL12.

Additional factors that are important in HSC migration during this period are Integrins, N-cadherin, and Osteopontin that can stimulate Wnt signaling in HSCs. Transcription factors such as PITX2 must be expressed in stromal cells to support normal HSC function. Like with the AGM, the relocation of fetal liver HSCs coincides with the differentiation of functional units, in this case hepatoblasts to hepatocytes. Mice have also shown hematopoietic activity in the umbilical arteries and the allantois, in which HSCs and endothelial cells are colocalized.

=== Bone marrow ===
Hematopoiesis then moves to the bone marrow at E18 in mice and 12wpc in humans, where it will reside permanently for the remainder of the individual's lifetime. In mice, there is a shift from the fetal liver to the spleen at E14, where it persists for many weeks postnatally while it occurs simultaneously in the bone marrow. This relocalization is thought to be supported by the development of osteoblast and chondrocyte precursor cells capable of forming an HSC niche. In addition to the previously mentioned signals that induce HSC migration, TIE2-angiopoietin and CD44-E-cadherin binding appears to be important for this event to occur, as well as for the retention of these HSCs once they are in the bone marrow.

HSCs in the bone marrow do not show the same characteristics as those in other niches. HSCs in fetal liver display increased cell divisions, whereas adult bone marrow HSCs are mostly quiescent. This difference stems, in part, from signaling discrepancies in the two niches. Sox17 has been identified as crucial for the generation of fetal, but not adult, HSCs. Inactivation of Runx1 in adult HSCs does not impair function, but rather prevents the differentiation of specific lineages. Differences such as these in the reactivity of HSCs from different niches suggests that the signaling found there is not the same.

== Composition of the bone marrow niche ==
In addition to the cytokines and cell signaling molecules mentioned above, the HSC niche in the bone marrow provides soluble factors, forces, and cell-mediated interactions necessary to maintain the hematopoietic potential of the stem cells located there. This niche is generally separated into 2 sections:

1. Endosteal niche-the outer edge of the bone marrow that contains osteocytes, bone matrix, and quiescent HSCs.
2. Perivascular niche-the inner core of the bone marrow that contains actively dividing HSCs, sinusoidal endothelium, CARs (CXCL12-abundant reticular cells), and MSCs (Mesenchymal stem cells).

=== Acellular factors ===
Recent studies have used hypoxic-staining dyes, such as Hoechst stain, to show that quiescent LT-HSCs and osteoblasts are found in hypoxic and poorly perfused areas of the bone marrow, while ECs and MSCs were found in well-perfused areas. However, this hypoxia may be only caused in part by the niche environment, and the HSCs themselves may be maintaining their hypoxic environment in order to remain quiescent. This oxygen tension upregulates HIF1A, which shifts energy production to glycolysis, allowing for the cell to survive in oxygen-poor surroundings. Indeed, deletion of HIF1A increases HSC proliferation and eventually depletes the LT-HSC storage pool. This suggests that the hypoxic environment of the bone marrow, partially determined by the distance from the sinusoids of the perivascular niche, maintains the quiescent state of LT-HSCs in an effort to retain stem cells with differentiation potential.

It has also been found that calcium ions can act as chemotactic signals to HSCs via the G protein–coupled receptor (GPCR) calcium-sensing receptor (CaSR). CaSR knockout mice have shown hematopoietic cells in the circulation and spleen, but few in the bone marrow, indicating this receptor's importance in this particular niche. Conversely, stimulation of HSC CaSR via its agonist cinacalcet increases migration and engraftment of these cells in the bone marrow. Finally, osteoclast inhibition by the bisphosphonate alendronate has correlated with decreased HSCs and bone marrow engraftment. Taken together, these results suggest that the high calcium ion concentration found in the endosteal niche due to osteoclast activity acts as a homing signal to HSCs for engraftment into the bone marrow via the CaSR.

Thirdly, the shearing forces experienced by HSCs from circulating cells has been suggested to play a role in hematopoietic activation. Fetal HSCs in the AGM have shown upregulated Runx1 in response to these forces, which would result in significant hematopoietic regulation in these cells. Despite the differences between the AGM and bone marrow, both are subjected to the circulation, and it is entirely possible that these same forces exist in this adult stem cell niche. Other characteristics, such as strain, geometry, and ligand profiles of the extracellular matrix (ECM) have been suggested as important in the maintenance of stem cell potential in these niches. Finally, the elasticity modulus of the ECM, partially provided by MSCs in the bone marrow, has been shown to direct the differentiation and activity of stem cells nearby. The landscape of the HSC niche in the bone marrow is constantly changing, and the acellular factors, as much as the cellular factors, are beginning to reveal the complexity of hematopoietic regulation.

=== Cellular factors ===
Osteoblasts, bone-forming cells, interact with HSCs and provide proliferative signals. Studies that have increased or decreased osteoblasts have shown a similar increase or decrease, respectively, in the number of HSCs. Coculturing endosteal cells with HSCs was also found to be sufficient in maintaining their differentiation potential long-term, presumably through the secretion of the cell signaling molecules previously mentioned. These HSCs that interact with the endosteal osteoblasts display a quiescent phenotype, as shown in both ex vivo and in vivo imaging studies, whereas HSCs that are more actively dividing show less interaction. These results of less active HSCs interacting with the endosteal niche agree with previous results looking at the activity state of HSCs throughout the bone marrow.

In addition to osteoblasts, HSCs interact with many mesenchymal cells as they make their way to the sinusoids in the perivascular niche. Removal of nestin-expressing MSCs has shown a significant decrease in LT-HSCs. These cells secrete high levels of CXCL12 and closely associate with sympathetic nerves that influence cytokine-induced migration of HSCs. Similar to these cells, CAR cells have correlated with reduced HSCs and LT-HSC activity when ablated. One difference between these cell types, despite the similarity in function, is that CAR cells may be found in both endosteal and perivascular niches, while nestin-positive MSCs are found exclusively in the perivascular niche.

Both ECs and adipocytes have been suggested to influence HSC activity in the bone marrow. Studies using antibody-mediated disruption of the VEGF receptors on ECs correlated with poor engraftment of donor cells. HUVECs, or endothelial cells isolated from umbilical veins, that were programmed via viral gene manipulation to signal through the Notch and Angiopoietin pathways were found to support and maintain LT-HSCs. Despite the difficulty in isolating sinusoidal ECs, experimental evidence suggests that these cells may play a role in regulating HSCs. Current research suggests that adipocytes in the bone marrow negatively regulate HSC activity. HSCs isolated from adipocyte-rich vertebrae displayed decreased activity. In addition, isolation of adipocyte-containing stromal cells have shown adipocyte inhibition of the ability of HSCs to proliferate and form hematopoietic colonies.

Finally, leukocytes may influence HSCs directly or indirectly. For instance, B lymphocytes influence above stromal cells via the neurotransmitter acetylcholine.

== Dysregulation ==
=== Cancer ===
Of the many transcriptional regulators of hematopoiesis, nearly all induce leukemia when aberrant. Chromosomal translocation is a hallmark of leukemia, and TAL1-induced translocation deregulates expression at the locus, while RUNX1-induced translocation results in chimeric fusion proteins. These chimeric transcription factors can result in the improper repression or activation of the target gene, as well as the inappropriate recruitment of chromatin-modifying enzymes. PAX5 and Notch mutations can result in B-cell and T-cell leukemias, respectively. Dysregulation of stromal cells can in some cases induce genetic lesions in hematopoietic compartment; for example, mutations in the osteoblastic lineage cells resulted in malignant hematopoiesis. Osteoblasts may also be dysregulated by the presence of solid tumors (outside the bone marrow); one study showed that mouse lung tumors increased osteoblast activity and numbers and that these cells were important to the outgrowth of the tumor in the lung via the production of tumor-infiltrating neutrophils.

Additionally, during and before metastasis, hematopoietic stem cells are overabundant in bone marrow, lungs, and muscles. This is especially true in patients who develop metastatic relapse. This suggests that the hematopoietic stem cell niche may be part of a key mechanism of how cancer spreads throughout the body.

=== Cardiovascular disease ===
The hematopoietic niche is affected by cardiovascular disease, as the relative frequencies of stromal niche cells as well as their phenotypes are changing. These alterations depend on the specific condition and trigger changes in blood cell production. Diabetes influences bone marrow endothelium, which may alter myeloid leukocyte generation. This may be relevant for diabetes-associated morbidities such as atherosclerosis. Hypertension and atherosclerosis trigger endothelial dysfunction and myocardial infarction induces angiogenesis in the bone marrow.

=== Inflammation ===
Osteoblasts may be involved in other inflammatory systemic diseases, which is supported by studies using mouse models of sepsis. Mesenchymal cells' response to β-adrenergic stimulation is altered in diabetes, which impairs G-CSF-induced HSCP mobilization.
