= Basi (disambiguation) =

Basi or BASI may refer to:

- Basi, a sugar cane wine
- Basi (giant panda), a female giant panda
- Bureau of Air Safety Investigation (BASI), now part of the Australian Transport Safety Bureau
- Bureau of Air Safety Investigation (Pakistan)
- Bulletin of the Astronomical Society of India, the quarterly journal of the Astronomical Society of India

== See also ==
- Baci
- Bassi (disambiguation)
