= Niur =

Island in Riau, Indonesia

Coordinates: 0°25′43″S 103°27′03″E

Niur is an island in Riau province close to the east coast of Sumatra island, Indonesia. It is situated just south of Baso (island). The area of the island is 342 km^{2}.
