= Dumisani Kumalo =

South African diplomat and anti-apartheid activist (1947–2019)

South African Ambassador to the United Nations
- In office 1999–2009
- President: Thabo Mbeki
- Preceded by: Josiah Khiphusizi Jele
- Succeeded by: Baso Sangqu

Personal details
- Born: Dumisani Shadrack Kumalo; September 16, 1947 Kwambunda, Natal, South Africa
- Died: January 20, 2019 (aged 71) Midrand, Gauteng, South Africa
- Cause of death: Asthma
- Spouse: Tikky
- Children: 2

Dumisani Shadrack Kumalo (16 September 1947 – 20 January 2019) was a South African anti-apartheid activist and diplomat, who served as the Permanent Representative of South Africa to the United Nations.

== Early life ==
He was born in Kwambunda, Natal on the banks of the Blood River. His father was a carpenter and preacher and his mother a counsellor and midwife. The family soon moved to Evaton, south of Johannesburg. He was educated at missionary school, Wilburforce College in Evaton. He would later obtain a Bachelor of Arts from the University of South Africa and later in exile, a Master of Arts from Indiana University. He started work as a journalist in 1967, working for the Golden City Post, feature writer for DRUM from 1969 until 1970, and as a political reporter for the Johannesburg Sunday Times in 1970. After the Soweto Riots in 1976, he joined Total Oil as a marketing executive.

== Political life ==
In 1977 he was forced into exile for his anti-apartheid activities and sought asylum in the United States, where he continued his political activity. As Project Director at the American Committee on Africa (ACOA) and its sister organisation The Africa Fund from 1979 to 1997 he played a key role in the mobilisation of U.S. sanctions against apartheid. He helped to build the divestment movement which led to 28 states, 24 counties and more than 90 cities and 155 colleges and universities divesting from U.S. banks and companies which did business with the South African government. He visited almost every state in the union, testifying before state legislatures and city councils and speaking in communities and at countless colleges and universities. After the end of apartheid he returned to South Africa and was appointed Director of the United States Desk in the Department of Foreign Affairs in 1997. Kumalo was subsequently appointed as South Africa's Permanent Representative to the United Nations; he presented his credentials as Permanent Representative on 21 April 1999.

He spoke to the United Nations General Assembly on 13 April 2004, encouraging participation of the member nations of the United Nations, on the matter of the Kimberley Process Certification Scheme.

He was on the Advisory Committee of the African Activist Archive Project of the African Studies Center at Michigan State University.

He returned to South Africa in 2009 and until 2013, he was CEO of the Thabo Mbeki Foundation.

== Death ==
Kumalo died at his home in Midrand after an asthma attack. He was survived by his wife Tikky and two sons.

Diplomatic posts
Preceded by Josiah Khiphusizi Jele	South African Ambassador to the United Nations; 21 April 1999 – 16 March 2009	Succeeded by Baso Sangqu
