= Christa Muller-Sieburg =

German-American Immunologist and Hematologist

Christa Edith Muller-Sieburg
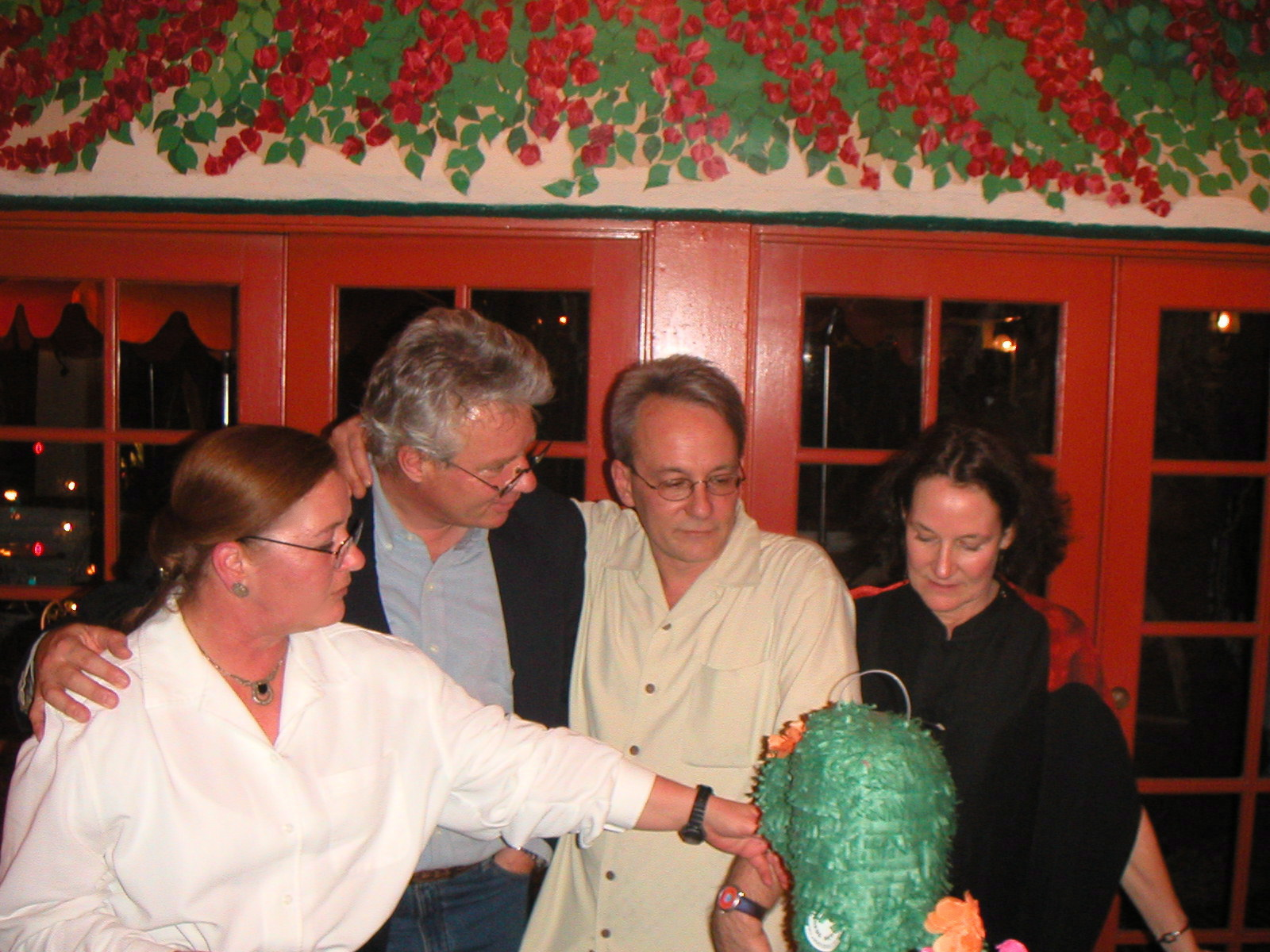
- Christa Muller-Sieburg (left) in San Diego
- Born: Christa Edith Muller; 19 February 1952; Koeln, Germany
- Died: 12 January 2013 (aged 60); San Diego, United States of America
- Education: University of Cologne; Faculty of Natural Sciences (PhD)
- Known for: Purification of hematopoietic stem cells; Clonal heterogeneity of hematopoietic stem cells; Characterization of lineage bias; Aging theory of hematopoietic system
- Spouse: Hans B Sieburg
- Children: None
- Scientific career
- Fields: Immunology; Hematology
- Workplaces: University of Cologne; Stanford University; Sanford Burnham Prebys
- Thesis: Regulation of the expression of idiotopic antibodies by isotope variants of monoclonal anti-idiotopic antibodies (1983)
- Doctoral advisor: Klaus Rajewsky

Christa Edith Muller-Sieburg (19 February 1952 – 12 January 2013) was a German-American immunologist and hematologist, whose work became central to the understanding of the clonal heterogeneity of hematopoietic stem cells (HSCs). Muller-Sieburg is known for her contributions to the purification of hematopoietic stem cells, the characterization of individual stem cell clones and her revision of the process of hematopoiesis.

Muller-Sieburg was a co-discoverer of the negative marker set of hematopoietic stem cells that led to the modern purification techniques widely used in hematopoietic stem cell research today. She was the first to demonstrate the biased differentiation behavior of individual stem cell clones, thereby sparking a novel and entirely original view of hematopoiesis.

== Biography ==
Muller-Sieburg received her Abitur in 1972 in Bonn, West Germany. The same year, she moved to Köln to begin her studies in biology at the University of Cologne. She completed her studies under the guidance of Klaus Rajewsky in 1978 with a diploma thesis in immunology entitled "Investigations concerning the Class Specificity of the Fc-Receptor on Murine Lymphocytes Using Monoclonal Antibodies" at the Institut für Genetik. She received her doctorate in the natural sciences in 1983 with a dissertation entitled "Regulation of the Expression of Idiotopic Antibodies by Isotype Variants of Monoclonal Anti-Idiotopic Antibodies" (advisor: Klaus Rajewsky).

Muller-Sieburg married Hans B. Sieburg, a mathematician whom she had met in 1972 while studying at the University of Cologne.

Muller-Sieburg died on 12 January 2013 of a squamous cell carcinoma, after nine years of illness, during which time she was still actively working.

== Academic career ==
In 1983, Muller-Sieburg and her husband, Hans B. Sieburg, moved to the United States of America, both as fellows of the Deutsche Forschungsgemeinschaft (German Research Foundation) at Stanford University. There, Muller-Sieburg began her research at the laboratory of Irving Weissman at the Stanford University Medical Center, while H. Sieburg worked and taught at the Stanford Mathematics Department.

Muller-Sieburg's research at Weissman's lab was focused on the identification of a common cell precursor for both T cells and B cells. She worked closely with Cheryl Ann Whitlock, who came to Weissman's lab from Owen Witte's lab also to work on the B cell precursor problem. The results of their collaboration were reported in a joint paper, describing for the first time the isolation of an early committed pre-pre-B cell along with the discovery of a hematopoietic stem cell population expressing low levels of Thy-1 antigen. The marker Thy-1(low) was crucial to establishing the exclusion criteria for the purification of HSCs.

In 1986, Muller-Sieburg and her husband moved to La Jolla, California, where she continued her work on the characterization and maintenance of hematopoietic stem cells at the Eli Lilly Research Institute led by Dr. Jacques M. Chiller, while Hans Sieburg initially joined the laboratory of Melvin Cohn at the Salk Institute for Biological Studies and later, became faculty at the University of California, San Diego.

In 1989, Muller-Sieburg became an independent group leader at the Medical Biology Institute in La Jolla, where she expanded her work on the purification and maintenance of hematopoietic stem cells via long-term bone marrow cultures – a technique she had developed in collaboration with Cheryl Whitlock, George F Tidmarsh and Irving Weissman at Stanford. By using this technique, Muller Sieburg and Elena Deryugina identified the growth factor, namely macrophage-colony stimulating factor (M-CSF) as a cytokine critical for the maintenance of stromal cell support for hematopoietic stem cells.

Muller-Sieburg's recognition as a leading scientist in the field of experimental hematology, led to her appointment as a professor and head of the stem cell program at the Sidney Kimmel Cancer Center, La Jolla in 1998, and, subsequently, as a professor at the Sanford Burnham Medical Research Institute (later: Sanford Burnham Prebys), from 2009 until her death.

During her research career Muller-Sieburg published more than 50 articles in peer-reviewed journals, wrote several invited book chapters, and co-authored one book on hematopoietic stem cells.

Muller-Sieburg was frequently invited to national and international conferences and symposia. Muller-Sieburg gave her last invited lecture "The Life of a Hematopoietic Stem Cell" at the Keystone Symposium "The Life of a Stem Cell: From Birth to Death" in March 2012. In 2013, the Christa Muller-Sieburg award was named after her by the International Society of Experimental Hematology.

== Research ==
=== Immunology ===
While working at the University of Cologne, Muller-Sieburg addressed a key element of idiotype network theory postulated by Niels Kaj Jerne, namely the enigmatic shift from one to another class of immunoglobulins produced by the same clone on B-lymphocytes. By making sequential sub-lines from an original hybridoma line, she discovered immunoglobulin class switch and described it in her 1983 paper published with Klaus Rajewsky. The following year, they co-authored an important paper on the regulation of the isotype switch by anti-idiotype antibodies. This ground-breaking paper was recognized and cited by Niels K. Jerne in his Nobel Prize acceptance lecture on 8 December 1984.

=== Hematology ===
==== Purification of hematopoietic stem cells ====
Muller-Sieburg accomplished separation of whole bone marrow into two fractions, the adherent and non-adherent fractions, and demonstrated that the latter fraction was the one that comprised B cell precursors. She found that it was not the B220-positive fraction that contained B-cell precursors as was expected, but the B220-negative fraction. She confirmed that B220+ cells were too late in the lineage to make B cells let alone T cells and myeloid cell types. Importantly, this B220-negative population was enriched for cells that were capable of reconstituting all types of blood cells for life when transplanted into lethally irradiated hosts ("complete repopulation capacity"). Complete repopulation capacity is the property which distinguishes hematopoietic stem cells from all other blood cell types. For their work on hematopoietic stem cell purification, Muller-Sieburg and collaborators were awarded a United States patent.

==== Genetic control of stem cell frequency ====
Muller-Sieburg was one of the first to recognize the need of maintaining HSC multi-lineage and self-renewal potentials while propagating HSCs in vitro. A sequence of publications in the 1990s established Muller-Sieburg as a pioneer of stromal-stem cell culture methodology. In the course of this work, Muller-Sieburg noticed that the frequency of HSCs - a measure of proliferative capacity - is under genetic control. In a 1996 landmark study, she and collaborators reported the discovery of the hematopoietic stem cell frequency gene on chromosome 1 in the murine system, which they named Scfr1 (stem cell frequency regulator 1). In a follow-up study in 2000, Muller-Sieburg and co-workers showed that the genetic control of HSC frequency is mostly cell-autonomous. By 2008, Scfr1 had become integrated into the group of genes and gene networks that specify "stemness" and cell fate decisions.

==== Heterogeneity of the hematopoietic stem cell population ====
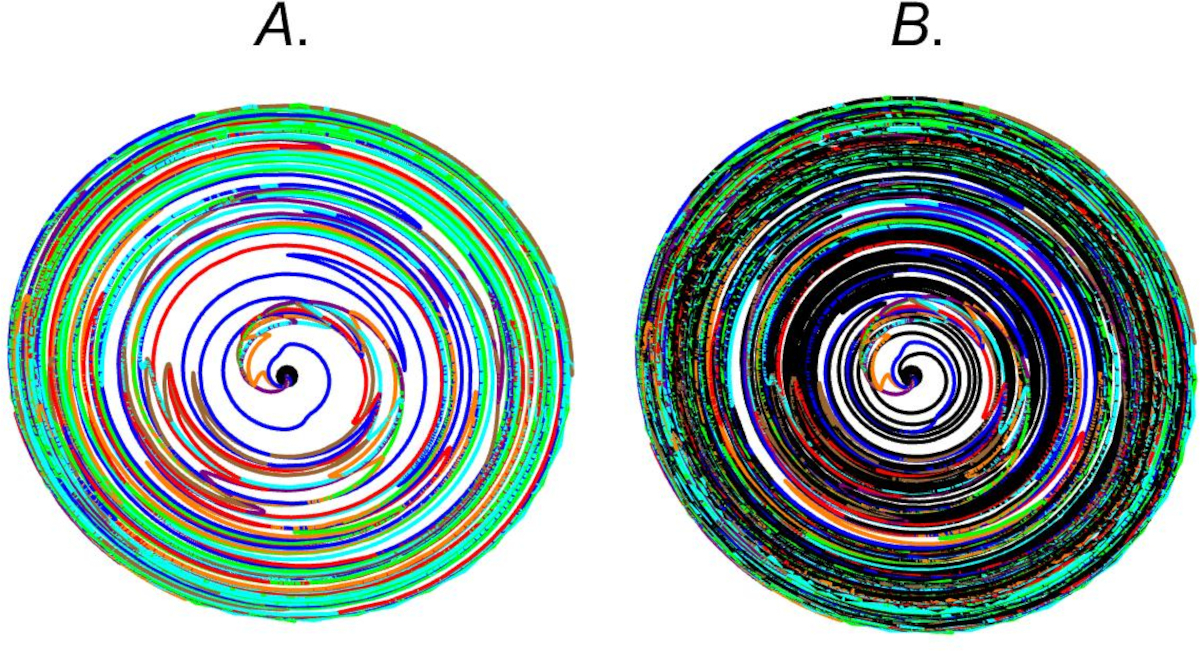
Influence Spread of Muller-Sieburg Stem Cell Heterogeneity. The graphics show the spread in the literature of Muller-Sieburg's concepts of stem cell heterogeneity, myeloid bias, lymphoid bias and balanced HSC differentiation behaviors starting from the year 2000 (black dot at center) to the year 2023 (outer boundary). A: Seven major journal were used: Blood (Blue), Exp Hematol (Orange), Cell Stem Cell (Red), Frontiers in Immunology (Green), J Exp Med (Cyan), PNAS (Brown), and Nature (Purple). B: The same expansion graphic with PubMed citation spread included (Black). Raw data were harvested from the Dimensions database using the keywords "hematopoietic stem cell", "heterogeneity", "myeloid-biased", "lymphoid-biased". Data were processed using a Wolfram Language program developed and applied by Hans B Sieburg.

The last 15 years of her life, Muller-Sieburg worked on the clonal fabric of hematopoiesis, making pioneering contributions to the foundations and practice of the science of blood. Based on her 1996 studies of the heterogeneity of the hematopoietic microenvironment, Muller-Sieburg increasingly doubted the then pervasive belief that "all stem cells are created equal", a view that, if true, would imply that blood is mono-clonal. To gain clarity, she followed the kinetics of individual HSCs and showed that blood generated by one individual hematopoietic stem cell differs significantly from the blood of another individual HSC by (a) the lifespan of the underlying stem cell population and (b) the composition by blood cell types relative to each other. Her discovery demonstrated that, in fact, the opposite of the dogmatic view of stem cell homogeneity is the case. Namely, she showed that whole blood is the poly-clonal mixture of the hematopoietic systems generated and maintained by individual stem cells actively functioning during any given period of time.

These results that whole blood is composed of many individual bloods were obtained by single-cell experiments using limiting dilution for cell sorting and serial transplantation. In this approach, an initial transplant containing one hematopoietic stem cell extracted from lineage negative (Lin-) blood cells is used to rescue a lethally irradiated host with mono-clonal blood. The results from these serial transplantation experiments, lasting from 7 months up to five years, led Muller-Sieburg to quantitatively analyze sets of stem cell kinetics with H. Sieburg. These analyses led to the discovery of quantitative determinants of clonal heterogeneity and the confirmation of Muller-Sieburg's conjecture that specific purification methods might restrict the repertoire of purified HSC, emphasizing that caution be taken in interpreting experimental results from a specific set of HSCs to be true for all HSCs This work laid the clonal foundations of modern hematology.

=== Quantitative determinants of clonal heterogeneity ===
Based on her experimental data, Muller-Sieburg suggested to replace the dogmatic view of the homogeneity of the stem cell population with the new concept of clonal diversity within the population of hematopoietic stem cells. She showed that the heterogeneity of the differentiation potential of adult hematopoietic stem cells is epigenetically fixed before birth and that no new heterogeneity of differentiation potential is introduced by self-renewal in postnatal hematopoiesis. Muller-Sieburg showed definitively that, therefore, an organism's blood is the mixture of blood cells contributed by distinct hematopoietic stem cell clones during the organism's lifetime. The process of blood formation (hematopoiesis) acts on the fixed repertoire of heterogeneous stem cell clones.

==== Clonal lifespan ====
According to the dogmatic view of stem cell homogeneity the lifespan of individual HSCs (defined as the time period for which an HSC can divide without differentiation) was assumed to be approximately the same. However, Muller-Sieburg experiments demonstrated that the longevity of hematopoietic stem cell clones differed dramatically. Specifically, she showed that clonal bloods became deficient in one or more cell types – a definitive observable of the extinction of their clone-maintaining stem cell population – after significantly different lengths of time. Some of these clone-maintaining hematopoietic stem cells survived multiple sequential in vitro-in vivo transplantations, which exceeded several times the normal life expectancy of the host. These results allowed Muller-Sieburg to establish the clonal lifespan as a quantitative measure of the reliability of self-renewal capacity.

At the same time, consistent with clonal heterogeneity, she showed that the differentiation capacity of individual HSCs is (a) limited and (b) dependent on the clone founder. Therefore, Muller-Sieburg also established the variability in differentiation capacity as a quantitative measure of clonal heterogeneity and clonal lifespan.

Furthermore, Muller-Sieburg's clonal experiments showed that the life of a hematopoietic stem cell (clone) is highly dependent on the initial conditions given by the epigenetically fixed differentiation and self-renewal capacities of each clone founding HSC.

==== Lineage bias ====
Muller-Sieburg showed that murine hematopoietic stem cells form a heterogeneous cell population with respect to their differentiation and proliferation behaviors. As a consequence of this clonal heterogeneity principle, whole blood represents as a mixture of "bloods" originating from many active stem cell clones. Within each clonal blood, all HSCs form a homogeneous core population whose members have the same lifespan and carry the memory of the differentiation and self-renewal capacities of the founder HSC. By comparing the intra-clonal kinetics of the leukocyte sub-populations, Muller-Sieburg showed that all hematopoietic stem cells belong to and stay for life in one of three classes of repopulation kinetics: Myeloid-biased (My-bi), Balanced or Lymphoid-biased (Ly-bi). Thus, an unexpected organization of HSC differentiation behaviors was discovered, leading to the principle of lineage bias established by Muller-Sieburg in collaboration with Hans Sieburg.

==== Deterministic regulation of hematopoiesis ====
Most theories of hematopoiesis assume that self-renewal and differentiation of hematopoietic stem cells (HSCs) are randomly regulated by intrinsic and environmental influences. Opposite to this "stochastic" view, Muller-Sieburg showed that random regulation is incompatible with the evidence of clonal hematopoiesis involving the heterogeneous core populations of HSCs. Specifically, her data argue that self-renewal does not contribute to the heterogeneity of the adult HSC compartment but, rather, all HSCs in a clone follow a predetermined fate, consistent with the generation-age hypothesis. By extension, the self-renewal and differentiation behavior of HSCs in adult bone marrow is more predetermined than stochastic. Almost a decade later, in a review paper, Timm Schroeder summarized these essential findings in the succinct phrase "subtypes, not unpredictable behavior". The dependence on epigenetically determined initial conditions placed hematopoiesis mathematically into the category of chaotic systems with deterministic evolution. This view was supported by Muller-Sieburg's finding in collaboration with H. Sieburg that the clonal lifespan of HSCs can be predicted from repopulation kinetics. Muller-Sieburg's experimental work, therefore, establishes hematopoiesis as a new highly non-trivial challenge in chaos theory.

=== A new theory of hematopoietic aging ===
Muller-Sieburg expanded her clonal studies to explore the correspondence between the long-term limit behavior of the hematopoietic process and the longevity of the host organism. Specifically, she wondered about the possible dualism of "aged organism" and "old HSCs". Following her own, strict biological definition of HSC aging as intrinsic to the hematopoietic system, she showed that the answer to the dualism problem lies in the long-term dynamics of clonal aging of individual HSCs in the context of the clonal composition of an aging hematopoietic system.

The clonal analysis of repopulating HSCs demonstrated that lymphoid-biased (Ly-bi) HSCs are lost earlier compared to the longer-lived myeloid-biased HSCs, which accumulate in the aged organism. Importantly, myeloid-biased (My-bi) HSCs from young and aged sources behave similarly in all aspects tested, indicating that organism aging does not change individual HSCs. Rather, aging (defined as "the totality of observable effects in an entity surviving in the long-term time limit relative to the behavior of the same observables at earlier times") changes the clonal composition of the HSC population, as manifested in the shift in bias classes of HSCs. Specifically, the proportion of the myeloid-biased HSCs is increased compared to the proportion of lymphoid-biased HSCs, while the proportion of balanced HSCs is near unchanged. This important conclusion may have significant implications to understanding the causes of the age-related immune deficiencies.

=== Computational research of hematopoiesis ===
Muller-Sieburg was an early adopter and promoter of the use of abstract mathematics in the field of experimental hematology. In collaboration with Hans Sieburg, this approach proved particularly fruitful in her experimental studies of HSC clonality. For example, the classification of kinetics or the prediction of lifespans from short initial kinetics or the reliability of self-renewal required symbolic computation, reliability theory and functional programming. Muller-Sieburg generously provided data for other modeling studies and engaged in correspondence discussions of deep principles of modeling hematopoiesis. The important outcomes of Muller-Sieburg's clonal diversity experiments are time-series, which are invaluable in computational research addressing one of the central open problems in hematopoiesis research, namely HSC "fate decisions". In vivo, at multiple million cell scales, "fate decisions" must occur reasonably fast and reliably to uphold all blood functions for extended periods of time. Muller-Sieburg's work showed that hematopoietic "decisions" occur on a largely deterministic basis, which is consistent with the demands for speed and reliability expected for host survival.
