= CFU-GM =

Cell type

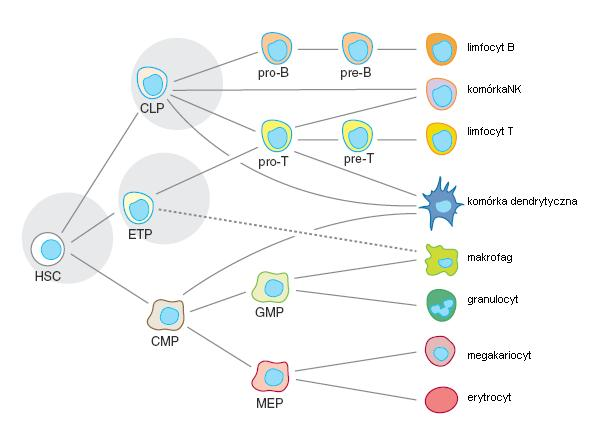
- Lineage. Captions in Polish, but "GMP" visible near bottom center.

Details
- Gives rise to: Monoblasts and myeloblasts
- Location: Bone marrow
- Function: colony forming unit

Identifiers
- MeSH: D055014
- TH: H2.00.04.3.02009

CFU-GM (Colony Forming Unit-Granulocyte/Macrophage (Note: The "GM" can also stand for "Granulocyte/Monocyte".)), also known as Granulocyte-Monocyte Progenitor (GMP), is a colony forming unit. It is derived from CFU-GEMM. It is the precursor for monoblasts and myeloblasts. Production is stimulated by granulocyte macrophage colony-stimulating factor (GM-CSF).

== Granulocytes ==
There is some controversy over which granulocytes derive from CFU-GM.

- There is little disagreement that neutrophils come from CFU-GM.
- Some sources state that basophils also derive from CFU-GM, but that eosinophils come from "CFU-Eos".
- Other sources state that basophils do not derive from CFU-GM, but from a distinct CFU, titled "CFU-Baso".

== See also ==
- Hematopoietic stem cell § Nomenclature of hematopoietic colonies and lineages
