= Extramedullary hematopoiesis =

Blood production outside of the bone marrow

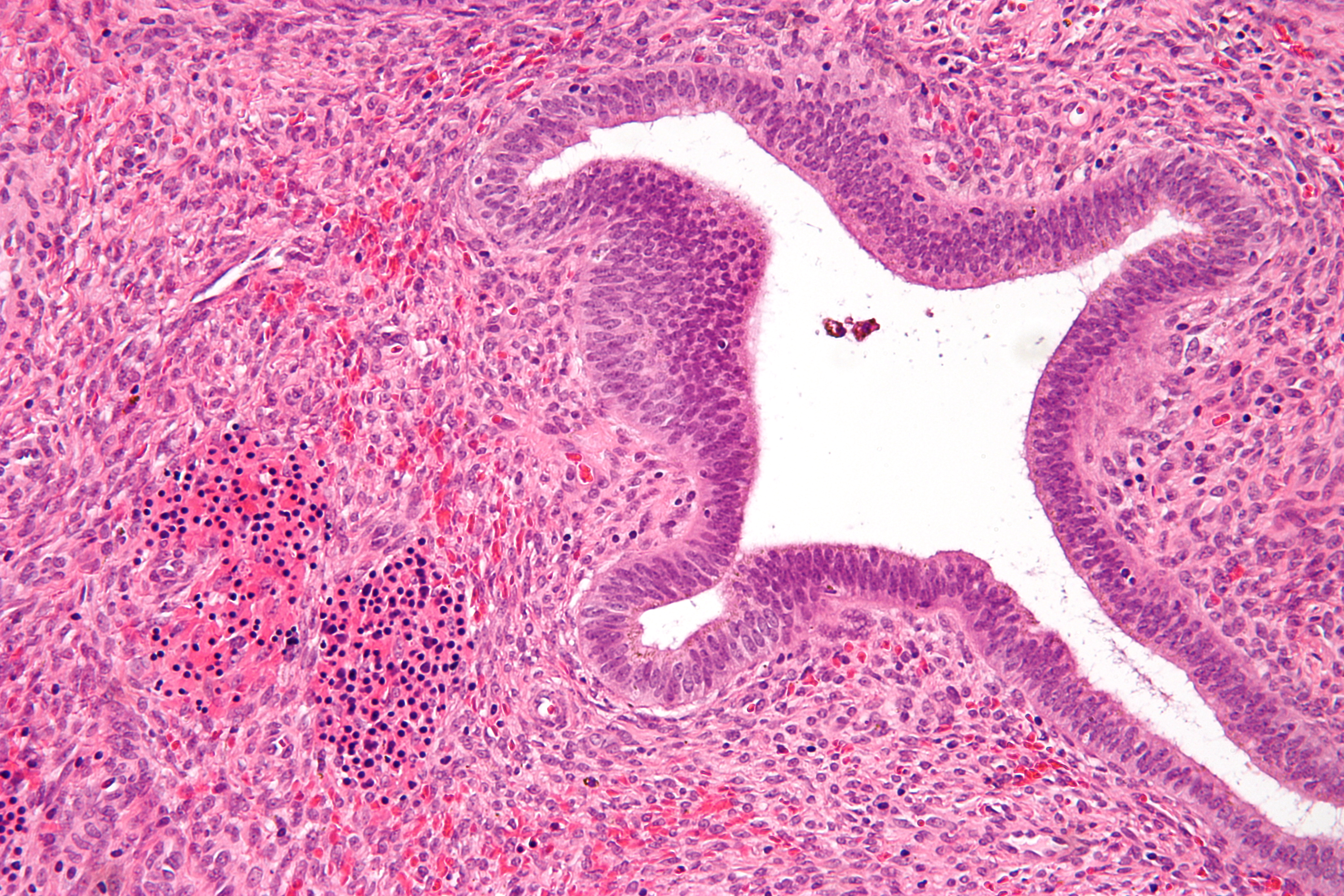
Micrograph showing nucleated red blood cells (bottom left of image), one of the elements necessary to call extramedullary hematopoiesis, in an endometrial polyp. H&E stain.

Extramedullary hematopoiesis (US English (Note: see spelling differences between US and Commonwealth English)) or extramedullary haematopoiesis (EMH or sometimes EH) refers to hematopoiesis occurring outside of the medulla of the bone (bone marrow). It can be physiologic or pathologic.

Physiologic EMH occurs during embryonic and fetal development; during this time the main sites of fetal hematopoiesis are the liver and spleen.

Pathologic EMH can occur during adulthood when physiologic hematopoiesis cannot work properly in the bone marrow and the hematopoietic stem cells (HSC) have to migrate to other tissues in order to continue with the formation of blood cellular components. Pathologic EMH can be caused by myelofibrosis, thalassemias or disorders caused in the hematopoietic system.

== Physiologic EMH ==
During fetal development, hematopoiesis occurs mainly in the fetal liver and in the spleen followed by localization to the bone marrow. Hematopoiesis also takes place in many other tissues or organs such as the yolk sac, the aorta-gonad mesonephros (AGM) region, and lymph nodes. During development, vertebrates go through a primitive and a definitive phase of hematopoiesis. The lungs also play a role in platelet production in adults.

=== Primitive hematopoiesis ===
Primitive hematopoiesis occurs in the yolk sac during early embryonic development. It is characterized by the production of primitive nucleated erythroid cells, which is thought to originate from endothelial cells or hemangioblasts, which are capable of forming both endothelium and primitive blood cells. The main objective of the production of these cells will be the facilitation of tissue oxygenation to support rapid embryonic growth. This primitive phase is transitory, and the cells that are produced express embryonic hemoglobins (HBZ and HBE1 genes produce the alpha and beta chains, respectively), are not pluripotent, and are not capable of self-renewal.

=== Definitive hematopoiesis ===
Definitive hematopoiesis differs from the primitive phase through the production of hematopoietic stem cells. The formation of these cells occurs in the AGM (aorta-gonad-mesonephros) later in development. This occurs by conversion of endothelial cells to hematopoietic stem and progenitor cells (HPSCs) - a process called endothelial-to-hematopoietic transition or EHT. These hematopoietic stem cells are further closely associated with endothelial cells throughout human life. Later, they migrate to the fetal liver where the majority of physiologic EMH (extra-medullary hematopoiesis) takes place. They can also migrate to the spleen and lymph nodes where hematopoiesis can occur, but to a lesser degree. Finally, once the bone marrow has developed, they migrate there.

=== Pulmonary hematopoiesis ===
Pulmonary hematopoiesis also appears to play an important role in adults. In comparison to the bone marrow, where trilineage hematopoiesis occurs, the lungs preferentially contribute to the production of platelets through a resident population of megakaryocytes. This is supported by studies showing that blood leaving the lungs has more platelets and fewer progenitor cells than blood entering the lungs. It has been seen that in cases of severe thrombocytopenia, pulmonary megakaryocytes migrate out of lungs into the bone marrow, where they help to replenish the depleted bone marrow population.

== Pathologic EMH ==
In adults, the majority of hematopoiesis occurs in the bone marrow. Significant production in any other organ is usually the result of a pathological process. When red blood cell (RBC) numbers are low, the body induces a homeostatic mechanism aimed to increase the synthesis of RBCs, typically via the production of erythropoietin. If the loss of RBCs becomes severe, hematopoiesis will occur in the extramedullary spaces outside the bone.

The cause of pathologic EMH can be one of many hematological diseases, such as myelofibrosis, or as a result of bone marrow irradiation. Thalassemia and its resultant hemolytic anemia is another important cause of pathologic EMH. EMH has been observed in numerous other benign hematological disorders such as sickle cell anemia, hereditary spherocytosis, congenital dyserythroblastic anemia and idiopathic thrombocytopenic purpura. EMH can also be seen as part of the response to systemic inflammation or infection.

=== Sites of EMH ===
Sites of EMH can be widespread however, most common localizations are in the spleen, liver, and lymph nodes. Other manifestations occur in the thymus, heart, breast, prostate, broad ligaments, kidneys, adrenal glands, pleura, retroperitoneal tissue, skin, peripheral and cranial nerves, and the spinal canal.

==== Spleen ====
During the postnatal period, the spleen becomes a frequent site of EMH whereas, during the embryonic stages of hematopoiesis, it is only a minor factor. Despite the hypoxic/acidic conditions of the splenic microenvironment, supplied with a legion of macrophages making it inhospitable for HSCs, EMH usually occurs within the red pulp. Among the various organs associated with EMH, the spleen offers a unique site for evaluation of hematopoietic stem cell (HSC)/niche interactions.

==== Liver ====
It is normal for infants have hepatic EMH as they are developing up until roughly 5 weeks of age. On the other hand, hepatic EMH in adults can indicate a pathological state. This includes transplantation, hepatic tumors, hepatic disorders, or sepsis. Hepatoblastoma, adenomas and hepatocellular carcinomas can also lead to EMH in adults. Additionally, EMH is often observed within the hepatic sinusoids.

==== Lymph nodes ====
EMH in the lymph nodes is usually associated with underlying hematopoietic neoplasms. Myeloproliferative neoplasms (MPNs) tend to result in EMH. If EMH is identified in the lymph nodes of an adult or infant, a hematologic evaluation, including blood cell counts, peripheral blood smear and potentially a bone marrow biopsy should be performed.

==== Other sites ====
The following tissues may also be associated with EMH: thymus, heart, breast, prostate, fatty tissue, adrenal glands, kidney, periosteum, pleural cavity, para-vertebral regions, intra-spinal tissue, retroperitoneal tissue, skin, peripheral and cranial nerves, the spinal canal, pre-sacral region, nasopharyngeal region, para-nasal sinuses and numerous types of benign/malignant neoplasms. The most common sites of EMH associated with neoplastic disorder are the spleen, lymph nodes, skin, bone, small intestine, orbit, breast, cervix, nasal sinus, mediastinum and brain.

== Microenvironment of EMH ==
Of the various organs associated with EMH, the spleen offers a unique site for evaluating HSC/niche interactions as it is one of the most common sites of EMH, however it does not play a major role in embryonic/developmental hematopoiesis. High expression levels of CXCL12 were found in the human spleens of EMH-positive patients compared to those who were EMH-negative. The high expression of CXCL12, a candidate marker of bone marrow niche-constituting in cells, indicates HSC/niche interactions in the spleen. Studies have shown that CXCL12 localizes in the sinus endothelial cells of the red pulp in EMH-positive spleens; whereas, CXCL12 was expressed throughout the vascular endothelial cells of the white pulp in spleens of EMH-negative and -positive cases. The fact that EMH frequently occurs in the red pulp, is supported by current data that suggests that splenic sinus endothelial cells expressing CXCL12 may contribute to the attachment and recruitment of circulating hematopoietic precursor cells, forming bone marrow niche-like regions of EMH in the human spleen.
