= Bassi, Bhulath =

Bassi
- Village
- Location in Punjab, India Bassi (India)
- Coordinates: 31.371480°N 75.393681°E
- Country: India
- State: Punjab
- District: Kapurthala

Government
  - Type: Panchayati raj (India)
  - Body: Gram panchayat

Population (2011)
  - Total: 1,952
- Sex ratio 978/974♂/♀

Languages
  - Official: Punjabi
  - Other spoken: Hindi
- Time zone: UTC+5:30 (IST)
- PIN: 144636
- Telephone code: 01822
- ISO 3166 code: IN-PB
- Vehicle registration: PB-09
- Website: kapurthala.gov.in

Bassi is a village in Bhulath tehsil, Kapurthala district, Punjab state, India. It is located 10 kilometres (6.2 mi) from Bhulath and 34 kilometres (21 mi) from the district headquarters at Kapurthala. The village is administrated by a Sarpanch who is an elected representative of village.

== List of cities near the village ==
- Bhulath
- Kapurthala
- Phagwara
- Sultanpur Lodhi

== Air travel connectivity ==
The closest International airport to the village is Sri Guru Ram Dass Jee International Airport.
