= Thymic nurse cell =

Thymic nurse cells (TNCs) are large epithelial cells found in the cortex of the thymus and also in cortico-medullary junction. They have their own nucleus and are known to internalize thymocytes through extensions of plasma membrane. The cell surfaces of TNCs and their cytoplasmic vacuoles express MHC Class I and MHC Class II antigens. The interaction of these antigens with the developing thymocytes determines whether the thymocytes undergo positive or negative selection.

== Structure and function ==
Thymic nurse cells (TNCs) are a sub-population of cortical thymic epithelial cells (cTECs). pH91, a TNC-specific monoclonal antibody, can be used to identify TNCs. Thymic nurse cells express both MHC Class I and II antigens, and are found in the cortico-medullary junction in addition to the cortex of the thymus.

The thymic nurse cells in the cortico-medullary junction express cytokeratin 5 (K5) and cytokeratin 8 (K8), whereas the ones in the cortex express only cytokeratin 8. Thymic nurse cells expressing only cytokeratin 5 have not been identified so far. Hendrix et al. found in their study that one-fourth of the nurse cells isolated from mice were double-positives for K5 and K8, while the rest of them were positive only for K8.

The extensions of plasma membrane from thymic nurse cells form a cage-like structure, which traps (Hendrix et al., 2010) triple positive T cells, αβTCR^{low}CD4^{+}CD8^{+} within the spaces formed by the interlocking of the membrane. Some of these T cells retain their mobility and undergo maturation to the developmental stage of αβTCR^{high}CD69^{+}; they are then released from the TNC complex. The enclosed thymocytes have been found to remain intact and retain both metabolic and mitotic activities despite lacking any contact with the extracellular environment.

Although initially thought to be involved only in positive selection, thymic nurse cells have now been discovered to facilitate negative selection of thymocytes as well. Negative selection refers to the degradation of thymocytes, and has been found to occur through the help of lysosomes. Lysosomes are present near the nucleus in the cytoplasm of TNCs. If the internalized thymocytes are selected for negative selection, vacuoles containing the thymocytes move closer to the area with lysosomes and eventually fuse with the lysosomes. This leads to the degradation of the T cells within the vacuoles. Macrophages have also been found actively moving in and out of the vacuoles inside the TNCs during the times of high apoptotic activity suggesting their involvement in the elimination of negatively selected T lymphocytes.

MHC restriction within TNCs

Whether the thymocytes undergo positive or negative selection is determined through MHC restriction, which refers to the interaction between the αβTCR (αβ T cell receptor) of the T cells and MHC antigens on the antigen-presenting cells.

This role of MHC restriction was observed in a study conducted by Martinez et al. in HY-TCR transgenic mice. Since HY is a male specific antigen, the developing thymocytes would be expected to undergo degradation in males but not in females. However, both males and females were found to contain TNCs. Furthermore, female mice TNCs were found to contain five times more thymocytes than male mice, and less than 4% of them were apoptotic compared to almost 50% in the male TNCs. Also, almost 90% of all thymocytes extracted from the female TNCs were found to be double positives (CD4^{+}CD8^{+}), whereas no such phenotype was present within the male thymic nurse cells. Thus, since not all thymocytes internalized by TNCs went through apoptotic pathways, this was used to conclude that thymic nurse cells are involved in MHC restriction process.

Negative selection has been proposed to occur when the αβTCR in developing T cells interact with MHC present on antigen-presenting cells like dendritic cells and macrophages with strong affinities, which then leads T cells down the apoptotic pathway inside the TNCs. Similarly, extremely weak affinities lead to the death of T lymphocytes through neglect. Only intermediate affinity interaction between the αβTCR of the T cells and MHC antigens in the TNCs results in positive selection.

Thymocytes uptake

The thymic cortical cells take up early thymocytes migrating from the bone marrow to the thymus and form the thymocyte-TNC complexes. The formation of finger-like projections has been found to facilitate this uptake; which also requires the participation of membrane and cytoskeleton proteins of TECs and thymocytes. Other players that mediate this process are ICAM-1, which is a cell adhesion molecule found on the surface of vacuoles and TNCs, and other extracellular glycoproteins like fibronectin, laminin and type IV collagen, which are produced by TNCs.

Similarly, the cytoplasmic vacuoles present in the cytoplasm near the membrane network also facilitate the uptake of thymocytes that have been negatively selected to undergo apoptosis.

The molecules like gal-3 (Galectin-3) and gal-1(Galectin-1), on the other hand, produce antagonistic effects. They inhibit thymocytes/TEC interaction and affect the movement of thymocytes in and out of TNC, in particular by increasing thymocyte release from TNCs.

Thymocytes within TNC

Incubation of TNC at 37 °C in tissue culture releases thymocytes (TNC-T) present within it. Incubation of TNC at 4 °C or room temperature inhibits release of TNC-T. Incubation of TNC at 37 °C in presence of 0.1% sodium azide prevents the release of TNC-T from within even though the TNC-T are viable. This suggests that metabolic activity of epithelial thymocyte complex is essential for the release of TNC-T.

TNC-T are functionally mature than those external to TNC (ET). Unlike ET, mouse TNC-T cells proliferate following stimulation with alloantigen, mitogen and help B cell make antibody when tested in tissue culture experiments. Chicken TNC-T cells exhibit greater graft vs host reactivity than peripheral blood T cells or ET cells when TNCs from one strain of chicken were placed on egg choriallantoic membrane of another strain of chicken with different MHC antigen. Based on the observation that TNC harbor functionally mature population of TNC-T and the electronmicroscopic studies suggesting that TNCs are localized in close proximity of blood capillaries in both cortex and cortico-medullary region of thymus, Vakharia & Mitchison have hypothesized that TNC-T are potential thymus emigrant cells.
