= Baso (village) =

Village in Indonesia

Coordinates: 0°17′S 100°27′E

Baso is a village in Agam Regency, West Sumatra, Indonesia. It is part of the nagari (settlement) of Tabek Panjang, in the kecamatan (sub-district) of Baso, located between the cities of Bukittinggi (15 km) and Payakumbuh.

== History ==
Baso was the transit and junction town of Payakumbuh, Bukittinggi and Batusangkar. It was known also as the most important farmers' trading and crops collection point in West Sumatra. The Dutch built railway stations, markets, and other supporting facilities like post offices and banks, as well as one of the biggest teacher training schools in West Sumatra, run by PGRI, the National Teachers' Association of Indonesia.

In the early 1970s, as automobiles replaced steam train and horse wagon transport in Sumatra, Baso slowly lost its strategic position as a transit point.

In recent years, Baso has developed as a ribbon town with small shops and local community services. The famous Baso farmers' market is now only left as history. In the early 1990s, most of its heritage, such as the old train station, old market, and Dutch buildings, were replaced by semi-modern buildings.
