= Bassi =

Bassi may refer to:

== People ==
- Bassi Maestro (born 1973) (also known simply as Bassi), Italian rapper, deejay, beatmaker
- Bassi (surname)

== Places ==
- Bassi Falls, a waterfall in the Sierra Nevada in California
- Bassi Department, a department or commune of Burkina Faso
- Bassi, India, a town in Rajasthan, India
  - Bassi (Rajasthan Assembly constituency)
  - Bassi (sanctuary), a wildlife sanctuary in Rajasthan, India
- Bassi, Bhulath, India, a village in Bhulath tehsil, Kapurthala district, Punjab state, India
