= San Basso =

List page of Wikipedia

Church of San Basso
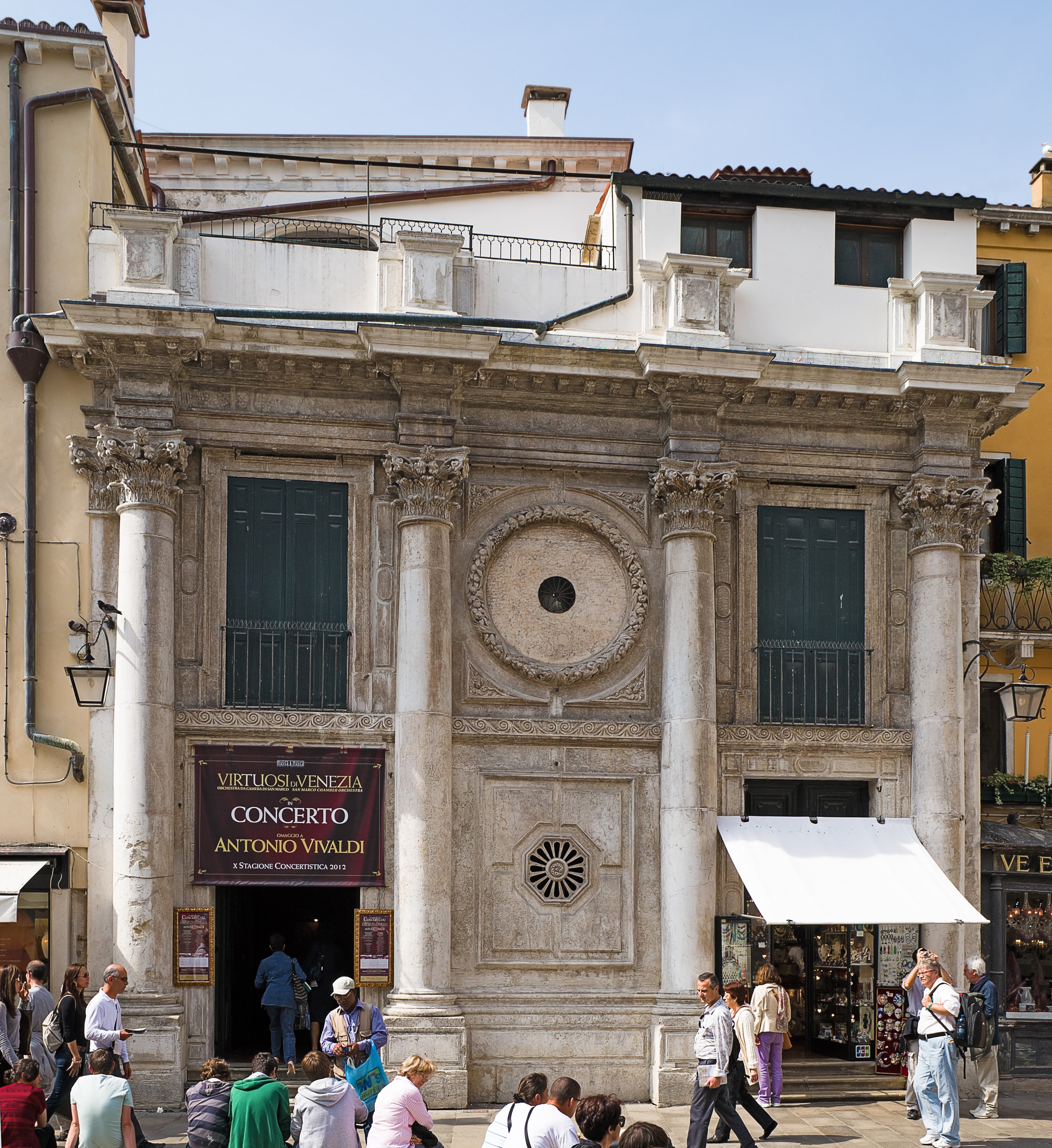

- Location within Venice Location within Italy

Religion
- Affiliation: Roman Catholic
- Province: Venice

Location
- Location: Venice, Italy
- Coordinates: 45°26′06″N 12°20′22″E

Architecture
- Architect: Baldassarre Longhena
- Type: Church
- Style: Baroque
- Completed: 1661

San Basso is a Baroque style deconsecrated Roman Catholic church in central Venice, Italy; it now serves as a concert hall.

According to the Venetian historian Flaminio Corner, the church was erected in the year 1079. It was rebuilt after fires in 1105, and again in 1661, the latter to a design by Baldassarre Longhena. Located nearby the St. Mark's Clocktower, it has a side façade on the Piazza San Marco. It has four Corinthian columns and two single mullioned windows.

In 1806, during the Napoleonic occupation, the church was closed and sold to a private source. In 1847, it was ceded to the Basilica di San Marco, which used it to store marbles and sculptures until, in the 1890s, it was restored as a meeting and concert hall.
