= Baso Sangqu =

South African diplomat

Baso Sangqu (born 21 April 1968, in Idutywa, Eastern Cape) was the South African Ambassador to the Kingdom of Belgium, the Grand Duchy of Luxembourg and the Mission to the European Union until March 2019. Previously he was permanent representative to the United Nations from 17 March 2009 onwards, having first served as deputy.

Sangqu was a member of the International Criminal Court search committee to find a replacement for Luis Moreno-Ocampo.

In January 2012, Sangqu was the President of the United Nations Security Council.

== Previous roles ==
- 1996–1998, Chief Education Specialist in the National Department of Education
- 2000, policy analyst and research consultant, Economic and Development Section of the Office of the President
- 2000, Director for Social and Economic Programmes, African Multilateral Development and Cooperation, Department of Foreign Affairs
- 2001, acting Chief Director for Marine, Environment, Science and Technology, Multilateral Development and Cooperation
- 2001–2002, acting Chief Director for Economic Development, Multilateral Development and Cooperation in the South African Department of Foreign Affairs
- 2002–2006, South Africa's ambassador to the African Union in Addis Ababa, Ethiopia
- 2007–2009, deputy permanent representative to the United Nations

== Education ==
- Bachelor's degree in commerce (economics and commercial law) from the University of Transkei
- Master's degree in development economics from Vanderbilt University in Nashville, Tennessee

Diplomatic posts
Preceded by Dumisani Kumalo	South African Ambassador to the United Nations; 17 March 2009 -	Incumbent
