= Malignant infantile osteopetrosis =

Human disease

- Other names: Infantile autosomal recessive osteopetrosis, Infantile osteopetrosis
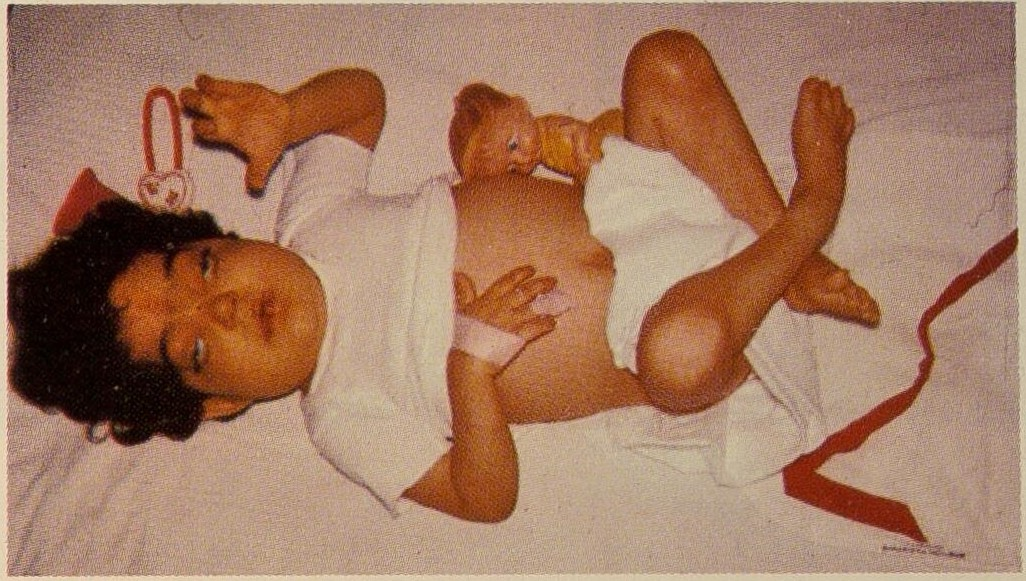
- Child with osteopetrosis

Malignant infantile osteopetrosis is a rare osteosclerosing type of skeletal dysplasia that typically presents in infancy and is characterized by a unique radiographic appearance of generalized hyperostosis (excessive growth of bone).

The generalized increase in bone density has a special predilection to involve the medullary portion with relative sparing of the cortices. Obliteration of bone marrow spaces and subsequent depression of the cellular function can result in serious hematologic complications. Optic atrophy and cranial nerve damage secondary to bony expansion can result in marked morbidity. The prognosis is extremely poor in untreated cases. Plain radiography provides the key information to the diagnosis. Clinical and radiologic correlations are also fundamental to the diagnostic process, with additional gene testing being confirmatory.

== Presentation ==
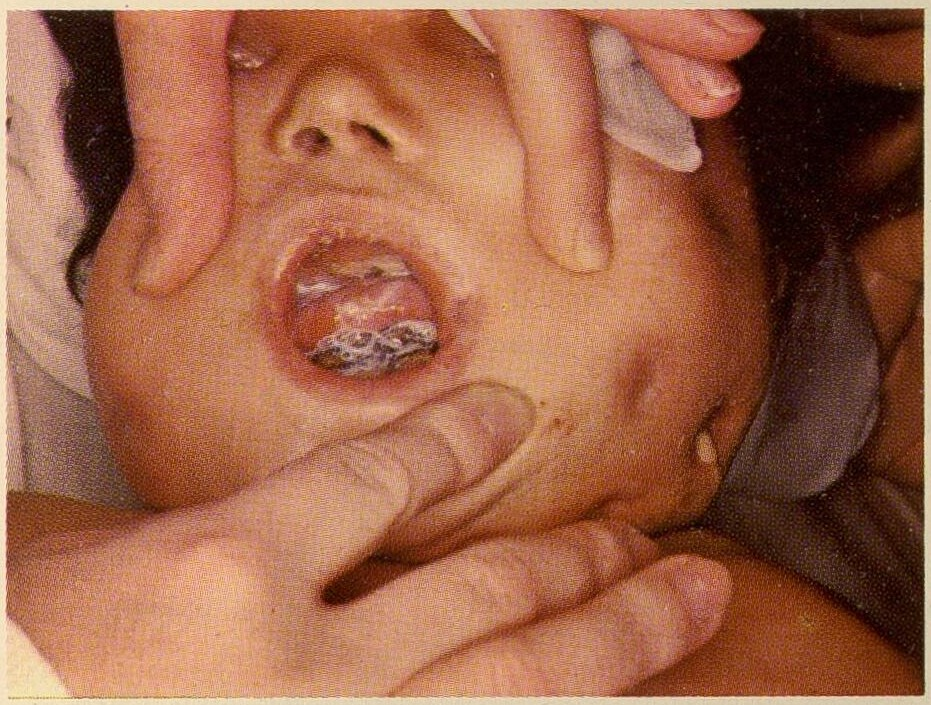
Poor dentition in osteopetrosis

Hematologic manifestations related to bone marrow suppression and subsequent pancytopenia are a major source of morbidity and mortality. Additionally, extramedullary hematopoiesis can result in liver and spleen dysfunction. Cranial nerve dysfunction and neurologic complications are usually associated with infantile osteopetrosis. Expansion of the skull bone leads to macrocephaly. Additionally, linear growth retardation that is not apparent at birth, delayed motor milestones and poor dentition can occur.

== Diagnosis ==
=== Skeletal radiography ===
The generalized increase in bone density of the medullary portion predominates with relative sparing of the cortices. The axial and appendicular skeleton are uniformly involved. Malignant infantile osteopetrosis is known for exhibiting specific plain radiographic abnormalities:

- Loss of differentiation between the medullary and cortical portions of bone is a radiographic hallmark of infantile osteopetrosis
- Characteristic endobone or "bone-within-bone" appearance in the spine, or "sandwich vertebra" appearance, characterized by dense endplate sclerosis with sharp margins
- Characteristic endobone or "bone-within-bone" appearance in the pelvis and long bones of extremities where areas of osteosclerosis intermingle with areas of relatively hypodense bone.
- Failure of remodeling of the distal femoral and proximal humeral metaphyses giving the affected bones a funnel shaped appearance known as an Erlenmeyer flask deformity
- Alternating radiolucent femoral metaphyseal bands
- Pathologic fractures

=== Differential diagnosis ===
The differential diagnosis of malignant infantile osteopetrosis includes other genetic skeletal dysplasias that cause osteosclerosis. They are collectively known as osteosclerosing dysplasias. The differential diagnosis of genetic osteosclerosing dysplasias including infantile osteopetrosis has been tabulated and illustrated in literature citations.

- Neuropathic infantile osteopetrosis
- Infantile osteopetrosis with renal tubular acidosis
- Infantile osteopetrosis with immunodeficiency
- IO with leukocyte adhesion deficiency syndrome (LAD-III)
- Intermediate osteopetrosis
- Autosomal dominant osteopetrosis (Albers-Schonberg)
- Pyknodysostosis (osteopetrosis acro-osteolytica)
- Osteopoikilosis (Buschke–Ollendorff syndrome)
- Osteopathia striata with cranial sclerosis
- Mixed sclerosing bone dysplasia
- Progressive diaphyseal dysplasia (Camurati–Engelmann disease)
- SOST-related sclerosing bone dysplasias

== Treatment ==
The only effective line of treatment for malignant infantile osteopetrosis is hematopoietic stem cell transplantation. It has been shown to provide long-term disease-free periods for a significant percentage of those treated. It can impact both hematologic and skeletal abnormalities; and has been used successfully to reverse the associated skeletal abnormalities.

Radiographs of at least one case with malignant infantile osteopetrosis have demonstrated bone remodeling and recanalization of medullar canals following hematopoietic stem cell transplantation. This favorable radiographic response could be expected within one year following the procedure – nevertheless, primary graft failure can prove fatal.
