= CFU-Baso =

Colony forming unit that gives rise to basophils

CFU-Baso is a colony forming unit that gives rise to basophils. Some sources use the term "CFU-Bas".
