= Basu Island =

Island in Riau, Indonesia

Pulau Basu Poelau Bakong
- Interactive map of Basu Island

Geography
- Location: South China Sea
- Coordinates: 0.3144°S 103.6056°E

Administration
- Indonesia
- Province: Riau
- Area covered: 409 km^{2} (158 sq mi)

Additional information
- Time zone: WIT (UTC+7)

Basu (also Bakung, Baso) is an island in Riau province close to the east coast of Sumatra island, Indonesia. Basu is part of the Kuala Indragiri district of the Indragiri Hilir Regency. Its area is 409 km^{2}.
