= Aorta-gonad-mesonephros =

The aorta-gonad-mesonephros (AGM) is a region of embryonic mesoderm that develops during embryonic development from the para-aortic splanchnopleura in chick, mouse and human embryos. The very first adult definitive haematopoietic stem cells, capable of long-term multilineage repopulation of adult irradiated recipients, originate from the ventral endothelial wall of the embryonic dorsal aorta, through an endothelial transdifferentiation process referred to as an 'endothelial-to-haematopoietic transition' (EHT). In the mouse embryo, these very first HSCs are characterised by their expression of Ly6A-GFP (Sca1), CD31, CD34, cKit, CD27, CD41, Gata2, Runx1, Notch1, and BMP amongst others.

The aorta-gonad-mesonephros (AGM) region is an area derived from splanchnopleura mesoderm identified in embryonic humans, mice, and non-mammalian vertebrates such as birds and zebrafish. It contains the dorsal aorta, genital ridges and mesonephros and lies between the notochord and the somatic mesoderm, extending from the umbilicus to the anterior limb bud of the embryo. The AGM region plays an important role in embryonic development, being the first autonomous intra-embryonic site for definitive haematopoiesis. Definitive haematopoiesis produces haematopoietic stem cells that have the capacity to 'self-renew' when serially transplanted into irradiated recipients, and differentiate into any of the blood cell lineages of the adult haematopoietic hierarchy. Specialised endothelial cells in the floor of the dorsal aorta (within the AGM region), identified as haemogenic endothelium, differentiate into haematopoietic stem cells.

== In embryonic development ==
The AGM region is derived from the mesoderm layer of the embryo. During organogenesis (around the fourth week in human embryos), the visceral region of the mesoderm, the splanchnopleura, transforms into distinct structures consisting of the dorsal aorta, genital ridges and mesonephros. For a period during embryonic development, the dorsal aorta produces hematopoietic stem cells, which will eventually colonise the liver and give rise to all mature blood lineages in the adult. By birth, the dorsal aorta becomes the descending aorta, while the genital ridges form the gonads. The mesonephros go on to form nephrons and other associated structures of the kidneys.

The formation of the AGM region has been best described in non-mammalian vertebrates such as Xenopus laevis. Shortly after gastrulation, cells from the dorsolateral plate, analogous to the splanchnopleura mesoderm in mammals, migrate to the midline, beneath the notochord to form the dorsal aorta, and laterally the cardinal veins and nephric ducts.

== Function ==
The most significant function of the aorta gonad mesonephros region is its role in definitive haematopoiesis. Definitive haematopoiesis is the second wave of embryonic haematopoiesis and give rise to all hematopoietic stem cells in the adult hematopoietic system. The aorta gonad mesonephros region has been shown to harbour multipotent hematopoietic colony-forming unit-spleen (CFU-S) progenitor cells and pluripotential long-term repopulating hematopoietic stem cells (LTR-HSCs). In contrast to the yolk sac, the extra-embryonic haematopoietic site, the number of CFU-S was much greater in the aorta gonad mesonephros region. LTR-HSC activity was also found in the aorta gonad mesonephros region at a slightly earlier time than in the yolk sac and fetal liver. Thus indicating the potency of definitive haematopoiesis from this region. Furthermore, isolated organ cultures of the AGM from mouse embryos can autonomously initiate hematopoietic stem cell activity, without influence from the yolk sac or liver. At 10 days post coitus (d.p.c.) the aorta gonad mesonephros region was able to initiate and expand definitive haematopoietic stem cell activity, whereas no haematopoietic activity was seen in the yolk sac until 11 d.p.c. This is the same in human embryos, where they are first detected at day 27 in the aorta gonad mesonephros region, expand rapidly at day 35, then disappear at day 40. This "disappearance" correlates to the migration of these hematopoietic stem cells to the foetal liver, where it becomes the subsequent site of haematopoiesis.

== Histology ==
The dorsal aorta consists of an endothelial layer and an underlying stromal layer. There is also another cell population called haematogenic endothelium, which derive from the endothelial layer to produce hematopoietic stem cells.

=== Endothelial cells ===
Endothelial cells line the lumen of all blood vessels as a single squamous endothelial layer. These cells maintain contact with each other through tight junctions. In the AGM, endothelial cells line the lumen of the dorsal aorta. A specialised subset of endothelial cells, haemogenic endothelium has the potential to differentiate into haematopoietic stem cells.

=== Haemogenic endothelium ===
Hematopoietic stem cells (HSC) were detected adhering firmly to the ventral endothelium of the dorsal aorta. These cells have been identified to originate from haematogenic endothelium, a precursor of both hematopoietic and endothelial lineages. This is where HSC differentiate from the endothelial lining of the dorsa aorta. VE-cadherin, a specific marker for endothelial cells is found on the luminal side of the aortic endothelium. Cells clustered on the wall of the dorsal aorta also expressed VE-cadherin as well as CD34, a common hematopoietic and endothelial marker; and CD45, a marker present on hematopoietic cells. When these special endothelial cells were cultured in vitro, they were able to generate haematopoietic stem cells at a higher rate than cells from a haematopoietic origin. Thus the co-expression of cell surface markers from both lineages suggests that hematopoietic stem cells differentiate from endothelial cells of the dorsal aorta in the AGM.

Time lapse imaging of live zebrafish embryos has provided the visualisation of haematogenic endothelium differentiating into hematopoietic stem cells. From about 30 hours post-fertilization, a few hours before the first appearance of dHSCs, many endothelial cells from the aortic floor start contracting and bending towards the subaortic space, usually lasting for 1–2 hours. Then these cells undergo a further contraction along the mediolateral axis, bringing together its two lateral endothelial neighbours and releasing its contact with them. The emerged cell assumes a rounded morphology and maintains strong contacts with the rostral and caudal endothelial cells to travel along the vessel's axis. Electron microscope images show that these cells maintain contacts through tight junctions. Once these contacts dissolve, the cell, due to its apical-base polarity, moves into the subaortic space and consequently colonises other hematopoietic organs.

== Haematopoietic stem cell development ==
In the AGM production of HSCs, it is believed that haemogenic endothelial cells play a key role. Haemogenic endothelial cells are specific endothelial cells that concurrently express both haematopoietic and endothelial markers. These haemogenic endothelial cells then become activated, releasing their binding with adjacent endothelial cells, and entering circulation in a process referred to as 'budding'. This occurs at E9.5 in the developing mouse embryo. From here the haemogenic endothelial cells develop into HSCs. However, the precise signalling pathway involved in haemogenic endothelial cell activation is unknown, but several signalling molecules have been implicated including nitric oxide (NO), Notch 1, and Runx1.

Signaling pathways involved in AGM haemogenic endothelial cell activation include:

=== Runx1 ===
RUNX1 (also known as AML1) is a transcription factor that has been heavily implicated in the production and activation of haemogenic endothelial cells in the AGM. RUNX1 knockout studies have shown a complete removal of definitive haematopoietic activity in all foetal tissues before embryo lethality at E12. RUNX1 knockouts also produce morphological changes in the AGM, with excessive crowding of mesenchymal cells. As mesenchymal cells differentiate into endothelial cells, the absence of RUNX1 may impact on the ability of mesenchymal cells to differentiate into haemogenic endothelial cells. This would explain the increase in mesenchymal cell number, and the distinct lack of cells positive for other haematopoietic markers. Runx1 has also been implicated in the activation of haemogenic endothelium. Using conditional knockouts it was shown that the removal of Runx1 expression in AGM haemogenic endothelial cells, prevented the production of HSCs. The same experiments also showed that once HSCs were produced, Runx1 was no longer required producing no deviation in HSC activity compared to controls. Additionally, when AGM cells from Runx1 knockouts underwent retroviral transfer in vitro to overexpress Runx1, they were able to be rescued and produce definitive haematopoietic cells. This suggests that Runx1 plays a critical role in the signalling pathway for haemogenic cell activation and its production from mesenchymal cells.

=== Nitric oxide ===
Nitric oxide signalling has also been shown to play a role in haemogenic endothelial cell production and activation, possibly by regulating the expression of Runx1. The sheer stress from blood flow activates mechanoreceptors in the blood vessel to produce NO, making NO production circulation dependent. This is seen in Ncx1 knockouts, where the failure to develop a heartbeat, and consequent lack of circulation results in a down-regulation of Runx1 and no haematopoietic activity in the AGM. When Ncx1 knockouts are supplied with an external source of NO, haematopoietic activity in the AGM returns to near wild-type levels. This isolates NO signalling as the key factor controlling haematopoiesis, and not just the presence of circulation. However the signalling cascade linking NO to Runx1 expression is yet to be elucidated. NO signalling has also been shown to control the motility of endothelial cells by regulating the expression of cell adhesion molecules ICAM-1. This makes it likely that it is involved in the budding of haemogenic endothelial cells into circulation. As Runx1 is also crucial for haemogenic endothelial cell activation, it is possible that NO regulates both of these downstream effects.

=== Notch signaling ===
Notch1 is another protein which has been implicated in the signalling pathway for HSC production. Notch1 knockouts exhibit normal haematopoiesis in the yolk sac, but fail to produce any HSCs in the AGM. Experiments have been shown that decreased Notch1 expression also affects the expression of Runx1, resulting in its downregulation. Further experiments in which Notch1 is overexpressed shows large clusters of definitive haematopoietic cells developing in the endothelium of the AGM. As Runx1 expression is proportional to haematopoietic cell production, these results suggest that Notch1 is also involved in regulating Runx1.
