= Basso (surname) =

Basso is an Italian surname. Notable people with the surname include:

- Adriano Basso (born 1975), Brazilian footballer
- Aina Basso (born 1979), Norwegian historian and novelist
- Annalise Basso (born 1998), American actress
- Anthony Basso (1979–2025), French footballer
- Brady Basso (born 1997), American baseball player
- Claudio Basso (born 1977), Argentine singer
- Dominick Basso (1938–2001), American mobster from
- Flávio Basso (1968–2015), Brazilian musician
- Gabriel Basso (born 1994), American actor
- Giandomenico Basso (born 1973), Italian rally driver
- Girolamo Basso della Rovere (1434–1507), Italian Catholic cardinal
- Guido Basso (1937–2023), Canadian jazz musician from Montreal
- Hamilton Basso (1904–1964), American novelist
- Ivan Basso (born 1977), Italian cyclist
- Jorge Basso (born 1956), Uruguayan physician and politician
- Josias Basso (born 1989), Brazilian footballer
- Keith H. Basso (1940–2013), American anthropologist
- Lelio Basso (1903–1978), Italian politician and journalist
- Leonardo Basso (born 1993), Italian cyclist
- Luke Basso (born 2003), American football player
- Marino Basso (born 1945), Italian cyclist
- Oscar Basso (1922–2007), Argentine football player
- Romina Basso, Italian mezzo-soprano
- Sammy Basso (1995–2024), Italian biologist
- Sonia Basso (born 1954), Italian cross-country skier
- Stephen Basso (born 1987), Costa Rican-born American soccer player
- Suzanne Basso (1954–2014), American murderer
- basso, pseudonym of Natsume Ono (born 1977), Japanese manga artist
